= National Executive Council =

Executive branch of Papua New Guinea

- Emblem of Papua New Guinea

Council overview
- Formed: 1975
- Jurisdiction: Government of Papua New Guinea
- Headquarters: Sir Manasupe Haus, Port Moresby, Papua New Guinea
- Council executives: James Marape, Prime Minister of Papua New Guinea/Chairman; John Rosso, Deputy Prime Minister; Grace So'on, Secretary of the NEC
- Key documents: Constitution of Papua New Guinea; Prime Minister and National Executive Council Act 2002

The National Executive Council (NEC), also known as the Cabinet of Papua New Guinea functions as the decision-making body (on policies and legislation) of the executive branch within the government system of Papua New Guinea. The Prime Minister and Ministers serve as members of the Cabinet.

== NEC Office ==
Since April 2025, the Department of the Prime Minister and the Office of the Secretary of the National Executive Council have become two separate entities. Currently, the NEC Office is housed in a new building opposite Parliament on Independence Drive named "Melanesia Haus", after having been located at Sir Manasupe Haus.

== Functions ==
All executive power in the government is vested in the National Executive Council, which comprises all Ministers of the Crown. Unlike Australia, whose has a two-tier level of government between the Cabinet for political decision and the Federal Executive Council for purely formal decisions, the NEC is patterned along the precedent of the former as it makes policy decisions. The total number of Ministers comprising the National Executive Council is never to be less than a quarter of the National Parliament.

The Secretary to the National Executive Council is in charge of the NEC Secretariat.

== Current Cabinet ==
James Marape formed a new cabinet on 23 August 2022 after the 2022 Papua New Guinean general election. Six new members of the cabinet were added in a cabinet reshuffle on 18 January 2024.

Portfolio	Minister	Minister's party	Took office	Left office
Prime Minister; Treasurer	James Marape	Pangu Pati	23 August 2022	Incumbent
Deputy Prime Minister; Minister for Lands and Physical Planning	John Rosso	Pangu Pati	23 August 2022	Incumbent
Minister for Agriculture	Aiye Tambua	Pangu Pati	23 August 2022	18 January 2024
Minister for Agriculture	John Boito	Pangu Pati	18 January 2024	Incumbent
Minister Assisting the Prime Minister	Ian Ling-Stuckey	Pangu Pati	18 January 2024	Incumbent
Minister for Bougainville Affairs; Minister for the National Gaming Control Board	Manasseh Makiba	Pangu Pati	18 January 2024	Incumbent
Minister for Civil Aviation and Transport	Walter Schnaubelt	National Alliance Party	23 August 2022	Incumbent
Minister for Coffee	Joe Kuli	United Resources Party	23 August 2022	18 January 2024
Minister for Coffee	William Bando	United Resources Party	18 January 2024	Incumbent
Minister for Commerce and Industry	Henry Amuli	Pangu Pati	23 August 2022	18 January 2024
Minister for Commerce and Industry	Win Bakri Daki	Pangu Pati	18 January 2024	Incumbent
Minister for Community Development, Youth & Religion	Jason Peter	United Resources Party	23 August 2022	Incumbent
Minister for Correctional Services	Joe Kuli	United Resources Party	18 January 2024	Incumbent
Minister for Culture and Tourism	Isi Henry Leonard	Pangu Pati	23 August 2022	Incumbent
Minister for Defence	Win Daki	Pangu Pati	23 August 2022	18 January 2024
Minister for Defence	William "Billy" Joseph	Social Democratic Party	18 January 2024	Incumbent
Minister for Education	Jimmy Uguro	Pangu Pati	23 August 2022	Incumbent
Minister for Energy	Kerenga Kua	National Party	23 August 2022	Incumbent
Minister for Environmental Conservation and Climate Change	Simon Kilepa	United Resources Party	23 August 2022	Incumbent
Minister for Finance	Rainbo Paita	Pangu Pati	23 August 2022	Incumbent
Minister for Fisheries and Marine Resources	Jelta Wong	United Resources Party	23 August 2022	Incumbent
Minister for Foreign Affairs	Justin Tkatchenko	Pangu Pati	23 August 2022	Incumbent
Minister for Forests	Salio Waipo	Pangu Pati	23 August 2022	Incumbent
Minister for Health & HIV/AIDS	Dr. Lino Tom	People's Party	23 August 2022	Incumbent
Minister for Higher Education and Sports	Don Polye	Triumph Heritage Empowerment Party	23 August 2022	Incumbent
Minister for Housing and Urbanisation	Kobby Bomareo	Pangu Pati	23 August 2022	Incumbent
Minister for Information and Communications Technology	Timothy Masiu	Pangu Pati	23 August 2022	Incumbent
Minister for Inter-Government Relations	Soroi Eoe	Pangu Pati	23 August 2022	Incumbent
Minister for International Trade	Richard Maru	People's First Party	23 August 2022	Incumbent
Minister for Justice and Attorney General	Pila Niningi	Pangu Pati	23 August 2022	Incumbent
Minister for Key Constitutional Offices	Richard Masere	Greens Party	18 January 2024	Incumbent
Minister for Labour and Industrial Relations	Bryan Kramer	Allegiance Party	23 August 2022	18 January 2024
Minister for Labour and Industrial Relations	Kessy Sawang	People's First Party	18 January 2024	Incumbent
Minister for Livestock	Sekie Agisa	Pangu Pati	23 August 2022	Incumbent
Minister for Mining	Ano Pala	Pangu Pati	23 August 2022	18 January 2024
Minister for Mining	Muguwa Dilu	Advance PNG	18 January 2024	Incumbent
Minister for National Planning and Implementation	Ano Pala	Pangu Pati	18 January 2024	Incumbent
Minister for Oil Palm	Francis Maneke	Pangu Pati	23 August 2022	Incumbent
Minister for Petroleum	Kerenga Kua	National Party	23 August 2022	18 January 2024
Minister for Petroleum	Jimmy Maladina	Pangu Pati	18 January 2024	Incumbent
Minister for Police	Peter Tsiamalili Jr.	Pangu Pati	23 August 2022	Incumbent
Minister for Public Service	Joe Sungi	Pangu Pati	23 August 2022	Incumbent
Minister for State-Owned Enterprises	William Duma	United Resources Party	23 August 2022	Incumbent
Minister for Works and Highway Implementation	Solan Mirisim	Pangu Pati	23 August 2022	Incumbent

== Past Cabinets ==
=== First Marape cabinet ===
Prime Minister James Marape appointed his first cabinet on 7 June 2019.

Portfolio	Minister	Minister's party
Prime Minister	James Marape	Pangu Party
Deputy Prime Minister; Attorney-General; Minister for Justice	Davis Steven	Unaffiliated
Treasurer	Ian Ling-Stuckey	National Alliance Party
Minister for Foreign Affairs and Trade	Soroi Eoe	People's National Congress
Minister for Finance; Minister for Rural Development	Charles Abel	Our Development Party
Minister for Education	Joseph Yopyyopy	Melanesian Alliance Party
Minister for Civil Aviation	Lekwa Gure	Melanesian Alliance Party
Minister for Commerce; Minister for Industry	Wera Mori	Unaffiliated
Minister for Communication; Minister for Energy	Renbo Paita	Pangu Party
Minister for Community Development; Minister for Youth; Minister for Religion	Wake Goi	People's National Congress
Minister for Correctional Services	Chris Nangoi	Melanesian Alliance Party
Minister for Defence	Saki Soloma	Unaffiliated
Minister for Environment, Conservation and Climate Change	Jeffery Kama	Triumph Heritage Empowerment Party
Minister for Fisheries and Marine Resources	Dr Lino Tom	Pangu Party
Minister for Bougainville Affairs	Sir Puka Temu	Our Development Party
Minister for Health and HIV/AIDS	Elias Kapavore	People's National Congress
Minister for Higher Education; Minister for Research; Minister for Science and Technology	Nick Kuman	People's National Congress
Minister for Housing and Urban Development	Justin Tkatchenko	People's National Congress
Minister for Immigration and Border Security	Petrus Thomas	Independent
Minister for Inter-Government Relations	Pila Niningi	People's National Congress
Minister for Labour and Industrial Relations	Alfred Manase	People's National Congress
Minister for Agriculture and Livestock	John Simon	Unaffiliated
Minister for Lands and Physical Planning	John Rosso	Pangu Party
Minister for Petroleum	Kerenga Kua	PNG National Party
Minister for Police	Bryan Kramer	Allegiance Party
Minister for State Enterprises	Sasindran Muthuvel	People's National Congress
Minister for Public Service	Westly Nukundj	People's National Congress
Minister for Tourism, Arts and Culture	Emil Tammur	People's Progress Party
Minister for Transport and Infrastructure	William Samb	Pangu Party
Minister for Works and Implementation	Michael Nali	People's National Congress
Minister for Forestry	Solan Mirisim	People's National Congress
Minister for National Planning and Monitoring	Richard Maru	People's National Congress
Minister for Mining	Johnson Tuke	People's Progress Party

==== First reshuffle ====
James Marape announced a cabinet reshuffle on 1 October 2020.

Portfolio	Minister	Minister's party
Prime Minister; Minister for Bougainville Affairs	James Marape	Pangu Party
Deputy Prime Minister; Minister for National Planning and Monitoring	Sam Basil	United Labour Party
Minister for Justice; Attorney General	Davis Steven	People's Party
Treasurer	Ian Ling-Stuckey	National Alliance Party
Minister for Foreign Affairs and Trade	Patrick Pruaitch	National Alliance Party
Minister for Finance; Minister for Rural Development	Rainbo Paita	Pangu Party
Minister for Education	Joseph Yopyyopy	Melanesian Alliance Party
Minister for Civil Aviation	Jelta Wong	United Resources Party
Minister for Commerce and Industry	William Duma	United Resources Party
Minister for Communication and ICT	Timothy Masiu	National Alliance Party
Minister for Community Development; Minister for Youth; Minister for Religion	Wake Goi	People's Party
Minister for Correctional Services	Chris Nangoi	Melanesian Alliance Party
Minister for Defence	Saki Soloma	Pangu Party
Minister for Environment, Conservation and Climate Change	Wera Mori	Pangu Party
Minister for Fisheries and Marine Resources	Dr Lino Tom	Peoples Party
Minister for Health and HIV/AIDS	Sir Puka Temu	Our Development Party
Minister for Higher Education; Minister for Research; Minister for Science and Technology	Nick Kuman	Pangu Party
Minister for Housing and Urban Development	Justin Tkatchenko	Social Democratic Party
Minister for Immigration and Border Security	Westly Nukundj	Independent
Minister for Inter-Government Relations	Pila Niningi	People's National Congress
Minister for Labour and Industrial Relations	Lekwa Gure	United Labour Party
Minister for Agriculture and Livestock	John Simon	Pangu Party
Minister for Lands and Physical Planning	John Rosso	Pangu Party
Minister for Petroleum	Kerenga Kua	PNG National Party
Minister for Police	Bryan Kramer	Allegiance Party
Minister for State Enterprises	Sasindran Muthuvel	Pangu Party
Minister for Public Service	Soroi Eoe	Pangu Party
Minister for Tourism, Arts and Culture	Walter Schnaubelt	National Alliance
Minister for Transport and Infrastructure	William Samb	Pangu Party
Minister for Works and Implementation	Michael Nali	People's National Congress
Minister for Forestry	Solan Mirisim	Pangu Party
Minister for Energy	William Onglo	United Resource Party
Minister for Mining	Johnson Tuke	People's Progress Party

==== Second reshuffle ====
Prime Minister James Marape added nine new ministers to his cabinet on 20 December 2020.

Portfolio	Minister	Minister's party	Took office	Left office
Prime Minister; Minister for Bougainville Affairs	James Marape	Pangu Party	20 December 2020	23 August 2022
Deputy Prime Minister; Minister for Commerce and Industry	Sam Basil	United Labour Party	20 December 2020	23 August 2022
Minister for Justice	Bryan Jared Kramer	Allegiance Party	20 December 2020	23 August 2022
Minister for Treasury	Ian Ling-Stuckey	National Alliance Party	20 December 2020	23 August 2022
Minister for Foreign Affairs and Trade	Soroi Eoe	Pangu Party	20 December 2020	23 August 2022
Minister for Finance; Minister for Rural Development	Sir John Pundari	Liberal	20 December 2020	23 August 2022
Minister for Education	Jimmy Uguro	Pangu Party	20 December 2020	23 August 2022
Minister for Civil Aviation	Sekie Agisa	Pangu Party	20 December 2020	23 August 2022
Minister for Communication and ICT	Timothy Masiu	National Alliance Party	20 December 2020	23 August 2022
Minister for Community Development; Minister for Youth; Minister for Religion	Wake Goi	People's Party	20 December 2020	23 August 2022
Minister for Correctional Services	Win Daki	Pangu Party	20 December 2020	23 August 2022
Minister for Defence	Solan Mirisim	Pangu Party	20 December 2020	23 August 2022
Minister for Environment, Conservation and Climate Change	Wera Mori	Pangu Party	20 December 2020	23 August 2022
Minister for Fisheries and Marine Resources	Dr Lino Tom	People's Party	20 December 2020	23 August 2022
Minister for Health and HIV/AIDS	Jelta Wong	United Resources Party	20 December 2020	23 August 2022
Minister for Higher Education; Minister for Research; Minister for Science and Technology; Minister for Sports and National Gaming	Wesley Raminai		20 December 2020	23 August 2022
Minister for Housing and Urban Development	Justin Tkatchenko	Social Democratic Party	20 December 2020	23 August 2022
Minister for Immigration and Border Security	Westly Nukundj	Independent	20 December 2020	23 August 2022
Minister for Inter-Government Relations	Pila Niningi	People's National Congress	20 December 2020	23 August 2022
Minister for Labour and Employment	Tomait Kapili	United Resources Party	20 December 2020	23 August 2022
Minister for Agriculture and Livestock	John Simon	Pangu Party	20 December 2020	23 August 2022
Minister for Lands and Physical Planning	John Rosso	Pangu Party	20 December 2020	23 August 2022
Minister for Petroleum	Kerenga Kua	National Party	20 December 2020	23 August 2022
Minister for Police	William Onglo	United Resources Party	20 December 2020	23 August 2022
Minister for State Enterprises	William Duma	United Resources Party	20 December 2020	23 August 2022
Minister for Public Service	Joe Sungi	Pangu Party	20 December 2020	23 August 2022
Minister for Tourism, Arts and Culture	Isi Henry Leonard	National Party	20 December 2020	23 August 2022
Minister for Transport and Infrastructure	William Samb	Pangu Party		23 August 2022
Minister for Works and Implementation	Michael Nali	People's National Congress	20 December 2020	23 August 2022
Minister for Forestry	Walter Schnaubelt	National Alliance Party	20 December 2020	23 August 2022
Minister for Energy	Saki Soloma	Pangu Party	20 December 2020	23 August 2022
Minister for Mining	Johnson Tuke	People's Progress Party	20 December 2020	23 August 2022
Minister of Commerce and Industry	Henry Amuli	Melanesian Alliance Party	April 2022	23 August 2022

=== Marape Caretaker Cabinet ===
James Marape was elected as Prime Minister on 30 May 2019, and on 31 May he appointed a caretaker Cabinet.

Portfolio	Minister	Minister's party
Prime Minister; Minister for Public Service; Minister for Public Enterprises and State Investments	James Marape	Pangu Party
Minister for Foreign Affairs; Minister for Defence; Minister for Commerce and Industry; Minister for Civil Aviation; Minister for Fisheries and Forest	Solan Mirisim	People's National Congress
Minister for Finance; Minister for Petroleum and Energy; Minister for Inter-Government Relations; Minister for Community Development	Richard Maru	People's National Congress
Minister for National Planning; Minister for Health; Minister for Housing; Minister for Communication and Information Technology; Minister for Higher Education	Sam Basil	Melanesian Alliance Party
Minister for Mining; Minister for Transport; Minister for Culture and Tourism; Minister for Correctional Services; Minister for Environment, Conservation and Climate Change	Johnson Tuke	People's Progress Party
Attorney-General; Minister for Justice; Minister for Labour and Industrial Relations; Minister for Agriculture and Livestock; Minister for Lands and Physical Planning	Davis Steven	Unaffiliated
Minister for Works; Minister for Bougainville Affairs; Minister for Immigration and Border Security	Michael Nali	People's National Congress
Treasurer; Minister for Education; Minister for Police	Charles Abel	Our Development Party

=== O'Neill-Abel Cabinet ===
Following the re-election of Peter O'Neill's government at the 2017 election, O'Neill appointed his Cabinet on 9 August 2017.

Portfolio	Minister	Minister's party
Prime Minister; Minister for Sports; Minister for APEC	Peter O'Neill	People's National Congress
Deputy Prime Minister; Minister for Treasury	Charles Abel	People's National Congress
Minister for Inter-Governmental Relations	Kevin Isifu	People's Progress Party
Minister for Finance	James Marape	People's National Congress
Minister for Planning and Monitoring	Richard Maru	People's National Congress
Minister for Public Service	Elias Kapavore	People's National Congress
Minister for Petroleum and Energy	Fabian Pok	United Resources Party
Minister for Lands and Physical Planning	Justin Tkatchenko	People's National Congress
Minister for Foreign Affairs and Trade	Rimbink Pato	United Party
Minister for Housing and Urbanisation	John Kaupa	People's National Congress
Minister for Police	Jelta Wong	United Resources Party
Minister for Higher Education, Research, Science and Technology	Pila Ninigi	People's National Congress
Minister for Bougainville Affairs	Fr Simon Dumarinu	Social Democratic Party
Minister for Civil Aviation	Alfred Manasseh	People's National Congress
Minister for Defence	Solan Mirisim	People's National Congress
Minister for Works and Implementation	Michael Nali	Independent
Minister for Public Enterprise and State Investment	William Duma	United Resources Party
Minister for Commerce and Industry	Wera Mori	People's National Congress
Minister for Environment, Conservation and Climate CHange	John Pundari	People's National Congress
Minister for Agriculture and Livestock	Benny Allan	People's National Congress
Minister for Transport	Westly Nukundi	People's National Congress
Minister for Labour and Industrial Relations	Mehrra Kipefa	United Resources Party
Minister for Communication and Information Technology	Francis Maneke	Our Development Party
Minister for Religion, Youth and Community Development	Soroi Eoe	People's National Congress
Minister for Health and HIV/AIDS	Sir Puka Temu	People's National Congress
Minister for Education	Nick Kuman	People's National Congress
Minister for Fisheries	Patrick Basa	Christian Democratic Party
Minister for Correctional Services	Roy Biyama	People's National Congress
Minister for Culture and Tourism	Emil Tamur	People's Progress Party
Minister for Immigration and Border Security	Petrus Thomas	Independent
Minister for Justice; Attorney-General	Davis Steven	People's National Congress
Minister for Forestry	Douglas Tomuriesa	People's National Congress
Minister for Mining	Johnson Tuke	People's Progress Party

=== First O'Neill Cabinet ===
With Prime Minister Sir Michael Somare having been hospitalised for a serious heart condition, leadership of the nation was vested in Deputy Prime Minister Sam Abal in April 2011. In August, following a Cabinet reshuffle which had led three ministers to join the Opposition, the latter brought a successful motion of no confidence in Abal's government. Parliament chose Peter O'Neill to serve as Prime Minister.

On 27 February 2012, O'Neill removed the Finance portfolio from Don Polye, taking it on himself. He cited "the continuing lack of ability by the department and ministry of finance to contain expenditure overruns outside of the budget appropriations". Polye retained the Treasury portfolio, and gained that of Border Development. O'Neill hinted that the Finance ministry would eventually be returned to him, and also hinted at an imminent major Cabinet reshuffle.

On 9 August 2012, following a general election, O'Neill announced the following cabinet for the 2012–2017 term:

Portfolio	Minister	Minister's province	Minister's party	Parliamentary secretary	Opposition shadow minister
Prime Minister	Peter O'Neill	Southern Highlands Province	People's National Congress Party		
Deputy Prime Minister; Minister for Inter-Government Relations	Leo Dion	East New Britain Province	Triumph Heritage Empowerment Party		
Minister for Agriculture & Livestock	Tommy Tomscoll	Madang Province	People's Democratic Movement Party		
Minister for Bougainville Affairs	Steven Kamma	Autonomous Region of Bougainville	United Resources Party		
Minister for Civil Aviation	Davis Steven	Milne Bay Province	People's Party		
Minister for Communication & Information Technology	Jimmy Miringtoro	Autonomous Region of Bougainville	People's National Congress Party		
Minister for Community Development, Religion & Youth	Loujaya Toni	Morobe Province	Indigenous People's Party		
Minister for Correctional Services	Jim Simatab	East Sepik Province	National Alliance Party		
Minister for Defence	Fabian Pok	Jiwaka Province	United Resources Party		
Minister for Education	Paru Aihi	Central Province	People's National Congress Party		
Minister for Environment & Conservation	John Pundari	Enga Province	People's Party		
Minister for Finance	James Marape	Hela Province	People's National Congress Party		
Minister for Fisheries & Marine Resources	Mao Zeming	Morobe Province	People's National Congress Party		
Minister for Foreign Affairs & Immigration	Rimbink Pato	Enga Province	United Party		
Minister for Forests & Climate Change	Patrick Pruaitch	West Sepik Province	National Alliance Party		
Minister for Health & HIV/AIDS	Michael Malabag	National Capital District	People's National Congress Party		
Minister for Higher Education, Research, Science, & Technology	Francis Marus				
Minister for Housing & Urban Development	Paul Isikiel	Morobe Province	People's National Congress Party		
Minister for Justice & Attorney-General	Kerenga Kua	Chimbu Province	National Alliance Party		
Minister for Labour & Industrial Relations	Mark Maipakai	Gulf Province	Triumph Heritage Empowerment Party		
Minister for Lands & Physical Planning	Benny Allan	Eastern Highlands Province	People's National Congress Party		
Minister for Mining	Byron Chan	New Ireland Province	People's Progress Party		
Minister for National Planning	Charles Abel	Milne Bay Province	People's National Congress Party		
Minister for Petroleum & Energy	William Duma	Western Highlands Province	United Resources Party		
Minister for Police	Nixon Duban	Madang Province	People's National Congress Party		
Minister for Public Enterprises & State Investment	Ben Micah	New Ireland Province	People's Progress Party		
Minister for Public Service	Sir Puka Temu	Central Province	Our Development Party		
Minister for Sports & Pacific Games	Justin Tkatchenko	National Capital District	Social Democratic Party		
Minister for Tourism, Art & Culture	Boka Kondra	Western Province	People's National Congress Party		
Minister for Trade, Commerce & Industry	Richard Maru	East Sepik Province	Independent		
Minister for Transport & Works	Ano Pala	Central Province	People's National Congress Party		
Minister for Treasury	Don Polye	Enga Province	Triumph Heritage Empowerment Party		
Minister for Works & Implementation	Francis Awesa	Southern Highlands Province	People's National Congress Party		

==== 2014 cabinet reshuffle ====
In February 2014, the following reshuffle took place. Police Minister Nixon Duban (MP for Madang, National Congress Party) was reshuffled to the position of Minister of Petroleum and Energy, replacing William Duma (MP for Mount Hagen, United Resources Party), who was dropped from the Cabinet; O'Neill suggested that Duma had not adhered to the principle of Cabinet solidarity. Robert Atiyafa (MP for Henganofi) was appointed as Minister for Police. David Arore (MP for the Northern Province, T.H.E. Party) was replaced as Minister for Higher Education by Delilah Gore (MP for Sohe, T.H.E. Party), while Nick Kuman (MP for Gumine) was appointed Minister for Education. It was the first time ever that the country's Cabinet included two women: Delilah Gore, and Community Development Minister Loujaya Kouza (MP for Lae).

On 10 March 2014, O'Neill sacked his Minister for Finance Don Polye (leader of the T.H.E. Party, the second-largest party in the government), and Minister for Industrial Relations Mark Maipakai, having accused them of destabilising the government.

In August 2014, Community Development Minister Loujaya Kouza resigned to serve as interim chair Lae City Commission. In a reshuffle, she was replaced by Delilah Gore, who in turn was replaced as Minister for Higher Education by Malakai Tabar. William Duma, ousted from the government in February, was re-admitted, this time as Minister for Transport.

In August 2015 Minister for Religion, Youth and Community Development Delilah Gore was suspended for three months without pay after verbally assaulting and threatening a flight attendant who had asked her to turn off her mobile phone on an Air Niugini flight. (Gore was removed from the plane as a consequence of her behaviour.)

In July 2016, Minister for Petroleum and Energy Ben Micah resigned from the government and joined the Opposition. He was replaced by Nixon Duban, who was in turn replaced as Minister for Transport by Malakai Tabar. Tabar was replaced as Minister for Higher Education by Francis Marus (MP for Talasea), who was promoted from the back benches.

=== Somare Cabinet 2007-2011 ===
In the 2007 general election, the National Alliance-led government headed by Sir Michael Somare was returned. The first Cabinet of the new government was announced on 29 August 2007.

The Cabinet contained 28 ministers. They were assisted by 12 parliamentary secretaries, who were not officially part of the Cabinet.

Media comment on the new cabinet focused on the demotion of the previous Deputy Prime Minister Don Polye, the relatively low number of Highlands MPs in Cabinet, and the potential for conflict of interest in the appointment of Belden Namah, a forest landowner and principal of a company involved in logging in West Sepik Province, as Forestry Minister.

The Opposition's shadow ministry was announced on 31 August 2007.

On 14 August 2009, Don Polye was removed from his position as Member of Parliament, and Minister for Works, Transport & Civil Aviation, when the National Court determined that his victory in the 2007 general election was invalid. The Prime Minister assumed responsibility for Polye's Transport and Works ministries as an interim measure until Polye's by-election is held on 9 November 2009, while Culture and Tourism Minister Charles Abel acquired the Civil Aviation ministerial portfolio.

In May 2010, Attorney-General and Justice Minister Allan Marat, leader of the Melanesian Liberal Party, publicly criticised aspects of government policy, and resigned upon being asked to do so by Prime Minister Michael Somare. Ano Pala, National Alliance Party MP for Rigo, was appointed in his place.

This was the Cabinet as of February 2011. (The list of parliamentary secretaries is also accurate as of February 2011. The list of Shadow Ministers, however, is from September 2007.)

Portfolio	Minister	Minister's province	Minister's party	Parliamentary secretary	Opposition shadow minister
Prime Minister; Autonomy and Autonomous regions	Sir Michael Somare	East Sepik	NA		Sir Mekere Morauta (PNGP)
Deputy Prime Minister; Works	Sam Abal	Enga	NA		(Transport, Civil Aviation, Works) Tony Puana (NGP)
Finance and Treasury	Peter O'Neill	Southern Highlands	PNC		Bart Philemon (NGP)
Foreign Affairs; Immigration	Don Polye				
Public Service	Moses Maladina		RDP	Anthony Nene	Isaac Joseph (NGP)
Trade; Bougainville Affairs	Fidelis Semoso	East Sepik	PAP	(Foreign Affairs, Trade and Immigration) Sali Subam (NA)	(Bougainville) Koni Iguan (PLP)
Education	James Marape		NA	David Arore (NA)	Ferao Orimyo (PNGP)
National Planning; Rural Development	Paul Tiensten	East New Britain	NA	(National Planning and Monitoring) Phillip Kikala	
Commerce; Industry	Gabriel Kapris	East Sepik	PAP		Bonny Oveyara (PPP)
Petroleum and Energy	William Duma	Western Highlands	URP		Francis Potabe Mulungu (NGP)
Housing and Urban Development	Andrew Kumbakor	West Sepik	Pangu		Theo Zurenouc (PPP)
Defence	Bob Dadae	Morobe	UP		
Higher Education, Research, Science and Technology	Paru Aihi		PNGP	Jack Cameron (PDM)	
Justice; Attorney-General	Sir Arnold Amet		NA		
Community Development; Women; Religion	Dame Carol Kidu	NCD	MA		
Public Enterprises	Arthur Somare	East Sepik	NA	David Arore	Sir Mekere Morauta (PNGP)
Agriculture and Livestock	Ano Pala	Central	NA		Puri Ruing (PNGP)
Environment and Conservation	Benny Allan	Eastern Highlands	URP	Roy Biyama (URP)	
Sports	Philemon Embel	Southern Highlands	Pangu		
Labour and Industrial Relations	Sani Rambi	Western Highlands	NA		Sam Basil (PPP)
Health and HIV/AIDS	Sasa Zibe	Morobe	NA	(Health) Yawa Silupa (NA)	
Internal Security	Mark Maipakai	Gulf	NA		Byron Chan (PPP)
Fisheries	Ben Semri	Madang	PAP		Sam Basil (PPP)
Forestry	Timothy Bonga		NA		Isaac Joseph (NGP)
Corrective Services	Tony Aimo	East Sepik	PAP		
Communication and Information	Patrick Tammur	East New Britain	NA		
Inter-Government Relations	Job Pomat	Manus	PNC		Koni Iguan (PLP)
Administrative Services; Transport; Minister assisting the Prime Minister on Constitutional Matters	Francis Potape		URP		Koni Iguan (PLP)
Culture; Tourism	Guma Wau		URP		Byron Chan (PPP)
Civil Aviation	Benjamin Popanawa		NA		
Lands	Lucas Dekene		NA		(Lands and Physical Planning) Theo Zurenouc (PPP)
Mining	John Pundari		People's Party		Francis Awesa (PNGP)

== See also ==
- Executive council (Commonwealth countries)
