= Next Papua New Guinean general election =

- No later than 2027
- All 124 seats in the National Parliament; 63 seats needed for a majority
Party	Leader	Current seats
Pangu Pati	James Marape	39
PNC	Joseph Lelang	17
URP	William Duma	11
NAP	Allan Bird	5
People's Party	Peter Ipatas	4
SDP	Powes Parkop	4
PFP	Richard Maru	4
PNG Party	Belden Namah	3
ULP	Vacant	3
Advance PNG	Muglua Dilu	2
National Party	Kerenga Kua	2
Liberal Party	John Thomas Pundari	2
AP	Bryan Kramer	1
PNG Greens	Richard Masere	1
MAP	Joseph Yopyyopy	1
NGP	Keith Iduhu	1
ODP	Puka Temu	1
PLP	Luther Wenge	1
PMC	Gary Juffa	1
PPP	Julius Chan	1
PRP	James Donald	1
Destiny Party	Marsh Narawec	1
THE Party	Don Polye	1
Independents	–	9

Incumbent Prime Minister
James Marape; Pangu Pati

General elections will be held in Papua New Guinea at some point in or before 2027 to elect members of the National Parliament.

== Background ==
At the previous elections in 2022 the Pangu Pati, led by James Marape, won 39 seats, gaining 30 seats, in a landslide victory. However, no party won a majority of seats, which is common in Papua New Guinean elections.

== Electoral system ==
The 124 members of the National Parliament are elected from single-member constituencies by limited instant-runoff voting; voters are given up to three preferences, with a candidate declared elected once they received over 50% of preference votes. Of the 124 members, 102 are elected from "open" seats (increased from 96 in the 2022 elections), with the remainder elected from "provincial" seats based on the twenty provinces, the Autonomous Region of Bougainville and the National Capital District. The winners of the provincial seats also become the provincial governor.

== Campaign ==
Along with common key issues such as crime, employment and poverty, one specific issue for debate will be the status of the Autonomous Region of Bougainville, where 98% of the population voted for independence in a 2019 referendum. Bougainville is expected to achieve independence by 2027 if an agreement is ratified by the National Parliament.
