= 2022 Papua New Guinean general election =

- 4–22 July 2022
- All 118 seats in the National Parliament; 60 seats needed for a majority
Party	Leader	Seats	+/–
Pangu Pati	James Marape	39	+30
PNC	Peter O'Neill	17	−11
URP	William Duma	11	+1
NAP	Allan Bird	6	−9
People's Party	Peter Ipatas	4	+2
SDP	Powes Parkop	4	+2
PFP	Richard Maru	4	+4
PNG Party	Belden Namah	3	−2
ULP	Vacant	3	New
Advance PNG	Muglua Dilu	2	New
National Party	Kerenga Kua	2	−1
Liberal	John Thomas Pundari	2	New
AP	Bryan Kramer	1	New
PNG Greens	Richard Masere	1	+1
MAP	Joseph Yopyyopy	1	0
NGP	Keith Iduhu	1	+1
ODP	Puka Temu	1	0
PLP	Luther Wenge	1	−1
PMC	Gary Juffa	1	0
PPP	Julius Chan	1	−4
PRP	James Donald	1	New
Destiny Party	Marsh Narawec	1	+1
THE Party	Don Polye	1	−3
Independents	–	10	−4
This lists parties that won seats. See the complete results below.

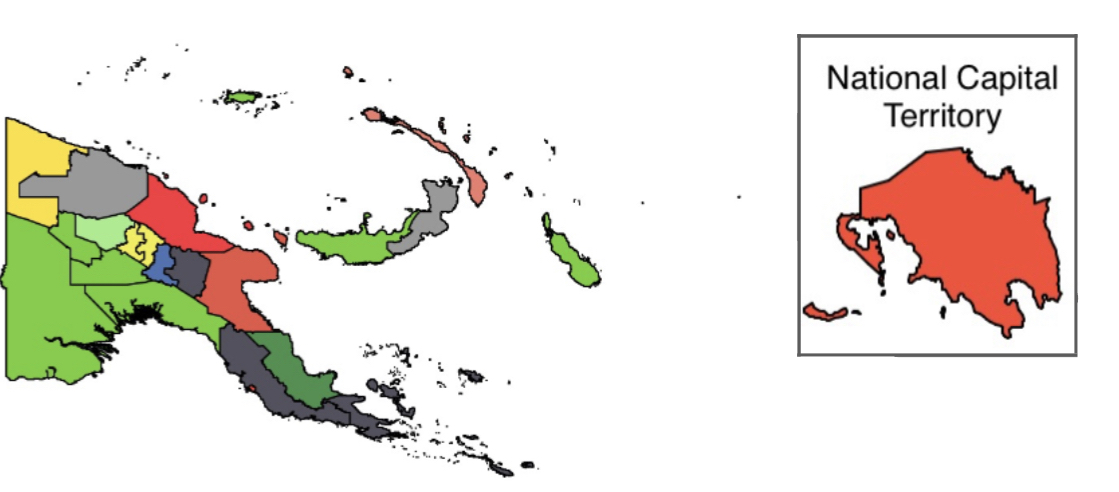
Prime Minister before	Prime Minister after
James Marape; Pangu Pati	James Marape; Pangu Pati

General elections were held in Papua New Guinea from 4 to 22 July 2022 to elect the members of the National Parliament for a new five-year term.

== Background ==
During the previous elections in 2017, the People's National Congress (PNC), led by prime minister Peter O'Neill, won a plurality, securing 28 seats. The National Alliance Party (NAP) won 15 seats; the United Resources Party (URP) secured ten seats whilst the Pangu Pati won nine. The People's Progress Party and the Papua New Guinea Party won five seats each, the Triumph Heritage Empowerment Rural Party secured four seats, whilst the National Party won three seats. The People's Labour Party (PLP), the Social Democratic Party (SDP) and the People's Party won two seats each. Independents won 14 seats, and minor parties secured the remainder. No women were elected, which made Papua New Guinea one of the few countries in the world at the time to have no female members of the national legislature. Significant irregularities marred that election, with a minimum of sixteen electoral officials arrested for corruption. The National Parliament re-elected Peter O'Neill as prime minister.

In 2019, cabinet members and the ruling coalition began to express discontent toward O'Neill's leadership, with many defecting to the opposition. O'Neill resigned from the premiership on 29 May after it became apparent that he would lose a vote of no confidence.

James Marape, who served as O'Neill's minister of finance and had defected from the PNC to the Pangu Pati shortly before, was elected by the National Parliament to succeed O'Neill as prime minister. In October 2019, Marape became the leader of the Pangu Pati.

In December 2019, the autonomous region of Bougainville voted in a landslide for independence from Papua New Guinea. Due to the country's immense ethnic and linguistic diversity, some national parliament members feared that Bougainville's departure could inspire other regions to demand independence from Papua New Guinea. In 2021, the autonomous region's president, Ishmael Toroama, announced that Bougainville would declare independence by 2027.

Marape's government faced a crisis in November 2020 that saw the defection of numerous cabinet ministers and other coalition members to the opposition. Marape then attempted to pass an emergency budget in 2021 without the presence of the opposition. Although it passed, the supreme court declared the session unconstitutional. Marape then recessed parliament for four months to ensure he did not lose a vote of no confidence before the 2022 election.

Deputy prime minister Sam Basil was killed in a car accident on 11 May 2022. His death, which occurred hours before nominations were scheduled to open, caused the electoral commission to delay the election until July. Basil was succeeded by John Rosso, who was sworn in on 25 May.

== Electoral system ==
The 118 members of the National Parliament are elected from single-member constituencies by limited instant-runoff voting; voters are given up to three preferences, with a candidate declared elected once they received over 50% of preference votes. Of the 118 members, 96 are elected from "open" seats and 22 from provincial seats based on the twenty provinces, the Autonomous Region of Bougainville and the National Capital District. The winners of the provincial seats also become the provincial governor.

Vote counting began on 29 July. Due to the voting system, vote staggering and how rural much of the country is, the vote counting usually takes several weeks.

== Campaign ==
The voting period, staggered from 9 to 22 July, is preceded by an official campaign period from 12 May to 8 July, during which over 3,000 candidates competed.

== Conduct ==
In early June Australia sent 130 troops to Papua New Guinea to assist with the electoral process in logistics and air transport to transfer election material throughout the country for the duration of the election and subsequent tallying process.

Voting commenced on 4 July. Joseph Tondop, the police chief superintendent, warned voters not to engage in the practice of vote-buying. He also guaranteed that the presence of security forces would ensure that the elections would be "free, fair and safe and transparent".

The Commonwealth of Nations sent a delegation headed by the former president of Nauru, Baron Waqa, to observe the electoral process.

As in the previous election, significant issues arose once voting commenced. Due to an outdated electoral roll, authorities turned away an estimated one million voters at polling stations throughout the country, which led to outrage among the denied voters, with individuals in the provinces of Hela and East Sepik responding by setting ballot papers ablaze and damaging ballot boxes. Some polling stations reportedly used rolls from the 2017 or 2012 elections. The electoral commission postponed voting on several occasions in Port Moresby due to logistical issues. Many polling stations had insufficient ballot papers.

Incidents of violence occurred with a young woman killed at a polling station allegedly by police while waiting to cast her vote. Witnesses claim the attack was unprovoked.

Voting ended on 22 July.

== Preliminary results ==
Prime Minister James Marape and his Deputy Prime Minister John Rosso were easily re-elected to Parliament: The former obtained 66.8% of the votes from the first count in his constituency of Tari and the second 50.09% of the votes at the first count in his constituency of Lae. The Leader of the Parliamentary Opposition, Patrick Pruaitch (leader of the National Alliance Party), was beaten in his Aitape-Lumi constituency, which he had represented in Parliament from 2002. People's National Congress candidate, Anderson Mise, won this seat. Peter O'Neill (leader of the People's National Congress), another major opposition figure and former Prime Minister, was re-elected in his constituency of Ialibu-Pangia.

The Minister of Agriculture John Simon (Pangu Pati) was defeated in his constituency of Maprik, in the 26th round of vote counting, by the candidate of the People's National Congress, Gabriel Kapris, former Minister of Commerce and Industries. Former Prime Minister Sir Julius Chan (People's Progress Party) was re-elected governor and MP for the province of New Ireland, in the first count with 54.7% of the vote. Another former prime minister, Paias Wingti (People's Democratic Movement), lost his post as governor of the Western Highlands province and as a member of parliament.

While Parliament had no female MPs during the 2017-2022 legislature, two candidates were successful in the 2022 election. The economist Rufina Peter (People's National Congress) was elected MP and Governor of the Central Province; defeating the incumbent, Robert Agarobe (Pangu Pati). Kessy Sawang (People First Party) won the Rai Coast Constituency.

Allan Marat (Melanesian Liberal Party), a figure in the fight against corruption, MP since 2002 and former Deputy Prime Minister and Attorney General, was beaten by only three votes in his constituency of Rabaul. He obtained, 49.99% against 50.01% for his opponent Graham Rumet of Pangu Pati. This was the closest result in the history of Papua New Guinea's parliamentary elections.

Michael Marum, former coach of the Papua New Guinea rugby league team, was elected governor and MP for the province of East New Britain. William Nakin, Member of Parliament for Bougainville-North for the National Alliance Party, was re-elected post-mortem, having died on 12 July during the ballot.

Party	Seats
Pangu Pati	39
People's National Congress Party	17
United Resources Party	11
National Alliance	6
People's Party	4
Social Democratic Party	4
People First Party	4
Papua New Guinea Party	3
United Labour Party	3
Advance PNG Party	2
National Party	2
Liberal Party	2
Allegiance Party	1
Green Party	1
Melanesian Alliance Party	1
New Generation Party	1
Our Development Party	1
People's Labour Party	1
People's Movement for Change	1
People's Progress Party	1
People's Reform Party	1
Papua New Guinea Destiny Party	1
Triumph Heritage Empowerment Party	1
Independents	10
Total	118
Source: Development Policy Centre

=== Seats changing hands ===
Electorate	Before election			Swing	After election		
Electorate	Party	Member	Margin	Swing	Margin	Party	Member
Bougainville Provincial	URP	Joe Lera				Pangu	Peter Tsiamalli Jr.
Central Provincial	Pangu	Robert Agarobe				PNC	Rufina Peter
Chimbu Provincial	URP	Michael Dua				Liberal	Noah Kool
East New Britain Provincial	PPP	Nakikus Konga				Independent	Michael Marum
Eastern Highlands Provincial	One Nation	Peter Numu				PNC	Simon Sung Sing Sia
Jiwaka Provincial	PP	William Tongamp				URP	Simon Kaiwi
Madang Provincial	PLP	Peter Yama				People First	Ramsey Pariwa
Morobe Provincial	Pangu	Ginson Saonu				PLP	Luther Wenge
Western Highlands Provincial	PDM	Paias Wingti				URP	Wai Rapa

== Aftermath ==
Following the elections, Marape was re-elected prime minister unopposed.

== See also ==
- Members of the National Parliament of Papua New Guinea, 2022–2027
