= Charles Abel (politician) =

Papua New Guinea politician (born 1967)

The Honourable Charles Abel MP
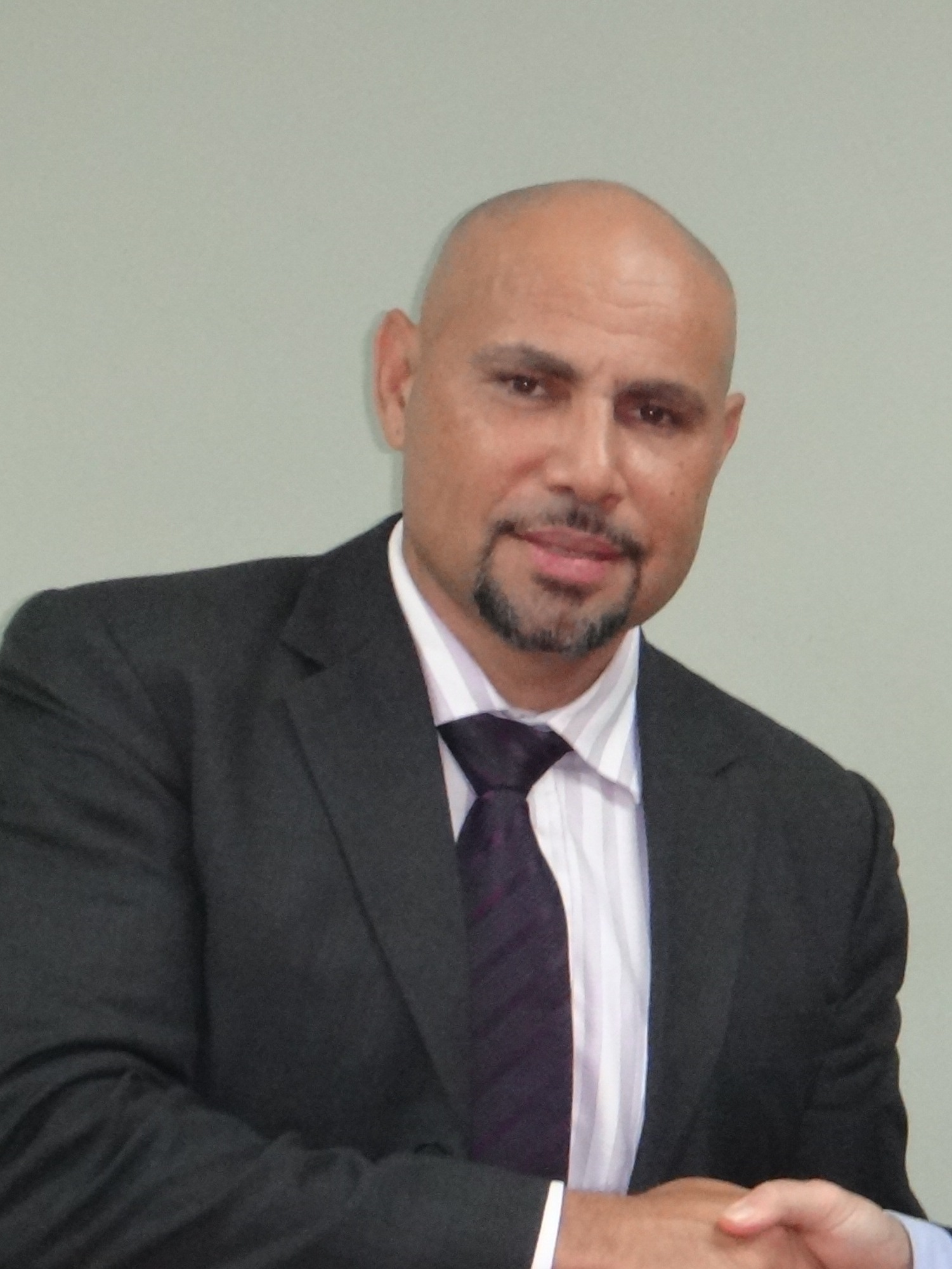
- Charles Abel in 2013

Minister for Finance and Rural Development
- In office 7 June 2019 – 8 November 2019
- Prime Minister: James Marape
- Preceded by: Richard Maru
- Succeeded by: Renbo Paita

Deputy Prime Minister of Papua New Guinea
- In office August 2017 – 31 May 2019
- Prime Minister: Peter O'Neill
- Preceded by: Leo Dion
- Succeeded by: Davis Steven

Treasurer
- In office August 2017 – 31 May 2019
- Prime Minister: Peter O'Neill
- Succeeded by: Sam Basil

Minister for National Planning
- In office 2012–2017
- Prime Minister: Peter O'Neill
- Succeeded by: Richard Maru

Minister for Trade, Commerce and Industry
- In office 5 August 2011 – 2012
- Prime Minister: Peter O'Neill

Minister for Culture and Tourism
- In office 29 August 2007 – July 2010
- Prime Minister: Michael Somare

Member of the National Parliament of Papua New Guinea
- Incumbent
- Assumed office 6 August 2007
- Preceded by: Isaac Taitibe
- Constituency: Alotau Open

Personal details
- Born: 24 September 1967 (age 59)
- Party: Our Development Party (2019–)
- Other political affiliations: People's National Congress (2011–2019); National Alliance Party (2007-2011); Independent (2007)
- Occupation: Politician
- Profession: Accountant

Charles Abel (born 24 September 1967) is a politician in Papua New Guinea. He was a member of the National Parliament of Papua New Guinea from 2007-2022, representing the electorate of Alotau Open. He competed for the regional seat (governor) in Milne Bay Province -of which Alotau is the capital- in 2022 but he lost. Charles Abel has occupied several cabinet positions. He was from 2007-2010 minister of Culture and Tourism. He was Minister for Trade, Commerce and Industry in 2011-2012. In the period 2012-2017 he was Minister for National Planning. From August 2017-May 2019 he was Deputy Prime Minister and Treasurer. In 2019 he was from June–November Minister for Finance and Rural Development. He is active in policy making for natural resources.

== Personal background ==
Charles Abel was born in Bereina, Central Province. Abel is the great-grandson of his namesake, the missionary reverend Charles Abel. The Abel lineage brought church, health and education to many parts of Milne Bay province. His secondary schooling he did in Australia at Immanuel Lutheran College, Buderim, Queensland. He thereafter completed a Bachelor of Economics at the University of Queensland in 1989. Abel is an accountant by profession. He mentions as his occupations prior to elections: Financial controller with Global Constructions, Ipili Porgera Investments and businessman in Milne Bay. He also made name as vocalist in a band Wabo Knights.

== Political career ==
Abel was elected to the National Parliament as an independent at the 2007 election, but joined the governing National Alliance Party upon his election, stating that he and other Milne Bay politicians had been "promised a better share of the cake". On 28 August 2007, he was appointed Minister for Culture and Tourism in the Somare government. His time as Minister for Culture and Tourism saw an agreement with his Chinese counterpart on Approved Destination Status for Papua New Guinea, a wide range of issues regarding the popular Kokoda Track, including preservation, nearby mining, track access, and airline connections, and seeking the return of illegally exported artefacts. During this time he also initiated a Settlement Reform Committee in Milne Bay to address the issue of squatter settlements, and while acting as Minister for Civil Aviation dealt with the response to the Airlines PNG Flight 4684 crash.

On 19 July 2010, Abel and three other ministers, Belden Namah, Puka Temu and Ano Pala, defected to the opposition and attempted a vote of no confidence in Somare, which was unsuccessful when Somare succeeded in adjourning parliament instead. Although sacked as Minister by Somare in the aftermath, when the motion again came up in November, Abel wrote a letter indicating that he wished to withdraw his support for it, and it again failed. In a June 2011 ministerial reshuffle, he was appointed Minister Assisting the Prime Minister on Constitutional and Electoral Matters in a ministerial reshuffle by Acting Prime Minister Sam Abal.

On 2 August 2011, Abel supported a no-confidence motion in Acting Prime Minister Abal and voted to elect Peter O'Neill as the new Prime Minister. He stated that he had advised Abal on numerous occasions of "dissatisfactions within the government" but that Abal had been "slow in executing his powers". He was subsequently appointed Minister for Commerce, Industry and Trade in the O'Neill government. He subsequently joined O'Neill's People's National Congress party, and was later re-elected under that banner at the 2012 election. Following his re-election, he was promoted to Minister for National Planning by O'Neill in August. As Minister for National Planning, his role has included individual infrastructure projects, addressing public service corruption, a long-running project to introduce a biometric national identification card, the implementation of a sustainable development strategy, and issues with aid delivery and the Australian detention centre at Manus Island.

In August 2017, Abel was promoted to Deputy Prime Minister under Peter O'Neill following the defeat of his predecessor Leo Dion at the 2017 election. He lost the position in the First Marape Cabinet. He was the Minister for Finance and Rural Development from 7 June 2019 to 8 November 2019.
