= Sam Basil =

Papua New Guinean politician (1969–2022)

The Honourable Sam Basil MP
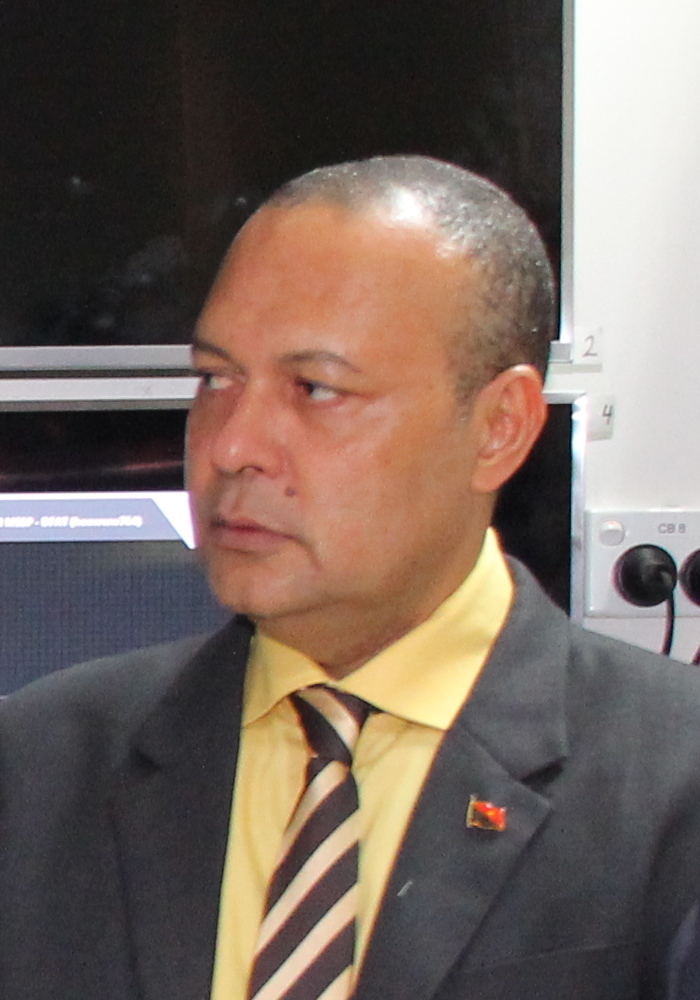
- Basil in 2018

Deputy Prime Minister of Papua New Guinea
- In office 1 October 2020 – 11 May 2022
- Prime Minister: James Marape
- Preceded by: Davis Steven
- Succeeded by: John Rosso

Treasurer of Papua New Guinea
- In office 7 June 2019 – 27 August 2019
- Prime Minister: James Marape
- Preceded by: Charles Abel
- Succeeded by: Ian Ling-Stuckey

Minister for National Planning and Monitoring
- In office 13 May 2019 – 31 May 2019
- Prime Minister: Peter O'Neill

Minister of Finance
- In office 17 April 2019 – 13 May 2019
- Prime Minister: Peter O'Neill
- Preceded by: James Marape
- Succeeded by: Richard Maru

Minister for Communications, Information Technology and Energy
- In office 2017 – 17 April 2019
- Prime Minister: Peter O'Neill

Minister for National Planning
- In office 5 August 2011 – 2012
- Prime Minister: Michael Somare

Member of the National Parliament of Papua New Guinea
- In office 2007 – 11 May 2022
- Preceded by: John Muingnepe
- Constituency: Bulolo Open

Personal details
- Born: Samuel H. Basil; 16 November 1969 Bulolo, Papua and New Guinea, Australia
- Died: 11 May 2022 (aged 52) Morobe Province, Papua New Guinea
- Party: United Labour Party (2019–2022)
- Other political affiliations: Pangu Party (2014–2019); Papua New Guinea Party (2011–2014); People's Progress Party (2002–2011); Melanesian Alliance Party (2019–2022)
- Children: Sam Basil Jr.

Samuel H. Basil (16 November 1969 – 11 May 2022) was a Papua New Guinean politician. He was a member of the National Parliament of Papua New Guinea from 2007, representing the electorate of Bulolo Open, until his death in 2022. From 8 June 2019, to August 2019 Basil served as the Treasurer of Papua New Guinea.

On 1 October 2020, Basil was appointed Deputy Prime Minister of Papua New Guinea in a cabinet reshuffle by Prime Minister James Marape, while also maintaining his existing portfolio as Minister for National Planning. He served as deputy prime minister until his death in office in May 2022.

== Early life ==
Basil was born on 16 November 1969 in Bulolo. He was educated at Bumayong Lutheran Secondary School and was a businessman prior to entering politics, where he was managing director of seafood and aquaculture company BSJ Fishing and Trading. He was also a board member of the Morobe Fisheries Management Authority.

== Early political career ==
He was an unsuccessful candidate for the People's Progress Party at the 2002 election.

He was elected to the National Parliament in the 2007 election for the People's Progress Party, and immediately became its deputy leader, with the party in the opposition. Key issues in his first term were the improvement of district roads, managing issues associated with the Wafi and Hidden Valley mining projects, and occasional ethnic unrest. In 2009, Basil was involved in a deal which saw the people of Bulolo District assigned a half share of the provincial government's share of the Morobe Mining Joint Venture.

In December 2009, he claimed the National Parliament building was unfit for occupation and should be condemned. He was a member of the Public Accounts Committee when it reported, in the same month, that only five out of nearly 1000 government agencies had met accountability and transparency requirements, describing it as a "sign of a failed state" and threatening to resign from the committee if prosecutions were not initiated against those who had misused funds. In July 2010, Prime Minister Michael Somare told Basil during a parliamentary no-confidence vote "if you were outside I would kill you", which received wide media attention.

== Opposition Leader ==
On 10 January 2011, Basil resigned from the People's Progress Party and joined the Papua New Guinea Party (PNGP), then the largest opposition party. On 11 May 2011, he became Deputy Opposition Leader under PNGP leader Belden Namah. He was a trenchant critic of Somare in the months prior to the no-confidence vote that ousted Somare in favour of Peter O'Neill in August 2011, repeatedly assailing the government regarding alleged corruption and the state of Somare's health. He was subsequently appointed Minister for National Planning in the new O'Neill government on 5 August 2011, and was also the responsible minister for new anti-corruption investigative body Task Force Sweep.

In May 2012, a reported crowd of 10,000 came to witness his renomination for the 2012 election, at which he stated that he was defending his seat to finish incomplete projects in his ten months as minister. He was re-elected, standing for the Papua New Guinea Party, in July, receiving an absolute majority of the vote in a crowded field of candidates. O'Neill dumped the PNGP from his governing coalition after the election, having fallen out with leader Namah, costing Basil his ministry. Basil filed a court challenge to prevent from sitting while final election writs were returned, which delayed but did not prevent O'Neill from being sworn in for a full term.

Basil was again named Deputy Opposition Leader in August 2012, while also serving as Shadow Minister for National Planning, District Development and Health and HIV/AIDS. In the same month, he repeatedly criticised the O'Neill government over a reported travel ban preventing foreign journalists from visiting Manus Island, home to the Australian Manus Regional Processing Centre. In October, he voiced strong opposition to deep sea mining in Papua New Guinea. Basil organised a rural electrification program back in his own district, which was well-received. He remained in the opposition as its numbers declined to only six by May 2013, as various MPs defected to the government.

Basil was heavily critical of the deal which allowed for the expansion of the Manus detention centre, and was involved in an opposition legal challenge claiming that it was unconstitutional. In September 2013, Basil was one of only two MPs to vote no on a bill which restricted no-confidence votes, requiring a month's notice and a minimum of 22 MPs. He repeatedly complained throughout much of his second term that he and other opposition MPs were having difficulty accessing their District Service Improvement Program funds, in contrast to government MPs, and was repeatedly praised in media coverage for improving local services in spite of the interference. In June 2014, Prime Minister O'Neill asked police to investigate Basil and sacked anti-corruption head Sam Koim, claiming that they had colluded to oppose him.

In August 2014, Basil resigned from the Papua New Guinea Party and joined the Pangu Party, immediately becoming party leader. Pangu, the oldest party in Papua New Guinea and one-time governing party, had not been represented in parliament since the 2013 death of Ludwig Schulze, its sole member to be re-elected in 2012. After some confusion about the loyalties of the revived party, he continued as Deputy Leader of the Opposition. He continued as deputy after Don Polye ousted Namah as Opposition Leader in December 2014. In August 2015, he was joined by a second Pangu MP when their endorsed candidate, William Samb, won a by-election in Goilala Open. He continued to campaign around the interference with DSIP funds of opposition MPs, claiming that past governments had not discriminated against the opposition in the way that O'Neill had. In April 2016, he saw the opposition's long-running court case regarding the Manus Island detention centre decided in their favour, with the Supreme Court ruling that it was unconstitutional.

On 3 May 2016, Basil became Leader of the Opposition after the National Court upheld a challenge to Polye's 2012 election victory, set aside the result and ordered a belated recount of votes in his seat. However, he relinquished the leadership back to Polye on 26 May, two days after Polye won a stay of the earlier decision pending an appeal. He was comfortably re-elected at the 2017 election, at which he led a Pangu Party comeback, with the once-dormant party winning a number of seats.

On 7 May 2019, he left the Pangu Party to become the leader of the Melanesian Alliance Party. He then founded the United Labour Party.

As part of the First Marape Cabinet, Basil was appointed Treasurer on 7 June 2019.

== Death ==
Basil was killed in a car accident on 11 May 2022, one day before election nominations. He was replaced a minister by Henry Amuli.

== See also ==
- List of members of the Papua New Guinean Parliament who died in office
