= Jimmy Maladina =

Papua New Guinean politician

Jimmy Maladina is a Papua New Guinean politician from Pangu Pati who serves as Minister for Petroleum.

He was first elected to the Papua New Guinean Parliament in the 2022 general election in Esa'ala Open constituency. He unseated incumbent MP Davis Steven.

Maladina graduated from University of Papua New Guinea and the University of Sydney.

In July 2024, he was charged with assault following an alleged "domestic dispute" in Australia. On 7 July, Prime Minister James Marape said that Maladina had offered to resign from his position and was replaced on 10 July by Energy Minister Thomas Opa. The charges against him were dropped by prosecutors on 20 March 2025.

== See also ==
- Members of the National Parliament of Papua New Guinea, 2022–2027
