= Nixon Duban =

Papua New Guinean politician

Nixon Philip Duban is a Papua New Guinean politician. He was a People's National Congress member of the National Parliament of Papua New Guinea from 2012 until he was unseated by court decision in 2013 and again from a 2013 by-election until 2017. He was Minister for Police (August 2012 to June 2013 and January 2014 to February 2014), Minister for Petroleum and Energy (February 2014 to January 2016), Minister for Transport and Infrastructure (January 2016 to July 2016) and Minister for Petroleum and Energy (July 2016 until August 2016) in the government of Peter O'Neill.

Prior to entering politics, Duban was the president of the student wing of the People's Progress Party, general secretary of the People's National Congress and an executive officer to Prime Minister Peter O'Neill. He was an unsuccessful candidate for the same seat at the 2007 election.

Duban was elected to the National Parliament on his second attempt at the 2012 election, and was promoted to Minister for Police in O'Neill's post-election Cabinet reshuffle. As minister, he launched the Police Modernisation Concept, which saw K200 million additional funding to improve police vehicles, infrastructure and other logistics. On 3 June 2013, the National Court declared his 2012 victory null and void after finding that he had engaged in bribery and undue influence during the campaign, ordering a by-election in his seat. The Police Association responded by thanking Duban for his "foresight and vision" as minister and stating that their membership were "very grateful".

Duban won the by-election in December 2013, returned to parliament, and was reinstated as Minister for Police a month later. Several of his opponents had criticised the government for promising Duban a guaranteed position in Cabinet if he were to be returned, and having Prime Minister O'Neill retain Duban's former police portfolio in an acting capacity until after the by-election. In February 2014, he was promoted to Minister for Petroleum and Energy after the dumping of William Duma. He signed the development license for the Stanley gas condensate project in May. In June 2014, he suggested that Papua New Guinea should pass legislation to regulate social media in the country because "opportunists and social media freaks are abusing these freedoms and rights".

In October 2014, after a prolonged court-ordered recount of the 2013 by-election results, Duban was affirmed as having been duly re-elected. In November 2014, election petitioner Bryan Kramer was arrested on charges of conspiring to kill Duban, though these were dismissed in June 2015. In January 2016, Duban was shifted to the position of Minister for Transport and Infrastructure, but was moved back to Minister for Petroleum and Energy that July.

At the 2017 election, Duban lost his seat to Bryan Kramer, who had lodged the court petition that had unseated him back in 2013.

Nixon Duban was charged with Fraud, of 1.2M kina, by the Waigani Criminal Court in September 2020.

As noted in the PNG Newspaper, “ The National” and the “ Post Courier “, Nixon Duban was arrested and taken into Custody. Later released on Bail, he faces these charges of Fraud and the Case is being taken through the Court process.

This is the first time Nixon Duban has faced Fraud Charges by his political rival Bryan Kramer. He remains innocent until the determination of the allegations.

Bryan Kramer has taken him to court three times. The first two were related to election matters. The current allegations were undertaken on the eve of 2022 national election rendering it more like a planned move.

National Parliament of Papua New Guinea
Preceded by Buka Malai	Member for Madang Open; 2012–2013; 2013–2017	Succeeded by Bryan Kramer
