= Henry Amuli =

Papua New Guniean cabinet minister (since 2022)

Minister for Commerce and Industry
- Incumbent
- Assumed office April 2022
- Preceded by: William Samb

Personal details
- Party: Melanesian Alliance Party

Henry John Amuli is a Papua New Guinean politician. He represents Sohe Open in the National Parliament of Papua New Guinea.

== Political career ==
In April 2022, he was appointed to the Cabinet of Papua New Guinea. He became Minister of Commerce and Industry.

== See also ==
- Members of the National Parliament of Papua New Guinea, 2017–2022
