= Ano Pala =

Papua New Guinean politician

Ano Pala, KBE CMG ISO (born 15 September 1952) is a Papua New Guinean politician. He has been a member of the National Parliament of Papua New Guinea since 2007, representing the electorate of Rigo Open (in Central Province). He is Minister of Justice and Attorney-General in the government of Peter O'Neill.

He was elected to the National Parliament at the 2007 election and was initially a member of the National Alliance Party. In May 2010, he was appointed Attorney General and Minister of Justice in Prime Minister Michael Somare's Cabinet, replacing Allan Marat who had resigned after breaching Cabinet solidarity by criticising government policy. Pala had, until then, served as parliamentary secretary to Dr Puka Temu, the Minister of Lands and Physical Planning and Mining. In July 2010, he was one of four ministers to defect to the Opposition in an unsuccessful attempt to bring down the government, but later rejoined the government ranks and was appointed Minister for Foreign Affairs.

At the start of August 2011, he again defected to the Opposition, and this time helped to successfully bring down the government in a parliamentary motion of no confidence. Peter O'Neill became Prime Minister, and appointed Pala as his Minister for Foreign Affairs, Trade and Immigration.

Pala had previously served as parliamentary clerk, but resigned that position to stand (successfully) for Parliament in the 2007 general election.

In 2009, he publicly supported Eastern Highlands Provincial Governor Malcolm 'Kela' Smith who petitioned the government to "intervene to protect our citizens of [sic] the action of Asian businessmen", who he claimed had "exploited locals" by selling "cheap goods and counterfeit products", and by forcing employees to work long hours for low wages. Pala added that locals should be assisted in setting up their own businesses: there was a "need to support our education system, to create some of the basics of how to make money, how to run a business and how to understand the commercial and business system in the schools".

In January 2012, he joined Don Polye's new Triumph Heritage Empowerment Rural Party.

== Honours ==
In the 2001 New Year Honours, Pala was appointed to the Imperial Service Order, for public service.

He was appointed a Companion of the Order of St Michael and St George (CMG) in the 2007 Birthday Honours for service to the National Parliament and to sport.

Pala was knighted in the 2020 Birthday Honours, being appointed Knight Commander of the Order of the British Empire "for services to the Community and to the Parliament of Papua New Guinea."
