= Nick Kuman =

Papua New Guinea politician

The Honourable Nick Kuman MP
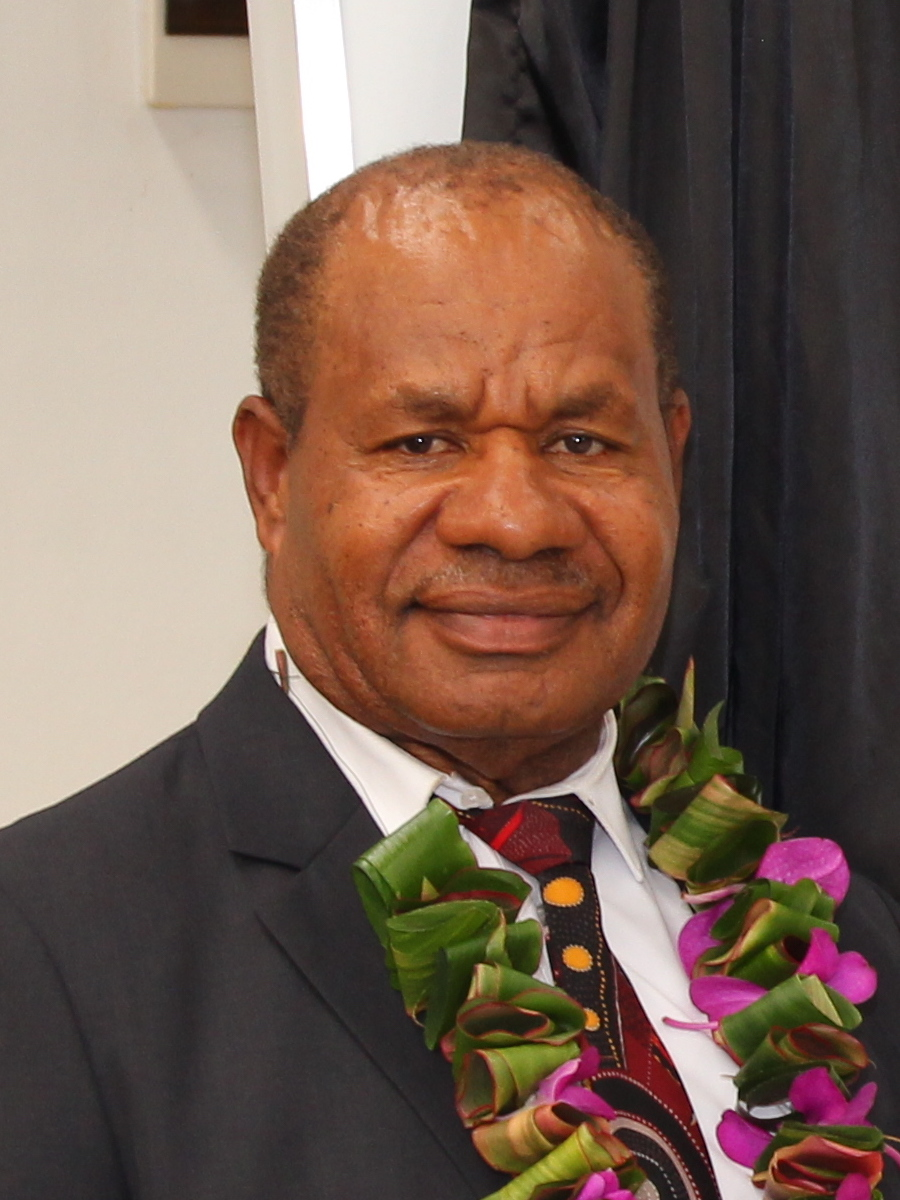
- Kuman in 2018

Minister for Higher Education, Research, and Science and Technology
- Incumbent
- Assumed office 7 June 2019
- Prime Minister: James Marape
- Preceded by: Pila Niningi

Minister for Education
- In office 24 February 2014 – 31 May 2019
- Prime Minister: Peter O'Neill

Minister for Culture and Tourism
- In office 19 January 2007 – 2012
- Prime Minister: Michael Somare

Minister for Culture and Tourism
- In office 2 August 2003 – 18 May 2004
- Prime Minister: Michael Somare

Member of the National Parliament of Papua New Guinea
- Incumbent
- Assumed office 2002
- Constituency: Gumine Open

Personal details
- Party: People's National Congress (2002–)
- Other political affiliations: Independent (2002)
- Education: University of Western Sydney

Nick Kopia Kuman is a Papua New Guinea politician. He is a Member of the National Parliament of Papua New Guinea, representing the seat of Gumine Open since 2002 as a member of People's National Congress.

== Early life ==
Kuman obtained a Bachelor of Applied Science (Environmental Management) with Honours from the University of Western Sydney, Australia. Prior to his election, he was employed by the National Capital District Commission for 19 years, and was the Deputy City Manager of the National Capital District.

== Political career ==
He was first elected to the National Parliament in the 2002 general election for Gumine Open as an Independent candidate, then joined People's National Congress. He was appointed as Minister for Culture and Tourism in the Somare/Marat cabinet from 2003 to 2004, and again from 2007 to 2012.

He was re-elected in the 2012 general election, but was declared duly elected in November 2013 following a vote recount. On 24 February 2014, he was appointed Minister for Education in the O'Neill-Dion Cabinet, and held this position for the remaining duration of O'Neill's leadership.

On 7 June 2019, he was appointed as Minister for Higher Education, Research, Science and Technology, as part of the First Marape Cabinet, replacing Pila Niningi.
