= Chris Nangoi =

Papua New Guinean politician (died 2022)

Minister of Penitentiary Services
- In office 7 June 2019 – 16 November 2020
- Preceded by: Roy Biyama
- Succeeded by: Joe Sungi

Member of the National Parliament of Papua New Guinea
- In office 8 July 2017 – 9 June 2022
- Preceded by: Puka Temu
- Constituency: Sumkar District

Personal details
- Born: Chris Yer Nangoi
- Died: 9 June 2022 Madang, Papua New Guinea
- Party: Pangu Pati; United Labour Party
- Education: Papua New Guinea University of Technology

Chris Yer Nangoi (died 9 June 2022) was a Papua New Guinean politician.

== Biography ==
Nangoi earned a degree in electrical and communications engineering from the Papua New Guinea University of Technology in Lae. In 2017, he was elected to the National Parliament, where he represented the Sumkar District for the Pangu Party. From June 2019 to November 2020 he was Minister of Penitentiary Services in the cabinet of Prime Minister James Marape. In 2019, he was one of the founders of the United Labour Party, a party to the Papua New Guinea Trade Union Congress.

Chris Nangoi died in Madang on 9 June 2022.
