= Francis Awesa =

Papua New Guinean politician

Francis Awesa (born 16 August 1951) is a Papua New Guinean politician. A former Premier of the Southern Highlands under the old provincial government system, he was a member of the National Parliament of Papua New Guinea from 2007 to 2017, representing the electorate of Imbonggu Open. A Papua New Guinea Party member in his first term, he subsequently switched to the People's National Congress after PNC leader Peter O'Neill became Prime Minister in 2011. He was Minister for Transport, Works and Civil Aviation (2011), Minister for Transport and Works (2011-2012) and Minister for Works and Implementation (2012-2017) in the government of Peter O'Neill.

== Business career and provincial politics ==
Awesa was educated at Kiburu Primary School and Mendi High School before graduating with a law degree from the University of Papua New Guinea in 1975 and a diploma in management from the Australian Administrative Staff College in 1978. He worked as an executive in business, for the Papua New Guinea Electricity Commission and as provincial secretary to the Southern Highlands provincial government. In 1994, he was elected Premier of the Southern Highlands, following the lifting of a two-year suspension of the Southern Highlands government. However, in 1995, the system of decentralised provincial government was abolished, and Awesa became deputy governor under national MP Dick Mune. He was subsequently sacked from that role by Mune after a series of disagreements.

He subsequently returned to business after leaving provincial politics, managing Mendi construction company Global Constructions. In February 2002, he formed the Southern Highlands Peace Commission in conjunction with bishops Stephen Joseph Reichert and Clarence Kavali in an attempt to end tribal fighting that had resulted in more than 120 deaths, and personally headed the initiative. The commission was successful in brokering a four-week ceasefire deal in March and a permanent settlement for the three-year-long conflict in May. He contested the Southern Highlands governorship as an independent at the 2003 supplementary election, held after the 2002 national election failed in the province due to fighting, but finished third behind Hami Yawari.

== First term in the National Parliament ==
Awesa was elected to the National Parliament in the Imbonggu seat at the 2007 election for the Papua New Guinea Party, and was appointed as the party's deputy leader after the election. In September 2008, he was a lone voice of dissent against large government tax breaks for an ExxonMobil natural gas project. He repeatedly attacked the Somare government for alleged corruption, declaring at a Western Highlands rally in October 2008 that the last five years had been "riddled with nothing but corruption" and that "Satan is the boss of the National Parliament" In December 2009, he reportedly declined an offer from Somare to become Minister for Internal Security. He vocally supported a 2010 court decision which weakened the Organic Law on the Integrity of Political Parties and Candidates such as to reinstate the right of MPs to resign from parties mid-term and limit restrictions on their ability to vote independently.

In September 2010, Awesa shifted to the crossbenches, declaring that he no longer had confidence in Opposition Leader Mekere Morauta. In August 2011, after Somare's ouster, he was appointed to the interim ministry of new Prime Minister Peter O'Neill as Minister of Works, Transport and Civil Aviation, although he later lost the civil aviation portfolio. In this role, he was required to deal with fallout from a series of disasters, including the October 2011 Airlines PNG Flight 1600, a fatal January 2011 landslide and the February 2012 sinking of the MV Rabaul Queen. He was awarded an OBE in July 2012 for service to commerce and politics as a Member of Parliament and Minister for State.

During the 2012 election, which he recontested for O'Neill's People's National Congress, he was involved in a number of controversies, with opponents and poling officials claiming to have been threatened by his supporters and an attempt to have him charged with contempt of court for breaching a court order restraining him from interfering with the counting of boxes. In late July, the electorate returning officer declared that his opponent had won, while the Chief Electoral Commissioner declared that Awesa had won, resulting in the returning officer going into hiding with a warrant for his arrest. On 31 July, the standoff was resolved with the Commissioner declaring Awesa elected following legal advice.

== Second term in the National Parliament ==
Awesa was appointed Minister for Works and Implementation after the 2012 election, losing the transport portfolio. In October 2012, his re-election was challenged in the National Court by opponent Pila Niningi. After the court dismissed Awesa's attempt to have the case thrown out as vexatious, it then shifted the trial from Mendi to Mount Hagen due to threats from his supporters. However, in January 2013, Niningu's challenge was dismissed on the grounds of incompetency, with leave to appeal being denied in April 2014. In his ministerial role, Awesa was faced with addressing a K1 billion backlog in road maintenance, widespread criticism over delays and misappropriated funds for repairing poor-quality roads in Lae, a number of key road projects, including a major bypass in Hela Province, issues of land compensation, and ongoing problems surrounding landslide damage on and blockades of the Highlands Highway by disgruntled protestors.

In November 2014, the Ombudsman Commission referred Awesa to the public prosecutor over alleged misconduct in office, which was referred to a leadership tribunal in May 2015. It was alleged that he had "unlawfully engrossed a public easement for personal use and in the process denied the public right of access to the easement, causing disharmony and difficulty". He was cleared by the Leadership Tribunal in July 2015, after which he blasted the Ombudsman for pursuing "trivial" proceedings. In November 2015, Awesa was revealed to be a co-director of and significant shareholder in Hornibrook NGI Ltd, which had received a multimillion-dollar contract for the Australian Manus Regional Processing Centre on Manus Island, sparking conflict of interest concerns.

He was defeated by Pila Ninigi at the 2017 election.

National Parliament of Papua New Guinea
Preceded by Timothy Tala	Member for Imbonggu Open; 2007–2017	Succeeded by Pila Ninigi
