= John Kaputin =

Papua New Guinea politician (born 1941)

The Honourable Sir John Kaputin KBE CMG

7th Secretary-general of African, Caribbean and Pacific Group of States
- In office 1 March 2005 – 28 February 2010
- Preceded by: Jean-Robert Goulongana
- Succeeded by: Mohamed Ibn Chambas

Personal details
- Born: 11 July 1941 (age 84)

Sir John Rumet Kaputin, KBE CMG (born 11 July 1941) is a Papua New Guinean athlete and politician.

== Early life and education ==
Kaputin was born on 11 July 1941 on Matupit Island, East New Britain Province. After his primary schooling in the province, he proceeded onto Rockhampton Boys Grammar School in Queensland, Australia (1956-1959) where he completed his secondary school.

== Career ==
=== Athletic career ===
He represented Papua and New Guinea as a sprinter at the 1962 British Empire and Commonwealth Games.

He then qualified for a scholarship to study at the University of Hawaiʻi in Honolulu (1966 – 1968), after which returned home to complete his studies at the University of Papua New Guinea in 1969.

=== Political career ===
Kaputin became an influential member and leader of the Mataungan Association in Rabaul. The association was a local Tolai grouping that was angered by the alienation of land by Germans and Australian plantation owners.

Armed with the leadership skills he had honed, he contested and easily won the 1972 General Elections and became the member for Rabaul Open for Papua New Guinea's National Parliament. Kaputin was appointed Minister of Finance under the Chan/Okuk Government in 1980. Whilst Minister for Finance, Kaputin was instrumental in crafting important legislation to establish Papua New Guinea's private company employees retirement fund, the National Provident Fund, which later became the National Superannuation Fund of Papua New Guinea NASFUND. Kwila Insurance was also introduced under Kaputin.

Kaputin was the foreign minister of Papua New Guinea from 1992 until 1994 and from December 1999 until 2000. He is a co-founder of the Melanesian Alliance Party. He was named Companion of the Order of St. Michael and St. George in 1983 and Knight Commander of the Order of the British Empire (KBE) in 1994 Birthday Honours List.

In March 2005, he took office as secretary-general of the African, Caribbean and Pacific Group of States, holding the position until 2010.

== Honors and awards ==
In December 2011, Kaputin, alongside Edward Laboran, became the inaugural inductees into the Papua New Guinea Olympic Committee Sporting Hall of Fame.
