= Francis Marus =

Papua New Guinea politician

Francis Marus (born 12 December 1969) is a Papua New Guinean politician. He has been a member of the National Parliament of Papua New Guinea since July 2007, representing the electorate of Talasea Open. He was Minister for Higher Education, Research, Science and Technology in the government of Peter O'Neill from July 2016. He was previously the Deputy Speaker of the National Parliament from 2007 to 2012. He has variously represented the Pangu Party (2007–2012), the Papua New Guinea Party (2012–2013), the United Resources Party (2013–2014) and the People's National Congress (2014–present).

== Early life and election to parliament ==
Marus was born in East Sepik, but was raised in West New Britain Province. He was educated at Galai Primary School and Hoskins High School before completing adult matriculation, and was a businessman before entering politics. He subsequently undertook an executive MBA at the University of Papua New Guinea, graduating in 2014.

Marus first contested the Talasea seat at the 2002 election, but was defeated by independent John Vulupundi, finishing third overall. He contested the seat again for the Pangu Party at the 2007 election, defeating Vulupindi on the second attempt, and was selected as Deputy Speaker the following year. In June 2010, criminal William Kapris accused Marus, Tony Aimo and Patrick Pruaitch of corruption, alleging that they benefited from his crimes. Marus declared his innocence and welcomed an investigation.

== Deputy Speaker and Acting Speaker ==
Marus was Acting Speaker through a difficult period in 2010 and 2011 involving a series of disputes around parliamentary process. In December 2010, the Supreme Court overturned the election of Paulias Matane as Governor-General and directed Marus to recall parliament within forty days. Marus launched an unsuccessful Supreme Court challenge to the decision, with the court ruling his application was "incompetent, unmeritorious and an abuse of process". The continued vacancy of the Governor-General at a time when the opposition was claiming the Prime Minister's position to be also vacant due to the absence of Michael Somare sparked what was referred to in some quarters as a "constitutional crisis".

Marus subsequently recalled parliament for the Governor-General vote, but declared that he would not entertain any other business at a time of moves to oust the government. The opposition was unable to reach Marus at his office, home or elsewhere and accused him of intentionally disappearing to prevent them giving him notice of a motion of no-confidence in the government. On 14 January 2011, Michael Ogio was appointed Governor-General, thus ending one stand-off; however, issues around the survival of the government remained.

In August 2011, Marus was one of the defectors from the government as Peter O'Neill ousted Somare as Prime Minister, with Speaker Nape presiding over parliament. In December 2011, with O'Neill and Somare still disputing who was validly Prime Minister, Nape became Acting Governor-General and Marus once again became Acting Speaker. In January 2012, he referred Somare to police over an incident where Somare and colleagues had entered parliament to physically present Marus with a court order reinstating Somare to office.

In May 2012, he made international news when he reportedly "stunned MPs" by ruling that, following the Supreme Court decision, that Somare had been the validly elected Prime Minister, but could not reassume the role as he had been disqualified from parliament for missing three sittings, thereby rendering the Prime Minister position vacant. He initially sought to stop an immediate new vote, declaring that both Somare and O'Neill were "at the root of the political crisis", but relented in the face of a dissent motion in his position, leading to O'Neill being re-elected in a 56–0 vote. In the same month, he crossed to the Papua New Guinea Party ahead of the 2012 election.

== Second term ==
Marus was re-elected at the 2012 election, defeating a challenge from former Police Commissioner Gari Baki. He was nominated for Speaker by his PNG Party but was defeated by Theo Zurenouc in a vote of 88 to 17. His party went into opposition, and he became Shadow Minister for Forestry, Climate Change and Environment and Conservation under Belden Namah. In May 2013, he crossed from the opposition to the government, joining the United Resources Party. In June 2014, he again changed parties, joining the People's National Congress. He was promoted to Minister for Higher Education, Research, Science and Technology in July 2016.

National Parliament of Papua New Guinea
Preceded by John Vulupindi	Member for Talasea Open; 2007–present	Incumbent
