= Anton Yagama =

The Honourable Anton Yagama MP

Member of the National Parliament of Papua New Guinea
- Incumbent
- Assumed office 3 August 2012
- Constituency: Usino-Bundi Open

Personal details
- Party: United Resources Party
- Occupation: Politician
- Profession: Farmer

Anton Yagama (born 31 December 1954) is a Papua New Guinean politician, who, since August 2012 has served as a Member of the National Parliament of Papua New Guinea representing Usino-Bundi Open for the United Resources Party.

== Life and education ==
Yagama completed his secondary education at St. Fidelis College in Kap, Madang Province. He completed a Bachelor of Economics at the University of Papua New Guinea. Yagama is a farmer by profession. From 1991 to 2011 was a member of the Church Council of the FourSquare Church.

== Political career ==
Abel was elected to represent Usino-Bundi Open at the 2012 general election as a candidate of the United Resources Party. Yagama currently serves as the Chair of Finance Parliamentary Referral Committee.
