= Davis Steven =

Papua New Guinea politician

The Honourable Davis Steven MP

Deputy Prime Minister of Papua New Guinea
- In office 7 June 2019 – 1 October 2020
- Prime Minister: James Marape
- Preceded by: Charles Abel
- Succeeded by: Sam Basil

Minister for Justice and Attorney General
- In office 2017 – 18 April 2019
- Prime Minister: Peter O'Neill

Minister for Civil Aviation
- In office 2012–2017
- Prime Minister: Peter O'Neill

Member of the National Parliament of Papua New Guinea
- Incumbent
- Assumed office 2012
- Constituency: Esa'ala Open

Personal details
- Party: Unaffiliated
- Other political affiliations: People's National Congress (2012–2019)
- Education: University of Papua New Guinea

Davis Madava Steven is a Papua New Guinea politician. He is a Member of the Papua New Guinea National Parliament, representing the seat of Esa'ala Open since 2012. Steven served as the Deputy Prime Minister of Papua New Guinea from 2019 to 2020 due to a cabinet reshuffle by prime minister Marape.

== Early life ==
Steven completed his secondary education at Wesley High School and Sogeri National High School. In 1990, he earned a bachelor's degree in law from the University of Papua New Guinea, and was admitted to the Bar at the Legal Training Institute in 1991. Prior to his election, he was a private practitioner with Stevens Lawyers.

== Political career ==
He was elected to the 9th National Parliament for the Esa'ala Open seat in the 2012 general elections, representing the People's Party. He was then appointed as Minister for Civil Aviation in the O'Neill-Dion cabinet. He was re-elected in the 2017 general elections, as a member of People's National Congress. He was appointed Minister of Justice and Attorney-General in the O'Neill-Abel Cabinet following the formation of Government in August 2017.

On 18 April 2019, he resigned as Minister for Justice and Attorney-General, and left People's National Congress.

On 7 June 2019, he was appointed and sworn in as Deputy Prime Minister of Papua New Guinea in the First Marape Cabinet, serving until 2020.
