= Benny Allan =

Papua New Guinean politician

Benny Allan (born 1 January 1958) is a Papua New Guinean politician. He has been a member of the National Parliament of Papua New Guinea since 2002, representing the electorate of Unggai-Bena Open, variously as an independent (2002) and for the United Resources Party (2002–2012) and People's National Congress (2012-present). He has been Minister for Lands and Physical Planning in the government of Peter O'Neill since August 2012. Allan previously served as Minister for Environment and Conservation under Michael Somare from 2007 to 2011.

== Biography ==
Allan was educated at Goroka High School, Lae Technical College and Goroka Teachers College. He was a high school teacher before leaving to work in the private sector, managing liquor distribution company Negiso Distributors. He was elected to the National Parliament as an independent at the 2002 election, after which he joined the United Resources Party. He served in the opposition shadow ministry under Mekere Morauta from February until May 2005 when he crossed over to the government, becoming a parliamentary secretary in June 2005.

He was re-elected at the 2007 election as a URP candidate, after which he was appointed Minister for Environment and Conservation by Prime Minister Michael Somare. Allan was an advocate for addressing climate change in this capacity, telling the United States at the 2007 United Nations Climate Change Conference "if for some reason you are not willing to lead, leave it to the rest of us and please get out of the way". In February 2008, he stated that three foreign firms had attempted to bribe him with free travel in order to fast-track approvals for their investments. In April 2008, he announced that no further exploration licenses along the historically sensitive Kokoda Track would be approved while the Somare government was in power.

In April 2009, he proposed a national ban on the use of plastic bags. In April 2010, Allan defended controversial laws which sought to protect development projects from delays caused by environmental challenges by preventing departmental approvals from being challenged in court, which had been criticised by some lawyers and human rights organisations as "draconian". In May 2011, in his electorate capacity, he advocated for a total ban on liquor sales in the Eastern Highlands Province. In May 2011, he was one of several government ministers to switch to the opposition and bring down the Somare government, resulting in the election of Opposition Leader Peter O'Neill as Prime Minister.

Allan was re-elected for the People's National Congress at the 2012 election, having crossed to the new governing party led by O'Neill. He was subsequently appointed Minister for Lands and Physical Planning in O'Neill's post-election reshuffle. He faced significant ongoing concerns in this role around corruption in relation to the distribution of land titles. In October 2012, he moved to have the Lands Department collect more than K94 million (US$45 million) in unpaid state land rents.

In March 2013, he announced an investigation into land deals alleged to have been fraudulently acquired across the country. Under Allan, the department subsequently undertook an audit of the extent of land that is under state lease and land under customary tenure in the National Capital District, with the intent to do the same nationally, in order to settle widespread confusion about legal land ownership. In October 2013, he proposed restricting land ownership to Papua New Guineans, with foreign investors to be required to partner with local entrepreneurs. In March 2017, he refused to revoke a subset of leases that had previously been found to be largely fraudulently obtained, and in the face of public controversy resolved to instead convert them to registered land.

National Parliament of Papua New Guinea
Preceded by Damson Lafana	Member for Unggai-Bena Open; 2002–present	Incumbent
