= Bryan Kramer =

American businessman

Bryan Jeffrey Kramer
- Occupations: CEO, entrepreneur, author
- Known for: PureMatter
- Notable work: There Is No B2B or B2C: It's Human to Human #H2H, Shareology: How Sharing is Powering the Human Economy

Bryan Jeffrey Kramer is an American businessman, author, and publish speaker. He is the co-founder and CEO of the social media marketing agency PureMatter and the author of two books.

== Career ==
Kramer started his advertising career in San Jose at a boutique advertising firm named Carter Waxman's Advertising and PR. He worked for SK Consulting as a management consultant.

=== PureMatter ===
Kramer founded PureMatter in 2001. Kramer, with his team, developed what he called "The Shareability Quotient". It attempts to make "shareability" calculable by stating that the likelihood of a share ≥ perceived reputation of content or source. He has been noted for his TED Talk titled "Why Sharing is Reimagining our Future."

In 2008, PureMatter was recognized by the Silicon Valley Business Journal as one of Silicon Valley's fastest-growing private companies. Kramer's area of expertise is social media marketing with a focus on human-to-human communication.

=== Published Works ===
Kramer has authored two books. His first book is There Is No B2B or B2C: It's Human to Human #H2H, which argues that modern marketing techniques need to be adjusted to cater to modern social media users. It argues that a simple message is the best way to stand out among other advertisers. Furthermore, the book argues the benefits of cultivating a personal brand over a business brand. Kramer asserts that "human-to-human" communications are more engaging to modern consumers than "business speak."

His other book, Shareology, How Sharing is Powering the Human Economy, examines the human nature of communication, studies how it evolved, suggests methods of communication, and attempts to predict future trends of sharing. During the process of writing this book, Kramer interviewed more than 250 professionals from different fields, including marketers, professors, and social media experts, about the concept of sharing.

Shareology was released in July 2014 by Morgan James Publishing. Around 15,000 copies were sold in its first month. The book has been translated into Chinese and Russian.

== Books ==
- There Is No B2B or B2C: It's Human to Human #H2H
- Shareology: How Sharing is Powering the Human Economy
