= Jelta Wong =

Papua New Guinean politician

The Honourable Jelta Wong MP
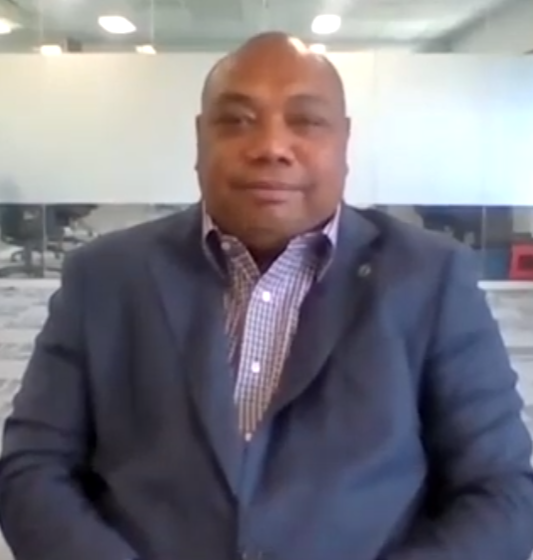
- In a Lowy Institute online discussion in 2021

Member of Parliament for Gazelle Open

National Parliament of Papua New Guinea
- Incumbent
- Assumed office 2017
- Monarch: Elizabeth II
- Governor-General: Sir Bob Dadae
- Prime Minister: James Marape

Minister for Health & HIV/AIDS
- Incumbent
- Assumed office 20 December 2020
- Prime Minister: James Marape

Minister for Civil Aviation
- In office 1 October 2020 – 19 December 2020

caretaker Minister for State Enterprises
- In office 16 November 2020 – 19 December 2020

Minister for Health & HIV/AIDS
- In office 8 November 2019 – 30 September 2020
- Prime Minister: James Marape

Minister for Police
- In office August 2017 – April 2019
- Prime Minister: Peter O'Neill

Personal details
- Party: United Resources Party (URP)
- Profession: Occupation Prior to Elections: Business man in Lae (2004-2007) and Kokopo (2007-2017)
- Website: http://www.parliament.gov.pg/index.php/tenth-parliament/bio/view/gazelle-district

Jelta Wong is a Papua New Guinean politician.Mr Wong has some Chinese heritage. He was first elected to the 10th National Parliament for the Gazelle Open seat in the 2017 General Elections as a United Resource Party candidate. He has been appointed as Minister for Health and HIV/AIDS in two separate terms both under Prime Minister James Marape, after being Minister for Police under Prime Minister Peter O'Neill.
