= Social Democratic Party (Papua New Guinea) =

- Leader: Powes Parkop
- President: Wesley Sanarup
- Secretary: Justin Yatu
- Founded: June 2010
- Ideology: Social democracy
- Political position: Centre-left
- National Parliament: 4 / 118

Website
- Facebook page

The Social Democratic Party is a political party in Papua New Guinea. It was founded in June 2010 by Port Moresby Governor Powes Parkop.

It won three seats at the 2012 election: Parkop (National Capital District Provincial), Justin Tkatchenko (Moresby South Open) and Joseph Yopyyopy (Wosera-Gawi). It supported the government of Prime Minister Peter O'Neill, and Tkatchenko was appointed as Minister for Sport. Yopyyopy later defected to the United Resources Party, while Tkatchenko joined the People's National Congress.

As of June 2023, the party has 4 seats in the National Parliament.

== Electoral results ==
National Parliament
Election	Leader	Votes	%	Seats	+/–
2012	Powes Parkop	No data		3 / 111	New
2017	Powes Parkop	129,266	1.64% (#10)	2 / 111	▼1
2022	Powes Parkop	No data		4 / 118	▲2
