= Department of Finance (Papua New Guinea) =

Government ministry of Papua New Guinea

Papua New Guinea's Department of Finance is responsible for the "protection of public money" in Papua New Guinea (PNG). It aims to improve "the transparency and accountability of the accounting and financial reporting and their frameworks" in the country. The department is led by a Minister of Finance. The headquarters of the department are at Vulupindi Haus, Waigani.

== Ministers of Finance ==
- Julius Chan, 1972–1977
- Barry Holloway, 1977–1980
- John Kaputin, 1980–1982
- Philip Bouraga, 1982–1985
- Julius Chan, 1985–1986
- Geleva Kwarara, 1987–1988
- Paul Pora, 1988–1992
- Julius Chan, 1992–1994
- Christopher Seseve Haiveta, 1994–1997
- Roy Yaki, 1997
- Iairo Lasaro, 1997
- Dibara Yagabo, 1997–1998
- Jacob Klewaki Wama, 1998–1999
- Mekere Morauta, 1999–2000
- Andrew Kumbakor, 2000–2002
- Bart Philemon, 2002–2006
- Patrick Pruaitch, 2006
- John Tongri Hickey, 2006–2007
- Patrick Pruaitch, 2007–2010
- Peter O'Neill, 2010–2011
- Don Polye, 2011–2012
- Peter O'Neill, 2012
- James Marape, 2012–2019
- Sam Basil, 2019
- Richard Maru, 2019
- Charles Abel, 2019
- Renbo Paita, 2019–2020
- John Pundari, 2020–2021
- Renbo Paita, 2021–2022
- Ian Ling-Stuckey, acting, 2022-2023
- Renbo Paita, 2023-2024
- Ian Ling-Stuckey, acting, 2024
- Yangakun Miki Kaeok, 2024-2025
- Thomas Opa, 2025-

== Controversies ==
=== The Paraka Scam ===
For the past six years, the Department of Finance has been embroiled in a multimillion-dollar corruption scandal surrounding former finance secretary Gabriel Yer and PNG lawyer Paul Paraka.

In 2006, it came to light that between 2001 and 2006, Yer and several senior officials had been making false compensation claims of up to PGK780 million against the state. 700 claims were made by lawyers against the state and approved by the solicitor general and the finance secretary without being tested in court.

Yer made a claim in the name of his son for the sum of PGK700,000 through his lawyer, Paraka, which was paid in full. Pakara profited from the scheme by making three of the largest fraudulent claims. In addition, he was hired by the state and paid PGK41 million between 2003 and 2006 to act on the state's behalf for claims made through other law firms.

=== Commission of Inquiry ===
Following the revelation of the scam, a Commission of Inquiry was established by former Prime Minister of PNG Sir Michael Somare. The Commission, led by Justices Maurice Sheehan, Cathy Davani and Don Manoa, was tasked with investigating the claims, establishing their legitimacy, the amounts illegally paid and to establish the roles of the solicitor general and the minister of finance, amongst other civil servants.

The Commission was suspended and restarted five times between September 2006 and September 2008 due to issues over financing. The Commission's 812-page report was published in October 2009 and presented to parliament in February 2010.

At its tabling in Parliament, Somare commented that "people who read it, would shudder in awe" at the level of corruption in the finance department.

=== Findings and response ===
The Commission's report was broadly damning and stated, "The plain conclusion is that in all but a handful of claims the statutory process has been grossly abused, allowing illegitimate and improper claims and excess payments and excessive payouts to be legitimized."

The report made 75 recommendations, including referring the matter to the police and the Ombudsman Commission for further investigation. It also recommended the criminal prosecution of 58 people.

Upon completion of the report, Paraka secured an injunction halting broader publication of the report. In defiance of the injunction, a blogger published the entire report in May 2010. injunction remains in place today.

Despite the Commission's decisive findings, little has been done by the government in response. No charges have been laid against the individuals named in the report and although Gabriel Yer was dismissed in mid-2011, he was reinstated to the position of finance secretary in December 2011.

=== Somare's Appointment of O'Neill ===
In July 2010, Somare appointed MP Peter O'Neill as Treasury and Minister of Finance. According to PNG media sources, the appointment was seen as a "disaster". O'Neill, the current Prime Minister of PNG, was allegedly involved in the National Provident Fund (NPF) Tower fraud, in 1999, in which millions of Kinas were stolen from the retirement savings of ordinary PNG citizens.

There was a Commission of Inquiry into the NPF, which concluded in 2002 that O'Neill "definitely benefited from proceeds of the NPF Tower Fraud".

The commission recommended that O'Neill and other members of parliament should be prosecuted for stealing, amongst other offences; however O'Neill was never charged.

== 2021 ransomware ==
The department suffered a ransomware attack that locked hundreds of millions of dollars.
