= Pila Niningi =

Papua New Guinea politician

The Honourable Pila Niningi CMG MP
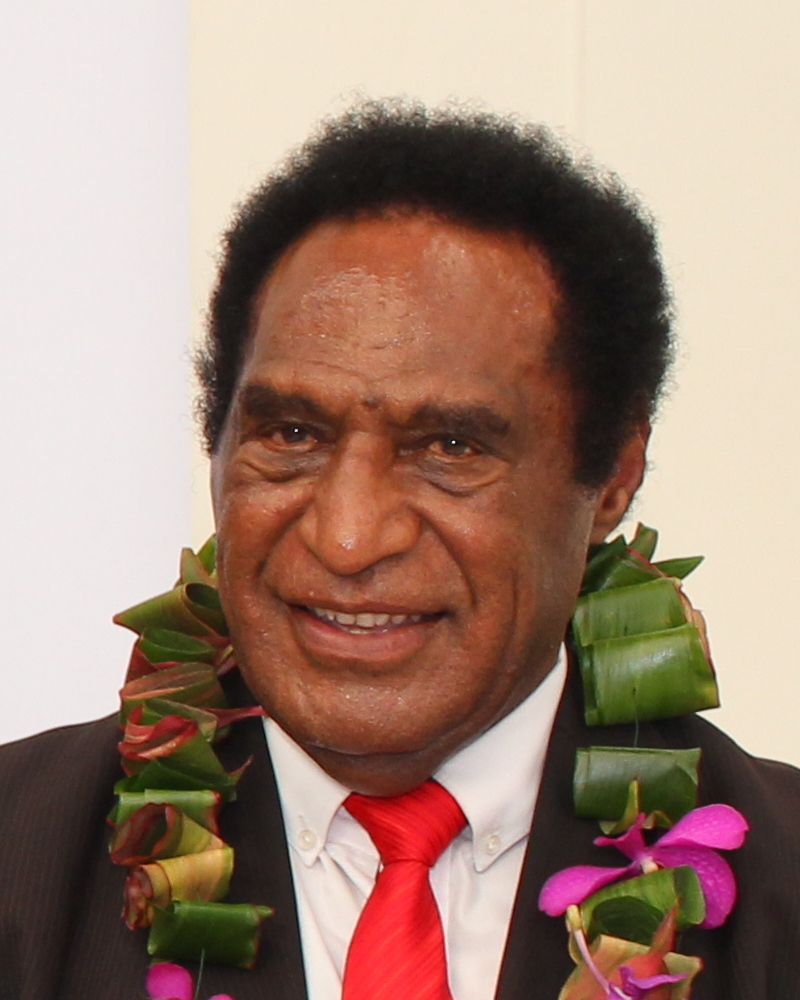
- Niningi in 2018

Minister for Inter-Government Relations
- Incumbent
- Assumed office 7 June 2019
- Prime Minister: James Marape

Minister for Higher Education, Research, Science and Technology
- In office 9 August 2017 – 31 May 2019
- Prime Minister: Peter O'Neill
- Succeeded by: Pila Niningi

Member of the National Parliament of Papua New Guinea
- Incumbent
- Assumed office 2017
- Constituency: Imbonggu Open

Minister for Public Services
- In office 21 October 1998 – 28 October 1998
- Prime Minister: Bill Skate

Member of the National Parliament of Papua New Guinea
- In office 1997 – 28 October 1998
- Preceded by: Peter Peipul
- Succeeded by: Peter Peipul
- Constituency: Imbonggu Open

Personal details
- Party: Pangu Pati
- Other political affiliations: Independent
- Education: University of Papua New Guinea

Pila Kole Niningi is a Papua New Guinea politician. He is a Member of the National Parliament of Papua New Guinea, and represented the seat of Imbonggu Open from 1997 to 1998 and was re-elected to the seat in 2017.

== Early life ==
Niningi graduated from the University of Papua New Guinea with a Bachelor of Laws.

== Political career ==
Niningi was first elected to the National Parliament in the 1997 general election. He was declared the winner of the seat on 14 August 1998 following a recount which was ordered by the Court of Disputed Returns. He was appointed as Minister for Public Services in October 1998 under Bill Skate, but was disqualified from Parliament by a Supreme Court decision on 28 October 1998.

Niningi was later re-elected to the National Parliament in the 2017 general election as an Independent. He was appointed as Minister for Higher Education, Research, Science and Technology in the O'Neill-Abel Cabinet. He was then appointed as Minister for Inter-Government Relations on 7 June 2019 as part of the First Marape Cabinet.

== Honours ==
Niningi was appointed as a Companion of the Order of St Michael and St George in the 2025 New Year Honours for his political service and for his service to the legal profession in Papua New Guinea.
