= William Samb =

Papua New Guinean politician (died 2022)

Minister for Commerce and Industry
- In office 10 January 2022 – 3 March 2022
- Preceded by: Sam Basil

Minister for Transport and Infrastructure
- In office 7 June 2019 – 10 January 2022
- Preceded by: Wesley Nukundj
- Succeeded by: Sam Basil

Member of the National Parliament of Papua New Guinea
- In office August 2015 – 3 March 2022

Personal details
- Died: 3 March 2022 Dubai, United Arab Emirates
- Party: Pangu Party
- Education: Papua New Guinea University of Technology; Queensland University of Technology

William Samb (died 3 March 2022) was a Papua New Guinean politician.

== Biography ==
He was a part of the Goilalan people of southeastern Papua New Guinea and was among the first of his people to obtain higher education, attending the Papua New Guinea University of Technology in Lae. He earned a master's degree in project management from the Queensland University of Technology in Australia in 2012. He then began working as a public employee in public works, serving as a road project implementation manager prior to entering politics.

In August 2015, Samb was elected to the National Parliament of Papua New Guinea in a by-election due to the death of MP Daniel Mona. A member of the Pangu Party, he was re-elected in 2017 and became Minister Assistant to Prime Minister Peter O'Neill. He resigned from this position in April 2019 and joined the opposition. This allowed James Marape to become Prime Minister, who appointed Samb as Minister for Transport and Infrastructure.

In January 2022, Samb was appointed Minister for Commerce and Industry in the midst of a ministerial reshuffle. While participating in a trade exhibition in Dubai, he was hospitalized with high blood pressure and died on 3 March 2022.
