= Belden Namah =

Deputy Prime Minister of Papua New Guinea

Belden Namah MP
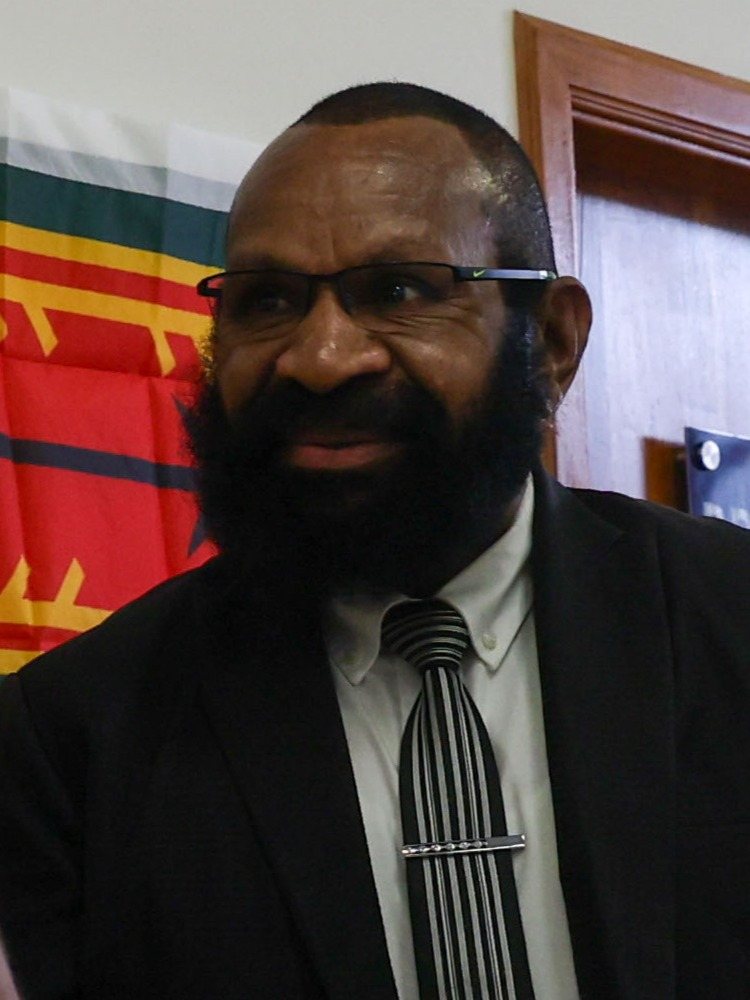

Leader of the Opposition
- In office September 2019 – December 2020
- Preceded by: Patrick Pruaitch
- Succeeded by: Patrick Pruaitch
- In office August 2012 – December 2014
- Preceded by: Carol Kidu
- Succeeded by: Don Polye
- In office 2011 – July 2011
- Preceded by: Mekere Morauta
- Succeeded by: Carol Kidu

Deputy Prime Minister of Papua New Guinea
- In office 2011–2012
- Prime Minister: Peter O'Neill
- Preceded by: Sam Abal
- Succeeded by: Leo Dion

Minister for Forestry
- In office 2007–2010
- Prime Minister: Michael Somare

Member of the National Parliament of Papua New Guinea
- Incumbent
- Assumed office 2007
- Constituency: Vanimo-Green River Open

Personal details
- Born: 30 December 1969 (age 56)
- Party: Papua New Guinea Party (2012–)
- Other political affiliations: National Alliance Party (2007-2010)
- Education: Duntroon

Belden Namah (born 30 December 1969) is a Papua New Guinean politician. Namah is a member of the National Parliament for the Papua New Guinea Party, and has represented Vanimo-Green River District since 2007. He served in the Cabinet from 2007 to 2010, and as Deputy Prime Minister from 2011 to 2012. In 2012, Namah became a member of the opposition. After retaining his seat in the 2022 election, he said that he would not rejoin the opposition.

== Military career ==
Namah is from Vanimo, near Papua New Guinea's border with Indonesia. He joined the military, graduated from Australia's Royal Military College in Duntroon, and was trained for a special-forces unit (SFU). During the Sandline affair, Namah was one of five PNG Defence Force (PNGDF) officers who arrested Sandline International founder Tim Spicer. Sandline had been hired by the PNG government to recapture the Panguna mine on Bougainville Island and end an insurrection there. The SFU, under the direction of PNGDF commander Jerry Singirok, took the Sandline contractors hostage and announced the cancellation of their contract. Namah and his fellow officers were convicted of mutiny.

== Parliamentary career ==
In 2007, Namah entered Parliament as a member of the National Alliance Party and became Minister of Forestry and Natural Resources in the Michael Somare-Puka Temu cabinet. In 2010, he resigned from the cabinet and joined Mekere Morauta and the Papua New Guinea Party. Namah became part of the opposition leading to the overthrow of the Somare government, and was Deputy Prime Minister and Minister of Forestry and National Resources in Peter O'Neill's cabinet during the 2011–2012 constitutional crisis. Retaining his seat in 2012, 2017 and 2022 elections, he lost his cabinet post after the 2012 election and was opposition leader from 2012 to 2014.

After Namah was deposed as leader of the opposition in 2014, he tried to become governor of Sandaun Province (his home province). The post was vacant because the election of Amkat Mai was nullified, and it could be filled by another MP in the province. Namah became interim governor, mobilising support from local politicians which was challenged by the provincial administration, and withdrew from an April 2015 by-election for governor. Amkat Mai's appeal against disqualification was successful and he was returned as Governor. In April 2018, Namah was dismissed from office by the Leadership Tribunal. Namah was readmitted to Parliament in July 2018.

Namah became de facto leader of the opposition, where he led two initiatives to seize power. He challenged the succession of Peter O'Neill by James Marape in court (which he lost), and led a campaign for a vote of no confidence to replace Marape with Patrick Pruaitch. This attempt also failed after the opposition split between Pruaitch and Sam Basil. Basil's supporters returned to government with Pruaitch, but Namath remained in the opposition. Namah again attempted to generate a vote of no confidence and backed O'Neill as prime minister. In 2022, Namah announced he would leave the opposition and join the government. He was appointed in September 2022 as Chairman of the Foreign Affairs and Defence Parliament Committee.

=== Court cases ===
In 2015, the Papua New Guinea Post-Courier reported that sixteen charges of misconduct had been brought against Namah by the Ombudsman Commission. In May 2012, Namah stormed into the Supreme Court, accused Chief Justice Salomo Injia of sedition, and demanded his resignation. The court had upheld a December 2011 ruling that the O'Neill-Namah government was illegal, and the incident was referred to the Ombudsman Commission as misconduct in office. Namah apologised soon afterwards to former Prime Minister Michael Somare and Injia for his behaviour during the 2011-2012 parliamentary crisis. After several delays, a Leadership Tribunal recommended Namah's removal from office.

Namah was referred by the prosecutor to a Leadership Tribunal in October 2016, four-and-a-half years after the events took place, and was suspended from his post. The tribunal reached a decision in April 2018, and recommended his dismissal from office. Namah asked for a judicial review of his dismissal and called the ruling a miscarriage of justice; of several MPs involved in storming the Supreme Court, Namah was the only one prosecuted. In September 2020, the Supreme Court dismissed an application for an injunction against a 16 July National Court ruling which favoured Namah. Although Namah's challenge to the 2019 appointment of James Marape was rejected by the Supreme Court the following year, he was again recognised as leader of the opposition.

=== Ethical issues ===
Namah said that Prime Minister Peter O'Neill was disqualified from also being the acting Minister of Police. O'Neill asked authorities to investigate how Namah obtained K50 million in 2012 campaign spending.

Namah was reportedly ejected from a Sydney casino in because of misbehaviour, but was readmitted because he was a high roller. Police requested an interview with him in June 2013 about the possible misappropriation of A$4.6 million meant for a road project in West Sepik, but Namah denied the allegation.

== Political views ==
When Namah became deputy prime minister in 2011, he said that any government he might lead would aim to provide free universal education and healthcare, and to "fix the law and order problem in this country". Prospective university students would serve two years in the military, and Papua New Guinean scientists working on climate change would be supported.

During the run-up to the 2022 election, Namah advocated privatising state enterprises. Saying that the PNG economy was import-driven, he wanted to make it an export-driven economy.

== Personal life ==
Namah, a Seventh Day Adventist, is married with children.
