= People's First Party (Papua New Guinea) =

People First Party
- Leader: Richard Maru
- President: Jack Masenu
- Secretary: Peter Honale
- Founder: Luther Wenge
- Founded: August 2001
- National Parliament: 4 / 118

Website
- peoplefirstpati.com

The People's First Party (also known as the People First Party, Pipol First Party or Pipol's First Party) is a political party in Papua New Guinea.

It was established in August 2001 by Morobe Province governor Luther Wenge. Wenge was re-elected at the 2002 election and Tom Amukele elected for Okapa Open. Amukele attempted to defect to the governing National Alliance Party of Michael Somare, resulting in protests from Wenge; however, this did not occur after Wenge agreed to support Somare. In September 2002, the party won a Supreme Court declaration that legislation introducing a value added tax was unconstitutional. A reported merger with the United Party in October 2002 did not proceed, with the party reported to still have two MPs at that time: Wenge and Amukele.

In March 2004, Wenge called for the resignation of Somare, alleging mishandling of the nation's affairs, and stated that he was willing to become prime minister. However, the party continued to support the Somare government in parliament. Wenge was the party's only MP to be elected at the 2007 election. Wenge claimed, following the declaration of his seat in a close race against businessman Bob Sinclair, that he would introduce a law to restrict naturalised citizens from contesting elections because Papua New Guinea was "a black country and not white country".

Wenge lost his seat at the 2012 election, and the party did not have parliamentary representation again until 2022.

The party was registered to contest the 2017 election.

At the 2022 election the party gained 4 seats in the 113-seat Parliament.
