= Luther Wenge =

Papua New Guinean politician (1959–2025)

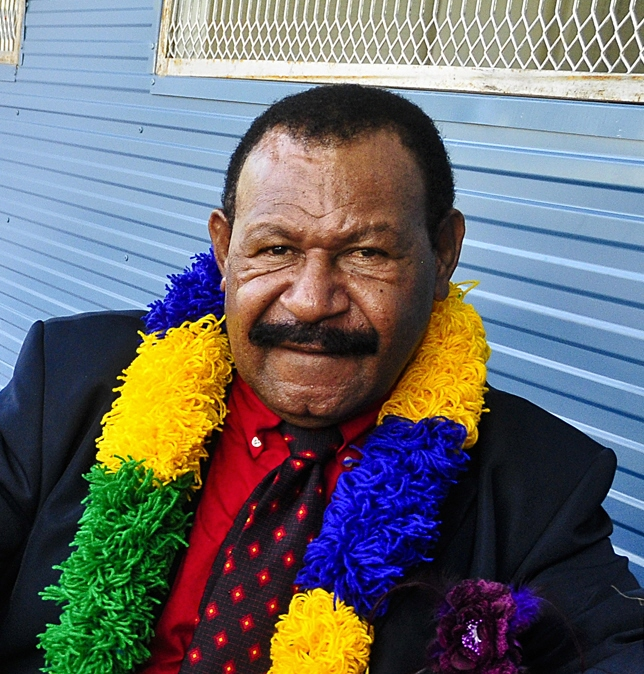

Governor of Morobe Province
- In office 2022 – 13 September 2025
- Prime Minister: James Marape
- Preceded by: Ginson Saonu

Personal details
- Born: Luther Akisawa Wenge; 12 December 1959
- Died: 13 September 2025 (aged 65)
- Party: People's Labour Party
- Other political affiliations: Pipol First Party

Luther Akisawa Wenge (12 December 1959 – 13 September 2025) was a Papua New Guinean politician. He was Governor of Morobe Province and a member of the National Parliament of Papua New Guinea as a member of the Pipol First Party from 1997 to 2012. After 10 years, he reclaimed his old Parliamentary seat in the 2022 National Elections this time under the People's Labour Party.

== Life and career ==
Wenge worked as a lawyer and magistrate before entering politics. He was first elected to the National Parliament in the 1997 election. He was defeated by Kelly Naru at the 2012 election. Wenge defeated Ginson Goheyu Saonu at the 2022 National Elections to reclaim office.

One of his brothers, Kennedy Wenge, was also a member of the National Parliament, while another brother, Giegere Wenge, was the head bishop of the Evangelical Lutheran Church of Papua New Guinea.

Wenge died on 13 September 2025, at the age of 65.
