= Richard Maru =

Papua New Guinean politician

The Honourable Richard Maru OBE MP
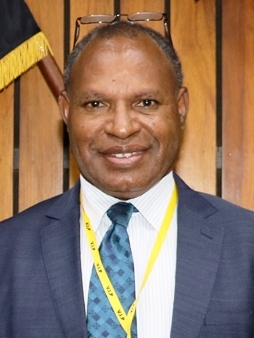
- Maru in 2017

Minister for International Trade and Investment
- Incumbent
- Assumed office 24 August 2022
- Prime Minister: James Marape

Minister for Finance and Rural Development
- In office 13 May 2019 – 7 June 2019
- Prime Minister: Peter O'Neill
- Preceded by: Sam Basil
- Succeeded by: Charles Abel

Minister for National Planning and Monitoring
- In office 2017 – 13 May 2019
- Prime Minister: Peter O'Neill
- In office 7 June 2019 – 27 August 2019
- Prime Minister: James Marape

Minister for Trade, Commerce and Industry
- In office 2012–2017
- Prime Minister: Peter O'Neill

Member of the National Parliament of Papua New Guinea
- Incumbent
- Assumed office 2012
- Constituency: Yangoru Saussia Open

Personal details
- Party: People's First Party (2020–)
- Other political affiliations: People's National Congress (2012–2020); Independent (2012)
- Education: Papua New Guinea University of Technology
- Website: richardmaru.org

Richard Maru OBE is a Papua New Guinea politician. He is a Member of the National Parliament of Papua New Guinea representing Yangoru Saussia Open, and is the leader of People's First Party. He was appointed as Minister for International Trade and Investment in 2022.

In 2011, he was appointed an OBE for services to development banking and rural development, and an active member of the Association of Development Financing Institutions in Asia and the Pacific.

== Early life ==
Maru graduated from the Papua New Guinea University of Technology in 1983 with a Bachelor of Technology in Business Studies Degree. He completed an MBA from the University of Bath in 1999.

== Political career ==
Maru was first elected to the National Parliament in the 2012 election as an independent candidate. He was then appointed as Minister for Trade, Commerce and Industry in the O'Neill-Dion cabinet.

He was re-elected in the 2017 election, representing People's National Congress. He was then appointed Minister for National Planning and Monitoring.

He was appointed as Minister for Finance and Rural Development on 13 May 2019 until 7 June 2019.

As of 2022, he is the leader of the People's First Party.
