= United Labour Party (Papua New Guinea) =

- President: Sir Bob Sinclair
- Secretary: Varigini Badira
- Founder: Sam Basil
- Founded: 2019
- Ideology: Labourism
- National Parliament: 3 / 118

The United Labour Party is a political party in Papua New Guinea founded in 2019. Like other Labour parties around the world, it is closely linked to the trade union movement, and presents itself as defending the interests of workers. They have 8 seats in the National Parliament of Papua New Guinea. The party's founder, Sam Basil, was killed in a car crash just before the 2022 Papua New Guinean general election.

== Electoral results ==
Results
Election	Seats
2022	3
