= Allegiance Party (Papua New Guinea) =

Papua New Guinean political party

- Leader: Bryan Kramer
- President: Ila Geno
- Founder: Bryan Kramer
- Founded: May 2018
- Membership (2018): 9,000
- Ideology: Anti-corruption
- Colours: Blue; Red
- Slogan: "Loyalty to God and Country"
- National Parliament: 1 / 118

Website
- allegiancepartypng.com

The Allegiance Party is a political party in Papua New Guinea. It was founded in May 2018 by Bryan Kramer, the Member for Madang. He is the only Member of the National Parliament for the Party. The party has a strong anti-corruption focus; the motto is "Loyalty to God and Country."

On its launch, Kramer claimed to have attracted almost 9,000 members, an unusually large number for Papua New Guinea political parties that have been slow to draw on a public support base. However, a lack of subsequent activity and updates suggests much of this membership may have lapsed or be non-financial.

Notable supporters of and advisors to the party include party President Chief Ila Geno, former Chief Ombudsman, Public Service Commission chairman and Police Commissioner.

The Allegiance Party ran its first candidate, Sir Arnold Amet, in the Moresby North-West Open byelection in June 2021. He was not successful in securing the seat, which was won by Pangu Party.
