= Our Development Party =

- Leader: Charles Abel
- President: Andrew Terry
- Secretary: Habia Babe
- Founder: Puka Temu and Andy Kenemu
- National Parliament: 1 / 118

The Our Development Party is a political party in Papua New Guinea.

The party was co-founded in 2011, after the O'Neill Government ousted the Somare Government, by Sir Puka Temu and Andy Kenemu. At the time, it had 25 members in the National Parliament.

In the 2017 elections, the party won two seats, held by Francis Maneke and Temu. Both MPs left the party during the parliamentary term.

As of May 2019, the party had 2 seats in the National Parliament. It is led by Temu, who is its sole MP. Temu returned to the party on 15 May 2019 after leaving People's National Congress.

On 31 May 2019, former Deputy Prime Minister Charles Abel resigned from People‘s National Congress to join the party.
