= Melanesian Liberal Party =

- Leader: Allan Marat
- President: Levi Benson ToViliran
- Secretary: Kepas Paon
- Ideology: Liberalism
- National Parliament: 1 / 111

The Melanesian Liberal Party is a political party in Papua New Guinea.

The party won 2 out of 109 seats in the 2007 General Election. Following the 2007 Election, it initially supported Prime Minister Michael Somare's government, as Party leader Allan Marat was appointed Attorney-General and Justice Minister. In May 2010, however, Marat publicly criticised aspects of government policy, and resigned upon being asked to do so by the Prime Minister. He informed Somare that the MLP would no longer be supporting the government.

It returned two MPs at the 2012 General Election: Rabaul Open MP Marat and Gazelle Open MP Malakai Tabar. Tabar subsequently crossed to the National Alliance Party, leaving Marat as their sole MP.

As of May 2019, the party had one seat in the National Parliament.
