= Don Polye =

Papua New Guinean politician

Hon. Don Polye MP
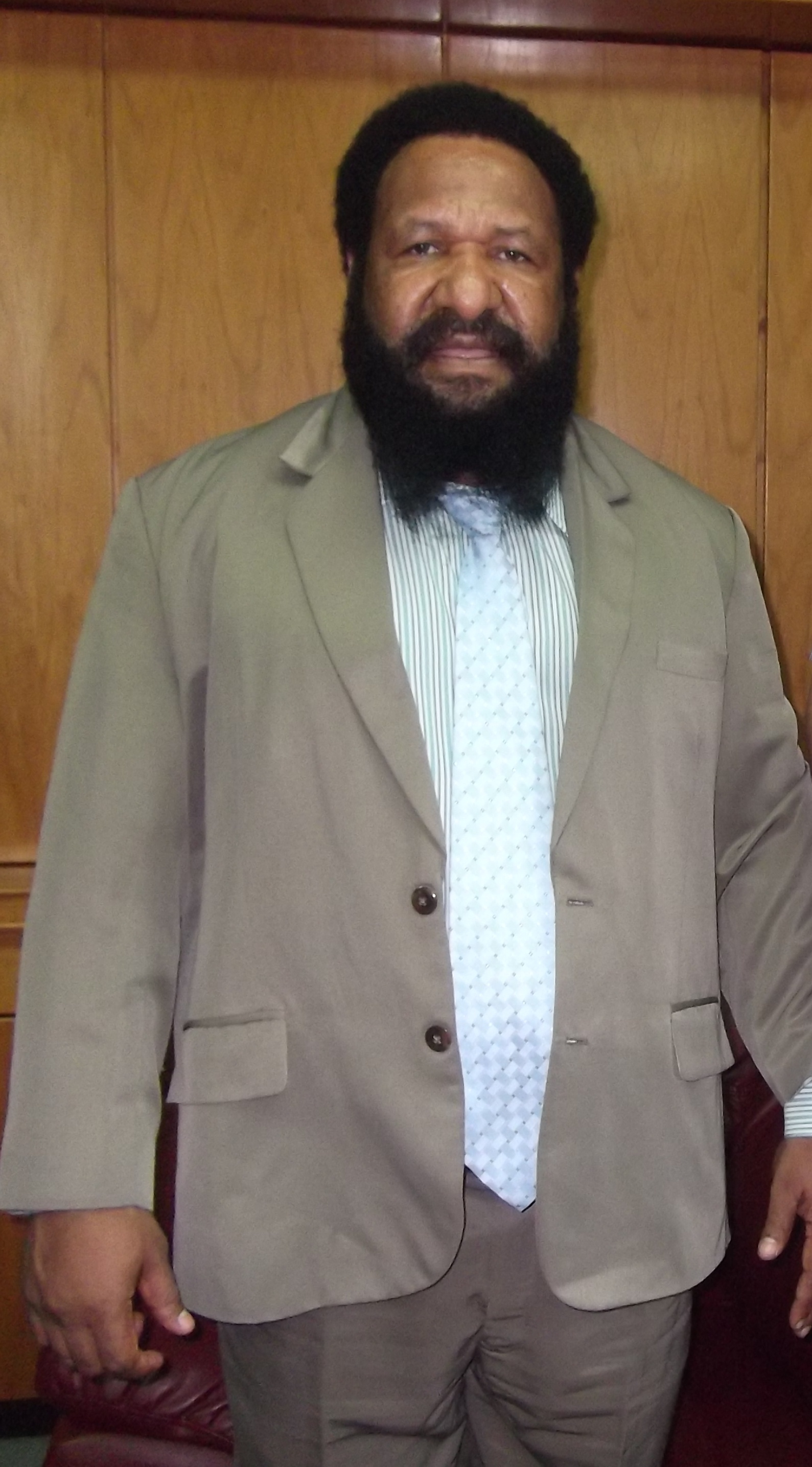

Leader of the Opposition of Papua New Guinea
- In office May 2016 – August 2017
- Preceded by: Sam Basil
- Succeeded by: Patrick Pruaitch
- In office December 2014 – May 2016
- Preceded by: Belden Namah
- Succeeded by: Sam Basil

Leader of Triumph Heritage Empowerment Party
- Incumbent
- Assumed office 2012

Deputy Prime Minister of Papua New Guinea
- In office 2010–2010
- Preceded by: Puka Temu
- Succeeded by: Sam Abal

Member of National Parliament for Kandep Open
- Incumbent
- Assumed office 9 November 2009
- Preceded by: Don Polye

Deputy Prime Minister of Papua New Guinea
- In office 2006–2007
- Preceded by: Moi Avei
- Succeeded by: Puka Temu

Member of National Parliament for Kandep Open
- In office 2002 – 14 August 2009
- Preceded by: Jimson Sauk
- Succeeded by: Don Polye

Personal details
- Born: 1 February 1967 (age 59) Enga Province
- Party: Triumph Heritage Empowerment Party (2012–present); National Alliance Party (2002-2012) Mt. Hagen High School Avi Community School
- Education: Passam National High School
- Alma mater: Southern Cross University (2004-2007); Lae University of Technology (1987-1990)

Don Pomb Polye (born 1 February 1967) is a Papua New Guinean politician from Enga Province. He has been a Cabinet Minister under two Prime Ministers, and was briefly Deputy Prime Minister from July to December 2010. He has held Foreign Affairs, Immigration, Transport, Civil Aviation, Finance and Treasury portfolios.

== Political career ==
Polye was first elected in 2002 to the National Parliament of Papua New Guinea representing the Kandep Open electorate as a member of the National Alliance Party. He was the Minister for Transport and Civil Aviation from July 2006 to August 2009. Sir Michael Somare, the Prime Minister, appointed Polye to that position in July 2006 as part of a Cabinet reshuffle. He was also Deputy Prime Minister from July 2006 until August 2007. As Minister for Civil Aviation he introduced an "open air" policy ensuring that Air Niugini faced competition from other airlines starting from 2007.

Polye was rushed from a political rally in his Kandep electorate in June 2007 after shots were fired. A rival candidate for his seat was later charged with attempted murder.

Polye was removed from his position as Member of Parliament on 14 August 2009 when the National Court determined that his victory in the 2007 General Election was invalid. The judge's ruling included the observation that it was hard to believe that some polling stations had returned a 100% vote for Polye. The by-election for the seat took place on 9 November 2009, and Polye ran as a candidate. He was successful in regaining his seat.

In July 2010, he replaced Puka Temu as deputy Prime Minister, when the latter tried unsuccessfully to unseat Prime Minister Somare through a parliamentary motion of no confidence. Polye himself was removed as Deputy Prime Minister on 7 December 2010, in an impromptu cabinet reshuffle conducted under what Australia's ABC News called "unusual circumstances". However he was appointed as Papua New Guinea's Foreign Minister later in December 2010, holding that position until another cabinet reshuffle in June 2011. He supported the Opposition when it brought down the government through a parliamentary motion of no confidence in August 2011, and was appointed Minister of Finance by new Prime Minister Peter O'Neill.

In October, the National Alliance Party consequently sought to expel him from the party, but was prevented from doing so by a court order. Later that month, it was reported simultaneously that Polye, along with many others, had been expelled from the party "for conduct prejudicial to the interest of the party", and that he had been elected as party leader. In fact, the party split into factions, one of which was led by Polye. In January 2012, he announced that he was de-registering the National Alliance Party, despite the existence of a rival faction claiming to be the legitimate party. Polye and his faction launched a new party, the Triumph Heritage Empowerment Rural Party ("T.H.E. Party"), ahead of the June 2012 general election.

On 27 February 2012, Prime Minister Peter O'Neill relieved him of the Finance portfolio, taking it on himself, citing "the continuing lack of ability by the department and ministry of finance to contain expenditure overruns outside of the budget appropriations". Polye retained the Treasury portfolio, and gained that of Border Development. Following the results of the 2012 general election Polye retained his position as Treasurer under a new cabinet announced by O'Neill. On 10 March 2014, O'Neill sacked him again, accusing him of having a destabilising effect on the government.

In December 2014, he replaced Belden Namah as Leader of the Opposition to O'Neill's government.

Polye lost the Kandep election in 2017 to Alfred Manase but disputed the results and a series of court cases took place until a recount was ordered. After a recount, he was elected to the tenth Parliament in April 2021.

Polye stood again for the eleventh Parliament in 2022. He was declared elected by returning officer Henry Apakali after he had been instructed by Electoral Commissioner Simon Sinai to stop the count due to integrity concerns. The declaration is pending legal review.
