= Melanesian Alliance Party =

- Leader: Joseph Yopyyopy
- President: James Chamilou
- General Secretary: Mek Onguglo
- Founder: John Momis and John Kaputin
- Political position: Centre-left
- National Parliament: 1 / 118

The Melanesian Alliance Party is a political party in Papua New Guinea.

== History ==
The party was co-founded by John Momis and John Kaputin in the late 1970s.

The party formed an association with the National Alliance Party prior to the 1997 general election, but relaunched as a separate party in February 2002 with three founding National Alliance members: Bernard Narokobi, Sir Moi Avei, and Dame Carol Kidu. Narokobi resumed the leadership, but lost his seat at the 2002 election.

It returned three MPs at the 2002 election: Sir Moi Avei (Kairuku-Hiri Open), Anderson Vele (Rigo Open) and Dame Carol Kidu (Moresby South Open). Avei assumed the leadership; however, he was replaced by Kidu in May 2007 after a leadership tribunal recommended Avei's dismissal from office. She was the sole MP returned for the party at the 2007 election. She retired at the 2012 election.

Kidu was succeeded as leader by Sam Akoitai for the 2012 election campaign; however, the party won no seats at the election. A subsequent offer from party secretary Nick Klapat for an independent MP to take the party leadership was not taken up.

The party is registered to contest the 2017 election. Wosera-Gaui MP Joseph Yopyyopy, formerly of the United Resources Party, was named party leader for the election.
