= People's Progress Party =

- Leader: Douglas Tomuriesa
- President: Brown Sinamoi
- Secretary: Moses Kar
- Founder: Julius Chan
- Founded: November 11, 1969
- National Parliament: 1 / 118

The People's Progress Party is a political party in Papua New Guinea.

It was founded on 11 November 1969 by Julius Chan and Warren Dutton, forming a caucus of eleven members of the House of Assembly of Papua and New Guinea.

Following independence in 1975, Chan served, while party leader, as Prime Minister from 1980 to 1982 and 1994 to 1997. Chan’s second Government was brought down by the Sandline Affair and the party suffered in the elections that year. Chan and acting Prime Minister John Giheno lost their seats, and Michael Nali became the party’s leader in Parliament.

When Chan was not serving as Prime Minister, the party was often a junior partner in a coalition with the Pangu Party. At the 2002 General Elections, the party won 8 seats, becoming the third largest party. At the 2007 General Election the party lost half of its seats. However, the party’s original leader, Julius Chan, returned to Parliament, and took over the party’s leadership. Chan ran as the opposition candidate for Prime Minister, but received the support of only 21 of the 109 members of Parliament.

The party had 5 members in the 111-seat National Parliament of Papua New Guinea as of September 2019 and was part of the governing coalition of Prime Minister Peter O'Neill.

== Current party leaders ==
- Douglas Tomuriesa

== Former party leaders ==
- Michael Nali: Led the party while Chan was out of Parliament. He held various ministerial positions, including Deputy Prime Minister. He switched from his Mendi Open seat to contest the Southern Highlands Provincial electorate in the 2007 Elections but did not win.
- Dr Allan Marat: 2003–2004 - Minister of Trade. Left the party and joined the Melanesian Liberal Party.
- Andrew Baing: 2004–2006 - Minister of Fisheries. Dismissed from Parliament for wrong conduct.
- Sir Julius Chan - Member for New Ireland Provincial
