= Sam Abal =

Papua New Guinean politician

The Honourable Sam Abal
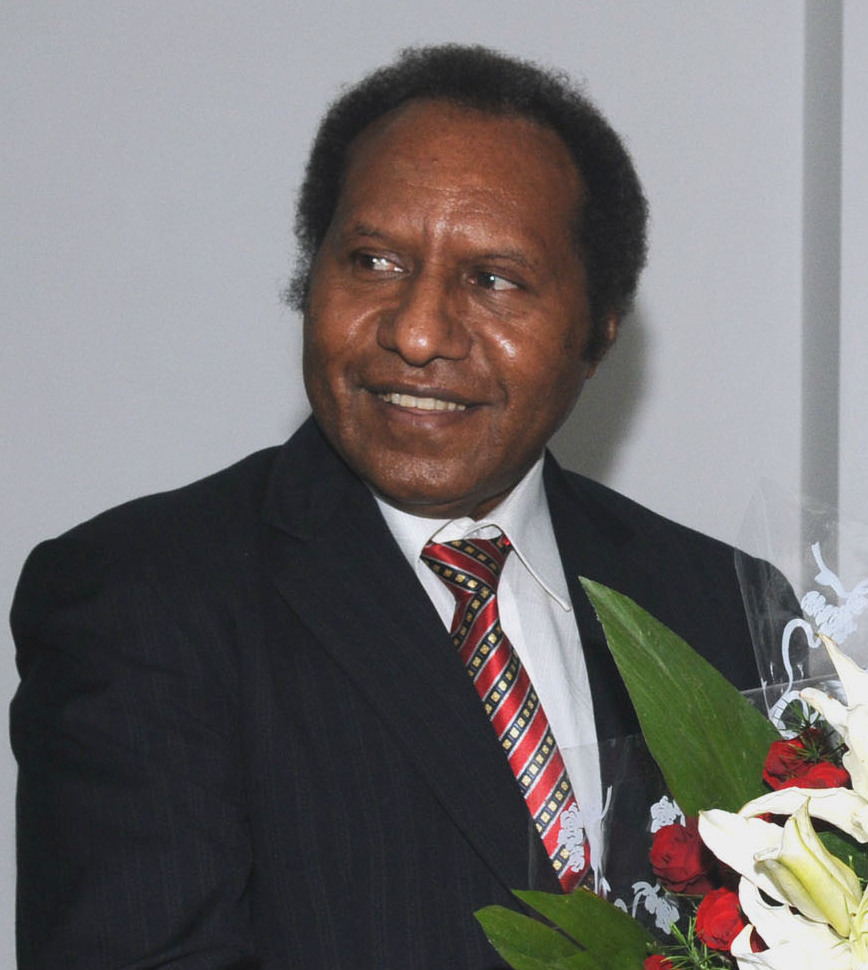
- Abal in 2009

Prime Minister of Papua New Guinea Acting
- In office 4 April 2011 – 2 August 2011
- Monarch: Elizabeth II
- Governor General: Michael Ogio
- Preceded by: Michael Somare
- Succeeded by: Peter O'Neill
- In office 13 December 2010 – 17 January 2011
- Monarch: Elizabeth II
- Governors General: Jeffrey Nape (acting); Michael Ogio
- Preceded by: Michael Somare
- Succeeded by: Michael Somare

Deputy Prime Minister of Papua New Guinea
- In office 7 December 2010 – 13 December 2010
- Prime Minister: Michael Somare
- Preceded by: Don Polye
- Succeeded by: Belden Namah

Minister of Foreign Affairs
- In office August 2007 – December 2010
- Prime Minister: Michael Somare
- Succeeded by: Don Polye

Member of the National Parliament of Papua New Guinea for Wabag Open
- In office December 2004 – 2012
- Preceded by: Himself
- Succeeded by: Robert Ganim
- In office 2002 – 21 March 2003
- Preceded by: Daniel Kapi
- Succeeded by: Himself

Personal details
- Born: 26 June 1958 (age 68)
- Party: National Alliance Party

Samuel Tei Abal (born 26 June 1958) is a Papua New Guinean politician. Abal, who previously served as Foreign Minister from August 2007 to December 2010, became the Deputy Prime Minister of the country in a cabinet reshuffle by Michael Somare on 7 December 2010. He further became acting Prime Minister of Papua New Guinea on 13 December 2010, when Prime Minister Somare stepped down from office to face a tribunal regarding allegations of financial mismanagement. His tenure as acting Prime Minister ended on 2 August 2011, when Peter O'Neill won a parliamentary vote to be appointed as Prime Minister. Since October 2021, he is the Ambassador Extraordinary and Plenipotentiary of Papua New Guinea to Japan.

== Biography ==
=== Personal life ===
Abal is the son of Sir Tei Abal, who is considered one of the founding fathers of Papua New Guinea.

=== Political career ===
Abal was a member of the National Parliament of Papua New Guinea representing the Wabag Electorate in Enga Province.

Prime Minister Michael Somare appointed Abal, his then Foreign Minister, as his new Deputy Prime Minister in a cabinet reshuffle on 7 December 2010. Abal was informed of the impending reshuffle prior to the appointment while attending a mining conference in Sydney, Australia, with Prime Minister Somare.

Somare removed his previous Deputy Prime Minister, Don Polye of Kandep, from the post in favour of Sam Abal, a close political ally of Somare. A rift had formed between Somare and Polye stemming from an unsuccessful motion of no confidence against Somare in mid-2010, which was believed to be partially spearheaded by Polye. Somare initiated the reshuffle in preparation for stepping down to face a leadership tribunal. It is alleged that Somare failed to submit financial statements between 1994 and 1997 and filed late statements between 1998 and 2004. Under Papua New Guinean law, the prime minister must leave office during the tribunal. The appointment of Abal guaranteed Somare a close ally as acting Prime Minister.

=== Acting Prime Minister ===
Somare stepped down as Prime Minister on 13 December 2010. In a prepared statement, Somare stated that "he will now voluntarily step aside and allow the deputy prime minister, Sam Abal, to assume (the) full function and responsibility of the office of prime minister while he attends to clearing his name." Abal was sworn into office the same day and served as the acting Prime Minister during Somare's tribunal and short suspension.

Abal once again became acting Prime Minister in April 2011 when Prime Minister Somare flew to Singapore for heart surgery. Somare remained in hospital in Singapore in intensive care until his retirement from office in late June 2011.

In June 2011, the body of a woman was found in the garden of his home in Port Moresby. His son Teo, "allegedly the last person to be seen with the woman", went missing at that time, and was found and arrested two days later by the police, as the prime suspect. Sam Abal "moved into a local hotel" as his home had become a crime scene.

As of 28 June 2011, it was unclear whether Abal would become the full-time Prime Minister following Somare's retirement from politics for health reasons. A spokesman for Michael Somare's son, Arthur Somare, said that "the political process will take its course" and decide Abal's political future. Abal had been Somare's deputy before serving as acting Prime Minister.

=== 2012 election ===
In 2012, Abal became the deputy Opposition Leader upon the retirement of opposition leader, Dame Carol Kidu.

In June 2012, the Papua New Guinea Post-Courier reported that Abal would run for re-election in the 2012 general election as a political independent. Abal stated he had lost faith in country's political party system, which had led to chaos and gridlock in the government. However, he lost his seat to People's Party candidate Robert Ganim.

Political offices
Preceded by Michael Somare	Prime Minister of Papua New Guinea; Acting; 2010–2011	Succeeded by Michael Somare
Preceded by Michael Somare	Prime Minister of Papua New Guinea; Acting; 2011	Succeeded by Peter O'Neill
Preceded by Don Polye	Deputy Prime Minister of Papua New Guinea; 2010–2011	Succeeded by Belden Namah
