= Puka Temu =

Papua New Guinean politician

The Honourable Sir Puka Temu KBE CMG MP
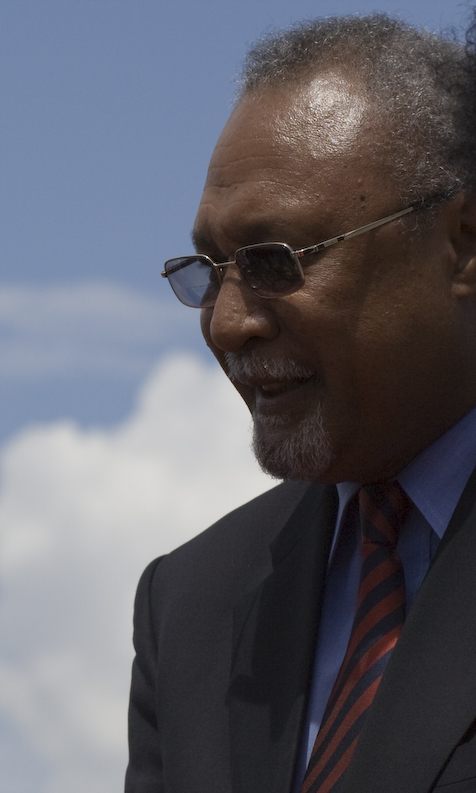
- Temu in 2009

Minister for Health & HIV/AIDS
- In office 1 October 2020 – 16 November 2020
- Prime Minister: James Marape
- Succeeded by: Jelta Wong
- In office August 2017 – April 2019
- Prime Minister: Peter O'Neill

Minister for Bougainville Affairs
- In office 7 June 2019 – 30 September 2020
- Prime Minister: James Marape

Deputy Prime Minister of Papua New Guinea
- In office 29 August 2007 – July 2010
- Prime Minister: Michael Somare

Member of the National Parliament of Papua New Guinea
- Incumbent
- Assumed office 13 January 2004
- Preceded by: Puka Temu
- Constituency: Abau Open
- In office 2002 – 5 March 2003
- Preceded by: Kilroy Genia
- Succeeded by: Puka Temu
- Constituency: Abau Open

Personal details
- Born: 7 January 1954 (age 72)
- Party: Our Development Party (2019–), (2012)
- Other political affiliations: People's National Congress (2012–2019); National Alliance Party (2002-2012)
- Education: UPNG

Sir Puka Iga Temu KBE, CMG (born 7 January 1954) is a Papua New Guinean politician. He has been a member of the National Parliament of Papua New Guinea since 2002, representing the electorate of Abau Open. A former Deputy Prime Minister under Michael Somare, he is part of Prime Minister James Marape's government as a member of the Our Development Party.

== Early life ==
Temu attended Konepoti Primary School and Iarowari High School. He graduated from the University of Papua New Guinea in 1976 with a Bachelor of Medicine and Surgery. He completed a master's degree in Medicine in Sydney and Melbourne in 1985.

He served in the public service for 29 years, including as Secretary for the Department of Health from 1996 to 2001.

== Political career ==
Temu was first elected to Parliament in the 2002 elections for the seat of Abau Open, representing the National Alliance Party. He was appointed as Minister for National Planning and Monitoring, Provincial Affairs, Works and Transport in a caretaking capacity following Prime Minister Michael Somare's election. He then became Minister for Public Service on 13 August 2002 and Leader of Government Business on 27 August 2002.

Temu was disqualified from Parliament on 5 March 2003 by the Court of Disputed Returns due to two campaign donations which the court said was an attempt to bribe voters. He was re-elected in a by-election on 16 December 2003, which was the first election in the country to use the new limited preferential voting (LPV) system.

He was sworn in to Parliament again on 13 January 2004. On 15 January, he was sworn in as Minister for State Enterprises and Information, a post he held until 20 December 2004. He remained in Cabinet without a ministry until 7 January 2005 when he was appointed as Minister for Lands and Physical Planning and Minister for State. In June 2006 he relinquished duties as Minister for State.

He was re-elected at the 2007 election, after which he was appointed Deputy Prime Minister, Minister of Lands and Physical Planning and Minister for Mining on 29 August 2007 under Prime Minister Michael Somare.

In July 2010, he spearheaded an attempt to overthrow Somare through a parliamentary vote of no confidence. When the motion failed, he became Leader of the Opposition, and was replaced as Deputy Prime Minister by Don Polye.

In August 2011, Peter O'Neill became Prime Minister in the wake of a parliamentary motion of no confidence in the government of Acting Prime Minister Sam Abal. O'Neill appointed Sir Puka as his Minister for Agriculture and Livestock on 5 August 2011.

He was re-elected at the 2012 election as a member of the Our Development Party. Following the election he joined People's National Congress, reportedly to enable O'Neill to form government. He was then appointed as Minister for Transport. He was then appointed Minister for Public Service and then Minister for Health and HIV/AIDS.

In May 2019 Temu returned to the Our Development Party. He became Minister for Bougainville Affairs in June 2019 and oversaw the 2019 Bougainvillean Independence Referendum.

At the 2022 election he was re-elected to Parliament and was appointed Deputy Chairman of the Special Parliament Committee on the 2022 General Election by Prime Minister James Marape.

== Personal life ==
Dr. Temu is a medical doctor. He is a United Church Christian.

He received a Companion Order of St Michael and St George and was made an Honorary Fellow of the Australian College of Health Services Executives in 2000.

Temu was appointed Knight Commander of the Order of the British Empire (KBE) in the 2009 Birthday Honours.

Political offices
Preceded by Don Polye	Deputy Prime Minister of Papua New Guinea; 2007–2010	Succeeded by Don Polye
