= United Resources Party =

- Leader: William Duma
- President: Mose Kopyoto
- Secretary: Stephen Pim
- Founder: Anderson Agiru
- Founded: December 1997 (28 years ago)
- Ideology: Resource nationalism
- National Parliament: 12 / 118

The United Resources Party is a political party in Papua New Guinea.

== Foundation, Agiru and Akoitai's leadership ==
It was established in December 1997 by Southern Highlands Governor Anderson Agiru, who became the inaugural leader. Its platform emphasised equitable returns from resource development. The party initially supported Bill Skate as Prime Minister, although they later withdrew their support. It grew through the course of 1998, with four MPs in August, five in October, and six in December: Agiru, Masket Iangalio, Peter Ipatas, Alfred Kaiabe, Charles Luta and Roy Yaki. Ipatas defected to the People's Democratic Movement in April 2001.

Agiru was dismissed from office and banned from public office for three years in January 2002 after being found guilty of misconduct by a leadership tribunal, and failed in repeated attempts to overturn the ban to allow him to contest the June 2002 election. Central Bougainville MP Sam Akoitai was the party's only MP after the election, and in July 2002, he became the party's second leader, with Agiru stating "the party is here to stay". Following the election, the URP switched their support to new Prime Minister Michael Somare. By December, Akoitai was serving as Mining Minister in the Somare government, and it was reported that seven independent MPs had joined the party. It gained a second ministry in August 2003.

== Tim Neville's leadership and factional conflict ==
In November 2003, Akoitai was replaced as leader by Tim Neville, who stated "we wanted to put some fire into the party", heading what had become a caucus of nine MPs. A week later, it merged with the Pan Melanesia Congress and the Advance People's Party, increasing their numbers to thirteen and making them the second largest party in the National Parliament after the governing National Alliance Party. The merger was queried by former leader Agiru, who highlighted the regulatory requirements for amalgamation under the Integrity Law. In January 2004, Akoitai and Agiru attempted to eject eight United Resources Party MPs who had been originally elected as independents from the party: Neville, William Duma, Isaac Taitibe, John Vulupindi, Benny Allen, Kuri Kingal, Clement Nakmai and Malcolm 'Kela' Smith.

In March 2004, both Akoitai and Neville claimed to be the legitimate leader of the party. By April, the two were largely leading separate factions, with Akoitai claiming to lead a four-member URP with Smith, Nakmai and Duma, and Neville claiming that he remained leader. This left the party with some members aligned with the government and some with the opposition. In June 2004, Peter Launa, a candidate for the Neville faction, was elected in a by-election for the Chimbu Regional seat. In July 2004, Speaker Jeffrey Nape ruled that only Akoitai and Launa would be recognised as URP MPs; however, Akoitai and Neville continued to publicly wrangle over the leadership. In November, the Registrar of Political Parties and Speaker Nape recognised different people as being the URP leader, leading to an angry stoush between Nape and Neville in parliament. After mid-2005, the split ceased making news, with Akoitai resuming the leadership and Neville eventually returning to being an independent MP; however, both Akoitai and Neville lost their seats at the 2007 election.

== William Duma's leadership ==
The United Resources Party returned five MPs at the 2007 election, including Benny Allan, Roy Biyama, William Duma, Guma Wau, and Agiru, who returned after five years out of office. The party joined the governing coalition. The party's former deputy leader, Duma, assumed the leadership, and became Minister for Petroleum and Energy under Prime Minister Michael Somare. Puri Ruing joined the party in July 2010, and was appointed Minister for Internal Security in December 2010, joining Duma in Cabinet. In June 2011, Acting Prime Minister Sam Abal sacked Duma from Cabinet. The party had at that time recently held a fundraising dinner at which controversial Australian mining magnate and politician Clive Palmer had spoken and raised $AU600,000.

By mid-2011, the party was once again reported to feature two factions engaged in a battle over the party leadership, one headed by Duma and one by party founder Agiru. In June, Duma sacked Agiru ally and assistant minister Francis Potape from the party, before sacking Agiru himself later in the month. In February 2012, Palmer was reported to have headed another fundraising dinner which raised $AU10000. The party switched support after Duma's sacking, and he again became Minister for Mines and Petroleum under new Prime Minister Peter O'Neill. In June 2012, Duma declared his aspiration to become Prime Minister after the 2012 election.

The party won seven seats at the 2012 election: Mai Dop, Duma, Joe Lera, Benjamin Phillip, Steven Kamma Pirika, Fabian Pok and Anton Yagama. Duma was sacked from Cabinet a second time in February 2014. Duma's relationship with Palmer was again cause for controversy at the time of his sacking, considering his mining portfolio: it was reported that they had been close since 2008, and that he had stayed with Palmer when visiting Brisbane, Australia. He stated that he was "proud" to call Palmer a friend. In July, it was reported that Phillip and Francis Marus had defected from the URP to the governing People's National Congress. The party continued to support the O'Neill government, while Pirika Kamma and later Lera served in Cabinet. Pirika Kamma died in February 2016.

The party had 10 members in the 111-seat National Parliament of Papua New Guinea as of September 2019.

== Leaders ==
- Anderson Agiru (1997-2002)
- Sam Akoitai (2002-2003)
- Tim Neville (2003-2004)
- split between Tim Neville and Sam Akoitai (2004-2005)
- Sam Akoitai (2005-2007)
- William Duma (2007–present)
