= Bryan Jared Kramer =

Papua New Guinean politician

The Honorable Bryan Kramer MP
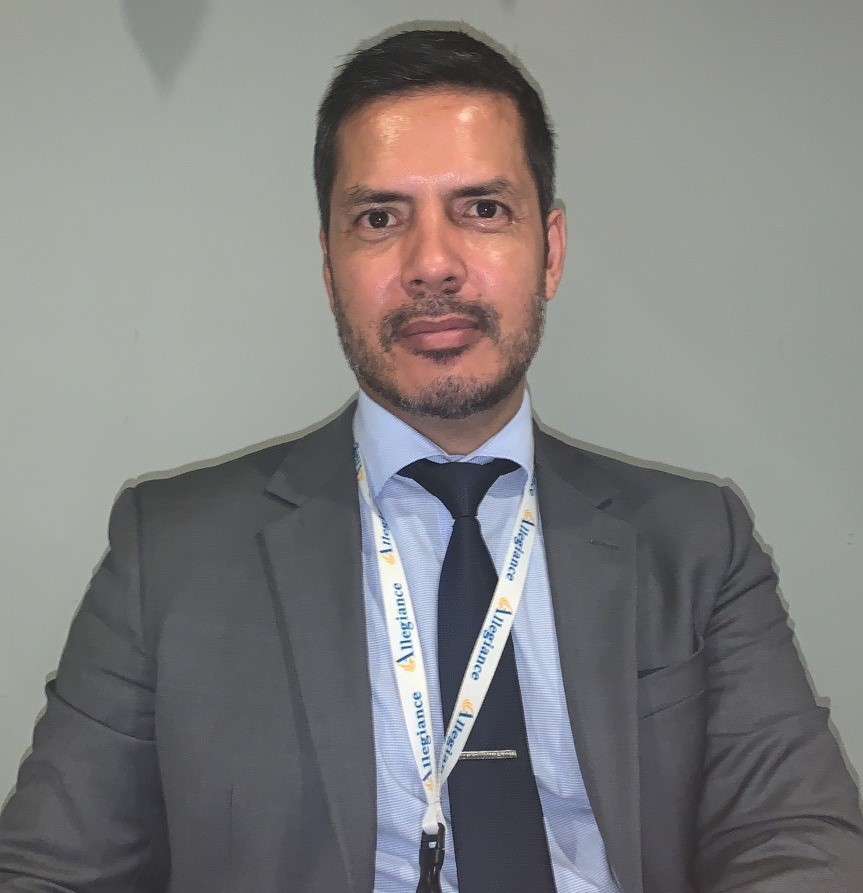
- Kramer in 2020

Minister for Labour and Immigration
- In office 23 August 2022 – 24 May 2023 (dismissed)
- Prime Minister: James Marape

Minister for Immigration and Citizenship
- In office 13 April 2022 – 10 August 2022
- Prime Minister: James Marape
- Preceded by: Westley Nukundj

Minister for Justice
- In office 21 December 2020 – 12 April 2022
- Prime Minister: James Marape
- Preceded by: Davis Steven

Minister for Police
- In office 7 June 2019 – 20 December 2020
- Prime Minister: James Marape
- Preceded by: Jelta Wong

Member of the National Parliament of Papua New Guinea
- In office August 2017 – 24 May 2023 (dismissed)
- Preceded by: Nixon Duban
- Constituency: Madang Open

Personal details
- Born: 3 November 1975 (age 50–51) Madang
- Party: Allegiance Party (2018–)
- Other political affiliations: Pangu Party (2017–2018)
- Children: None
- Education: Divine Word University
- Profession: Accountant

The Honorable Bryan Jared Kramer MP (born 3 November 1975) is a Papua New Guinea politician and Member of the 10th and 11th Parliament of Papua New Guinea. Formerly a member of the Pangu Party, he founded the Allegiance Party, of which he was the sole MP, in 2018. He ran nine candidates in the 2022 National Elections, including one in each of Madang's seven electorates. Kramer was returned with a sizeable majority, but was unsuccessful in securing the election of another Party member. He was suspended from office on 30 September 2022 pending the outcomes of a leadership tribunal. On Tuesday 28 February 2023 the three-man bench unanimously found Kramer guilty of seven counts against him. A three-man bench recommended dismissal for two counts of "scandalising the judiciary" and fines totalling K10,000 (USD3,000) for five counts related to use of district funds. Kramer was dismissed from office by the Governor General on 24 May 2023. He will not be able to re-contest an election for five years, allowing him to compete in the 2032 election. A by-election for Madang Open will be held in 2024.

After almost four years Kramer's flagship project, the refurbishment of just over 5 km of Madang town's Modilon Road, remains unfinished.

== Education ==
Kramer attended Madang International Primary School from 1980–1988, and then attended St. Brendan's College, Yeppoon, in Queensland, Australia, until 1992. He finished Year 12 at Divine Word University, Madang, and graduated with a diploma in business and a degree in accounting, also from Divine Word University, in 1999.

== Career ==
Kramer started his career in private enterprise, based in his hometown of Madang. After a range of entrepreneurial activity, including founder and manager of the Club 69 nightclubs in Madang and Lae (where Lands Minister John Rosso and Health Minister Jelta Wong were regulars), Organising Committee Member of the Miss PNG franchise of the Miss Pacific Islands beauty pageant (with Dadi Toka Jr) and roles with major accounting firms and in his uncle's civil engineering and construction company, Kramer Ausenco, he contested the seat of Madang Open in the 2007 Papua New Guinea election, at the age of 31. Kramer polled seventh, with 2,644 votes, but continued to run and won the seat in the 2017 Papua New Guinea elections as a member of Pangu Party (Pangu Pati), then led by Sam Basil, with a majority of 21,248 votes. Prime Minister Peter O'Neill formed government, with members of Pangu Pati and some other political parties forming opposition.

In September 2017 Basil and some other Pangu Pati members moved to join the O'Neill Government, causing a split as Kramer and four other Pangu Pati members (including former Prime Minister Sir Mekere Morauta) chose to remain in opposition. Kramer formally announced his resignation from Pangu Pati in March 2018, signalling that he intended to launch a new party called the Allegiance Party. Kramer held the position of Shadow Minister for Public Enterprises and State Investments and Public Service in the opposition led by Patrick Pruaitch. Kramer was appointed Minister for Police in the Marape-Steven Government on 17 June 2019. He was subsequently appointed Minister for Justice in the Marape-Basil Government on 21 December 2020, and Minister for Immigration and Citizenship on 13 April 2022.

In May 2018 Kramer formally registered the Allegiance Party. Kramer was the only Allegiance Party member elected as Member of Parliament.

=== Anti-Corruption Tsar ===
Kramer is best known for leading a movement in Papua New Guinea against the country's endemic corruption. Tagged PNG's "Anti-Corruption Tsar" by international media, he was elected on a platform of transparency and good governance. Entering Parliament in opposition, he was quick to put transparency and governance on the national agenda. In June 2018 Kramer launched an offensive against Papua New Guinea's daily newspapers, The National and Post-Courier, calling for a boycott to protest corruption and their support for the O'Neill Government. It prompted a rebuke from the Media Council of Papua New Guinea.

In October 2018, Kramer was part of an opposition-led national strike over the purchase of a fleet of Maserati and Bentley cars by the PNG Government for use as PNG hosted the final events of APEC Papua New Guinea 2018. The incident, which became known as Maseratigate, received international attention and ongoing coverage, particularly after it was revealed a number of vehicles procured for APEC had subsequently gone missing. Despite continued international pressure, and a commitment by the Marape-Steven government to release a report into APEC spending after accusations of fraud were made, no public accounting of the cars or APEC finances has been released.

In February 2019, Kramer released an analysis of costs related to the destruction of PNG Parliament Haus property by security personnel shortly after APEC activities ended. Immediate estimates of the costs were up to PGK15 million. Kramer's analysis of costs once details were released suggested inflated contracts were being given to businesses with Government connections.

As the COVID-19 crisis struck in early 2020, Kramer led the PNG Government's communications efforts, articulating government policies and guiding public acceptance of measures in a country less affected by the pandemic. When rumours surfaced that money had been misappropriated, Kramer was quick to criticise media coverage. However, when he announced a self-led audit of COVID accounts, he attracted strong criticism. In early June, he announced via his Facebook page that he was unable to complete the task. After an independent audit firm was asked to provide services pro-bono, Kramer released a preliminary update on the use of funds, saying a full report would be released at a later date. While the report was completed, its release was delayed pending approval by Prime Minister Marape.

=== Kramer vs O'Neill ===
From the time he was elected, Kramer mounted a sustained campaign to undermine the leadership of then Prime Minister Peter O'Neill citing corruption and insider dealing. This and increasing dissatisfaction with O'Neill's dealings from within his own party saw opponents coalesce around allegations of corruption in a leaked Ombudsman's report investigating the purchase of Oil Search shares by the State in 2014. The leak prompted a split in O'Neill's People's National Congress Party, led by former Finance Minister James Marape. Kramer worked closely with the opposition (predominantly National Alliance members), Marape and Pangu Pati to trigger O'Neill's resignation on 26 May 2019. On 27 May 2019, a vote of Parliament saw Marape elected 8th Prime Minister of Papua New Guinea. Kramer was subsequently appointed Minister for Police.

Kramer quickly called for renewed investigations into O'Neill government activities, including the purchase of Maseratis for APEC and the controversial state purchase of Oil Search shares. These investigations involve colleagues including Minister for Urbanisation Justin Tkatchenko, who was responsible for the Maserati procurement as Minister for APEC, and Prime Minister Marape, who was implicated in the Ombudsman's Report into the purchase of Oil Search shares as Minister for Finance when the procurement took place. In July 2019, after commitments by the Marape-Steven government to open a Commission of Inquiry into the findings of the Ombudsman Commission report into the UBS Loan, the Australian Financial Review provided further information about concerning transactions. However, the Commission of Inquiry progressed slowly and costs increased dramatically when foreign lawyers became involved; as a consequence, the Committee failed to progress matters in 2019.

In October 2019 police issued a warrant for the arrest of O'Neill citing "official corruption." However, O'Neill refused to cooperate, claiming the charges were "false and fabricated in a clumsy way" by Kramer, whom he also accused of politicising the police force and "blatant interference in police operations." After a period in Australia, and after calling for Kramer's removal, O'Neill returned to Papua New Guinea but did not appear for the final sitting of Parliament. Despite this and other calls for Marape to remove Kramer from office, he successfully held his position in the last Ministerial reshuffle for 2019.

After an extended period in Australia, O'Neill returned to Papua New Guinea on 24 May 2020 and was immediately arrested by police in relation to the purchase of two generators from Israeli interests. He was released on bail and allowed to complete the mandatory 14 day quarantine period at home. He subsequently returned to PNG Parliament during its June sitting and challenged the Marape-Steven Government over a range of issues from debt escalation to the management of the COVID-19 crisis. However, this renewed vigour did not stop Members of Parliament from continuing to leave his People's National Congress party.

On its sitting of 6 November 2020, Parliament was disrupted when over 40 members of the Government crossed the floor and the Opposition took control of the house. Led by Hon. Belden Namah, and supported by O'Neill, they voted 57-39 to suspend Parliament until 2 December 2020. This would defer sitting until a Vote of No Confidence was allowed and the Opposition could attempt to remove Marape and replace him with a new Prime Minister. Members crossing the floor included Deputy Prime Minister Sam Basil and Minister for State-Owned Enterprises Sasindran Muthuvel. The Opposition went into camp in Vanimo, in Namah's electorate and one of the furthest places from the capital Port Moresby. The Government marshalled numbers and, on the advice of Kramer, on Monday 16 November the Speaker, Job Pomat, announced that the motion to adjourn Parliament was incorrectly moved and that Parliament would resume as scheduled at 10am on Tuesday 17 November. The Opposition remained in Vanimo; Parliament resumed, the 2021 Budget was passed and Parliament adjourned until 20 April 2021. O'Neill attempted to have the Court issue a stay order and stop Parliament from convening, but was unsuccessful.

The Opposition successfully challenged the adjournment, with a five-man bench of the Supreme Court ruling the resumption, and therefore adjournment, unconstitutional. Pomat convened Parliament on Monday 14 December, which was disrupted by arguments over the status of Opposition member Bari Palma, who was an undischarged bankrupt when elected and may have been ineligible to stand. The Speaker suspended Parliament to Wednesday 16 December and asked the Court to determine Palma's eligibility. On 15 December the Opposition nominated former Foreign Minister Patrick Pruaitch as alternate Prime Minister and lodged a motion for a Vote of No Confidence. But when Parliament resumed on 16 December, Members including Basil and Muthuvel crossed the floor and rejoined the Government, which then passed the 2021 Budget and adjourned Parliament to 20 April 2021. Throughout these events, Kramer remained a Government stalwart and used his Facebook page to interrogate court proceedings and sew dissent through Opposition ranks; his "hug" with Madang Governor Peter Yama after Yama crossed the floor was noted as one of the more surprising events of the day, given each had outstanding court actions against the other.

=== Minister for Police ===
Prior to his appointment as Police Minister, Kramer claimed that members of the police force were actively planning an arrest and/or assassination attempt against him. He was quoted as saying "I have no question of doubt I will eventually get killed for what I do. It goes without saying when you get in the way of those stealing billions in public funds, they will do whatever it takes to get rid of you."

As Minister for Police, Kramer has pursued reform of the police force, which has been troubled by allegations of corruption and abuse. He removed long-term acting Police Commissioner Gari Baki in July 2019, saying he was past compulsory retirement age and needed to be stood down. Despite Baki's attempts at reinstatement, the dismissal was successful. He appointed David Manning as acting Commissioner; Manning was confirmed in the position by a decision of the National Executive Council in December 2019. It was much speculated that Manning received the position because he was "tambu" (an in-law, or relative by marriage) of Kramer; however, Kramer has clarified that this allegation is false.

Concerned about ongoing mismanagement of police finances, in June 2020 Kramer called the Fraud Squad to task about high rental costs. After investigation, Kramer determined that a company owned by a foreign national was charging high and escalating rents on a building leased by the Fraud Squad. He asked Commissioner for Taxation Sam Koim to investigate the company involved.

In August 2020 the Royal PNG Constabulary and Australian Federal Police jointly undertook one of the largest drug busts in both countries' histories, with over 500 kg of cocaine seized from a Cessna light aircraft that crashed shortly after takeoff on a secluded runway in Papa Lealea, Central Province. Five Australians were immediately arrested; the pilot was initially detained on illegal entry charges pending further drug-related charges. Kramer acknowledged the role played by PNG police in the operation, saying the multi-agency operation had been going on for two years.

In September 2020 Kramer launched a broadside on Facebook against his own police department, which was subsequently reported in the international media. In the post, Kramer accused the Royal PNG Constabulary of widespread corruption, claiming that "Senior officers based in Police Headquarters in Port Moresby were stealing from their own retired officers’ pension funds. They were implicated in organised crime, drug syndicates, smuggling firearms, stealing fuel, insurance scams, and even misusing police allowances. They misused tens of millions of kina allocated for police housing, resources, and welfare. We also uncovered many cases of senior officers facilitating the theft of Police land." He also said that corruption in PNG was "so deep-rooted and so entrenched in every aspect of politics and business that it is almost beyond comprehension, and appears never-ending." The statements triggered responses from former Police Commissioner Gary Baki and former Assistant Commissioner Sylvester Kalaut. Baki challenged police to arrest him; Kalaut threatened to sue Kramer over his allegations concerning the theft of pension funds, charges for which Kalaut and another former RPNGC employee, Bob Kerry, were before the court.

On October 9, Marape and Kramer launched the first police Station of Excellence in Waigani, Port Moresby. The program, a collaboration with the Australian Government, upgrades key police stations installing modern equipment such as biometric staff movement logging, dashcams and GPS monitoring systems. Kramer used the opening to reinforce performance expectations, saying "the days of misusing [police] vehicles are gone" and "you cannot hide what you are doing, it will be recorded and accessed by CCTV operators and the police station commander."

Kramer was appointed Minister for Justice in the Marape-Basil Government on 21 December 2020 after a major cabinet reshuffle. His successor as Minister for Police was Hon. William Onglo, Member for Kundiawa Gembogl, of the United Resource Party.

=== Minister for Justice ===
Kramer continued to advocate for COVID management after leaving the Police portfolio, most notably in March 2021 after he contracted COVID himself. In response to widespread social media coverage casting doubt on the safety and efficacy of COVID vaccines, he published a number of statements including a commitment to be among the first to take the AstraZeneca vaccine, which rolled out in early April 2021.

Kramer pursued a number of high-profile cases as Minister for Justice, his department working with the RPNGC's newly formed Special Police Forensic Criminal Investigation Team. Australian national and former high-profile acting Managing Director of PNG Power, Carolyn Blacklock, was arrested on charges of conspiring to forge an employment contract and defrauding the State of over PGK1.7 million. The charges were subsequently dismissed due to "lack of evidence."

Kramer brought a record number of submissions to the National Executive Council and Parliament during his term as Minister, with Attorney-General and Secretary for Justice Dr Eric Kwa saying that "We have checked the records and confirmed that this is the first time in the history of the Department [that] we have had more submissions and decisions taken up to the Cabinet since Minister Kramer took office." Six pieces of legislation were passed by Parliament in 2021.

=== Minister for Labour and Immigration ===
Kramer was appointed Minister for Immigration and Citizenship on 13 April 2022, in a minor cabinet reshuffle shortly before the issue of writs for the PNG National Election 2022. He was reappointed in a combined portfolio as Minister for Labour and Immigration on 23 August 2022. He was suspended from the role on September 30, 2022 on the commencement of a leadership tribunal brought by the Chief Ombudsman.

=== Leadership Tribunal ===
Chief Ombudsman Richard Pagan initiated court proceedings for a leadership tribunal after complaints against Kramer were made, including by Chief Justice Sir Gibbs Salika, under Papua New Guinea's Organic Law on the Duties and Responsibilities of Leadership. Kramer had 14 allegations of misconduct in office raised against him, including charges of scandalising the judiciary and insinuating a conflict of interest brought forward by Salika over social media publications referring to Salika and to purported fake documents filed after the arrest of O'Neill in 2019. Other charges included misappropriation of Madang District funds. Two charges were subsequently dropped, including an allegation that Kramer had misappropriated PGK30 million of District funds which withdrawn when the Public Prosecutor was unable to substantiate the charge with evidence.

Kramer vigorously denied all charges, saying that the allegations were vexatious and unsubstantiated. However, on Tuesday 28 February 2023 the three-man bench unanimously found Kramer guilty of seven counts against him. Dismissal was recommended for two counts of "scandalising the judiciary" and fines totalling K10,000 (USD3,000) for five counts related to use of district funds. Kramer was dismissed from office through a gazetted notice by the Governor General on 24 May 2023.

=== Member for Madang ===
As Member for Madang, Kramer has led efforts to restore law and order to Madang which has seen increased violence, including sorcery related killings and beheadings, since 2013. In early 2020 Kramer directed an increased police presence into Madang to address this and introduce improved community policing.

A particularly violent spate of attacks have taken place in Transgogol LLG. In late 2020 Kramer negotiated a surrender and reconciliation ceremony after a week of awareness training during which 200 men in Transgogol surrendered firearms, drugs and stills for making homebrew.

Kramer has been followed by rumours that he holds an Australian citizenship, and is therefore ineligible to stand for Parliament under Papua New Guinea law. Kramer has repeatedly refuted these claims, including by posting on Facebook a letter from Australia's Department of Home Affairs confirming that he was not, nor had he ever been, an Australian citizen. Despite this, Governor of Madang Peter Yama filed a court application in October 2020, again contesting Kramer's citizenship and asking that the court make a ruling on the validity of his election in 2017. Kramer subsequently released his birth certificate to the media, saying that this should put his citizenship beyond doubt.

Shortly after Kramer took office as Minister for Justice, Justice David Cannings commenced a self-initiated action to investigate the responsibility for dilapidated roads in Madang town. In an advertisement in both national newspapers, the action was listed for 11 January and summoned officials including the Provincial Administrator, Madang District CEO, Town Manager and Provincial Works Manager to appear in court to explain who was responsible for fixing Madang’s roads. Cannings had initiated similar action over a prolonged fishing ban in early 2020. Cannings found that the Provincial Government (led by Governor Peter Yama) was responsible for maintaining and rehabilitating Madang roads, and that road conditions were very poor due to years of neglect and insufficient funding for maintenance and rehabilitation. He further found that funds allocated appeared to have been misapplied, under-applied or ineffectively applied, and that there had been problems with the capacity/or integrity of the contractors engaged in the past. However, Kramer was directed to address the problem, despite most roads being Provincial Government responsibility. Cannings further stated that "I accept the evidence of the Member of Madang Open Bryan Kramer MP, that he has taken initiative and been proactive and assertive in securing funds necessary to at least address the problem of Modilon Road."

Work on the approximately 5 kilometers of roads commenced in late 2021 after Kramer established a District-owned entity, Madang District Works & Equipment Ltd. Work progressed through the rainy season of 2021/22, with international engineering firm Kramer Ausenco providing pro-bono project management services. The road remained unfinished in May 2023.

== Facebook Page ==
Kramer published a Facebook page called "The Kramer Report". The investigations into corruption published there were instrumental in both Kramer's election in 2017 and in a number of subsequent court cases. In late 2021 he retired "The Kramer Report" and established the "Madang Open MP" page.
