= Investigation Task Force Sweep =

Papua New Guinea government anti-corruption initiative

Investigation Task Force Sweep was established in Papua New Guinea (PNG) on 12 August 2011, following a resolution by the National Executive Council (NEC). The initiative was spearheaded by Prime Minister Peter O'Neill as part of his well-publicised anti-corruption drive.

The mandate of Task Force Sweep was initially to investigate allegations of corruption and mismanagement in the Department of National Planning and Monitoring, but the scope was expanded to include investigating allegations of corruption in a number of other government departments and their officials.

Task Force Sweep is currently chaired by Sam Koim, the Principal Legal Officer at the Department of Justice and Attorney-General. The investigations are led by the Police Department's Fraud and Anti-Corruption Unit and Finance Intelligence Unit (FIU). The team is composed of senior members of the Police Force, Public Prosecutor's Office, Internal Revenue Commission, the Ombudsman Commission, the Auditor General's Office, the Justice Department, Treasury and Provincial and Local Level Government. Due to its composition, Task Force Sweep has the power to investigate, prosecute and recover the proceeds of crime.

== Investigations ==
The primary matter for investigation by Task Force Sweep was with respect to monies appropriated through the Development Budget from 2009 to 2011, and in particular the PGK125 million intended for the Kokopo Community Projects and a PGK10 million sum that was disbursed to Kokopo businessman Eremas Wartoto.

In October 2012, Sam Koim concluded that almost half of PNG's PGK7.6 billion development budget for the period 2009 to 2011, had been lost through corruption, misappropriation and mismanagement. According to Koim, "We have uncovered a lot of instances where there was no recourse to budget and people were spending money left, right and centre, squandering funds and using them for private purposes".

The Task Force created a watch list of 33 prominent individuals and has asked the national airline Air Niugini to monitor the movements of these individuals. Since the creation of this list in September 2011, a number of individuals named on it have been arrested, including the politician Paul Tiensten and former Acting Secretary of the Department of National Planning, Ruby Zarriga.

According to a statement issued by Koim in November 2012, Task Force Sweep has registered 174 complaints about corruption, since its inception. Of these, 52 cases have been investigated.

=== Arrests ===
Task Force Sweep has made 40 arrests since it was established in 2011:

- In August 2011, businessman Eremas Wartoto became the first person to be arrested by Task Force Sweep, in relation to the misappropriation of PGK7 million of public funds, designated for an education project. Jeffery Yakopyia, a former assistance secretary in the economic division of National Planning and Monitoring Department has also been arrested in connection with the investigation into Wartoto.
- Ruby Zarriga was arrested in September 2011 on allegations of conspiracy to defraud the State and misappropriation of public funds, relating to a PGK10 million payment to businessman Eremas Wartoto.
- Former MP Alois Kingsley was arrested in September 2011 for receiving PGK6.6 million from the Kokopo Infrastructure Fund. He is reportedly in Kokopo jail, where he has been denied bail.
- In early November 2011, Francis Ank, treasurer for the Komo-Margarima district, was arrested by the task force and charged with the theft of PGK2 million. Subsequently, he was separately charged with 21 counts of misappropriating PGK300,000 from the district.
- Paul Tiensten was arrested in November 2011 following allegations of misappropriation of funds, conspiracy to defraud the state and abuse of office. It was alleged that Tiensten authorised a PGK10 million payment of air subsidies to Travel Air, of which Tiensten holds a stake.
- Minister of Petroleum and Energy, Francis Potape was arrested in November 2011 on allegations of misappropriating public funds amounting to PGK60,000;
- In December 2011, businessman David Kumalau Pondros was arrested by Task Force Sweep for the misappropriation of PGK400,000 belonging to the Oro provincial government. Pondros was previously arrested in October 2011 for misappropriating over PGK6 million from the National Planning Department. The case is pending in court.
- On 17 January 2012, Australian businessman and Sarakolok West Transport (SWT) General Manager, Timothy Rowland, was arrested by Task Force Sweep. SWT is alleged to have tried to extort US$4.5 million from the Manus provincial government through the sale of a boat that had already been paid for by the National Planning Department.
- Zebedee Jabri Kalup, the head of Zenalis Waterfalls Ltd and the executive officer to the Madang MP, Buka Malai, was arrested by Task Force Sweep on 23 January 2012 for allegedly misappropriating PGK4.25 million from the Department of National Planning and Monitoring. The charges stemmed from Kalup's alleged misappropriation of PGK2.5 million, which had been granted by the Department of National Planning and Monitoring for the rehabilitation of Sitepra Cocoa Estate, but was paid into the private business account of Zenalis Waterfalls Ltd. Kalup has been charged by Task Force Sweep with six counts of misappropriation and false pretence, but has been released on a PGK600,000 bail.
- In early September 2012, Sam Koim announced that Task Force Sweep had made four further arrests. This included the arrests of Tracey Tiran, a director of Sits-Up Services Ltd; Daniel Peter Yaro, the General Manager of Yurr Construction Limited; and Tumbi Yari, the Acting District Administrator of Komo-Magarima District. Each were arrested and charged with the misappropriation of public funds allocated by the Department of National Planning and Monitoring.
- In late September 2012, Task Force Sweep issued a warrant for the arrest of Jeffrey Nape, the former Speaker of Parliament, for the alleged misuse of PGK5 million of funds intended for the rehabilitation education sector infrastructure program for schools in Sinasina-Yongumugl. Nape was arrested by police and taken to Port Moresby, where he was detained for questioning.
- Anton Kulit, the former Secretary for the Department of Commerce and Industry was arrested by Task Force Sweep in September 2012 and charged with misappropriation and conspiracy to defraud the government of a grant worth PGK3 million intended for piggery and poultry projects in East New Britain Province.
- Australian businessman, Leonard Patrick Capon was arrested by Task Force Sweep in November 2012 and charged with the misappropriation of public funds. The Department of National Planning and Monitoring had paid Capon's company, Rural Development Services Ltd, PGK1.5 million for the development of a new mini-hydroelectric power project in Hela Province in PNG's Southern Highlands. However, the project was never completed and the funds were allegedly diverted.
- On 20 December 2012, Peter Tokunai, the owner of Islands Energy Limited was arrested by Task Force Sweep and charged with misappropriation. Tokunai is alleged to have received PGK1.5 million from the Department of National Planning and Monitoring in 2011 for the reconstruction of the St Joseph Catholic Church in Malaguna 2, Rabaul. However, the project was never completed and it is alleged that Tokunai diverted the funds for his own personal use.

=== Current Investigations ===
Task Force Sweep is currently investigating allegations against former Prime Minister Michael Somare and his wife, Lady Veronica Somare, of misappropriation of public funds. The allegations relate to payments of PGK3.7 million paid to public and non-public officials during the hospitalisation of Somare. Many arrests are expected in the course of this investigation, including Somare's daughter Bertha and his personal assistant Seke Ua Karingal. Somare's brother, Paul, is also believed to have been involved, along with Richard Gogo, Constable John Keai and Rodney Kamus, Somare's personal aide.

In December 2011, Sam Koim announced that Task Force Sweep had uncovered a number of "syndicates" in PNG that had colluded to misappropriate large sums of public funds, which had been channelled out of the country. Sam Koim referred to Australia as "another Cayman Islands" for allowing perpetrators to launder their proceeds of crime.

At the end of 2011, Task Force Sweep was given additional funds of US$1.4 million to expand the scope of their work. They are reportedly due to investigate the Taiwan diplomatic scandal, which saw a naturalised Singaporean citizen jailed in Taiwan for his part in a cash-for-diplomacy scandal in November 2011. Wu Shih-tsa reportedly embezzled US$30 million worth of diplomatic funds in an exchange with the PNG government who was hoping to forge diplomatic ties with the government of Taiwan.

== Criticisms of Task Force Sweep ==
In January 2012, former Prime Minister Michael Somare criticised Task Force Sweep for being a tool for officials to exercise political vendettas.

In October 2011, Paul Tiensten, the former National Planning Minister applied for a Judicial Review of the decision of the National Executive Council (NEC) to establish Task Force Sweep in order to investigate allegations of corruptions at the National Planning and Monitoring Department. Tiensten's application was rejected, with costs by the NEC.

== Conclusion of Investigation ==
Sam Koim submitted Task Force Sweep's final investigation report to Prime Minister Peter O'Neill in May 2012, on the completion of Task Force Sweep's investigation into corruption and mismanagement in the public sector. The report stated that the level of corruption in Papua New Guinea had "migrated from a sporadic to a systematic and now an institutionalised form of corruption", describing Papua New Guinea as a "mobtocracy".

According to Task Force Sweep, PGK52 million has been recovered, and hopes to recover almost double that figure by the end of 2012. The report states that the balance will come from PNG Central Bank freezing PGK55 million in National Capital Ltd's bank accounts, (the issuing agent for PGK125 million of Treasury Bills for the development of projects in Kokopo which was never authorised) to be paid back to the state. Koim said 20 politicians will be referred to the ombudsman commission for further investigation, 24 public servants had been suspended for "facilitating or benefiting from corruption" and 10 lawyers will be referred to the PNG law society for investigation. In addition, a warrant has been prepared for Jeffery Nape, Speaker of the National Parliament, although has not been served.

== See also ==
- Corruption in Papua New Guinea
