= Paul Tiensten =

Paul Tiensten (born 1966) is a former Papua New Guinean politician and former National Alliance Member of Parliament for Pomio Open. Tiensten is currently serving a nine-year sentence for corruption.

Tiensten holds a bachelor's degree from the University of Papua New Guinea and a Masters in Resources Law at the Center for Energy, Petroleum, Mineral Law and Policy, University of Dundee, Scotland.

He served as a Director of Petroleum at the Department of Petroleum and Energy for the government of Papua New Guinea and was also a Project Manager for the World Bank funded Gas Development and Utilization Technical Assistance Project.

== Political career ==
Tiensten was first elected to parliament in 2002 and was appointed as the Chairman of the Special Parliamentary Committee on Gas and Energy Development. He was later appointed Trade and Industry Minister on 12 November 2003 and served as Minister of Foreign Affairs from 2005 to 2007 under then Prime Minister Michael Somare.

He was re-elected in 2007 for a second term of Parliament as Minister for National Planning and District Development, but lost his portfolio in August 2011 when a defection of MPs saw the government of Michael Somare disbanded.

== Controversy ==
=== Taiwan diplomatic scandal ===
In 2008, Singaporean businessman Wu Shih-tsa alleged in a Taiwanese court that six Papua New Guinea officials, including Paul Tiensten, personally profited from a payment of A$19 million from Taiwan in a bid to strengthen diplomatic relations with Papua New Guinea. Tiensten admitted to meeting the Taiwanese officials, but denied the allegations of corruption.

Sam Koim, the chairman of the anti-corruption investigation team Task Force Sweep, announced in December 2011 that he may be investigating the Taiwan diplomatic scandal in early 2012.

=== Kikori misappropriation controversy ===
In January 2010 Minister for Labour and Industrial Relations, Mark Maipakai, who is the member of parliament for Kikori, alleged that the Office of the Minister for National Planning and District Development had been involved in a 220 million kina (US$81.4 million) fraud, together with four landowner associations in Kikori, Gulf Province. The funds were intended for infrastructure projects in Kikori, including roads, houses and a hospital, but were never used for this purpose. Maipakai called on Paul Tiensten to explain why the funds were released by his office without proper project submission, status report, accounting or acquittals. Tiensten denied the allegations of fraud, explaining that the four landowner associations had signed the Benefits Sharing Agreement for the Liquefied Natural Gas project, and so the Government, in return, made the commitment to facilitate the release of infrastructure funds to them.

Subsequently the chairman of one of the four landowner associations, the Kikori Gas Pipeline Landowner Association (KGPLA), Mark Sarong, was arrested and charged with ten counts of misappropriation and ten counts of conspiracy. Sarong allegedly went behind the board of directors of the KGPLA and changed the signatories so that he could sign cashable cheques worth substantial amounts, including one cheque for K4 million. Tiensten, with the Minister of Finance, had authorised the release of 17.6 million kina [US$6.6 million] to the KGPLA. The case against Sarong was struck out by the Waigani Committal Court in August 2010 due to a lack of a police brief.

=== Tiensten’s arrest amid corruption claims ===
In early November 2011, Tiensten was arrested by the government’s Investigation Task Force Sweep, a corruption investigation task force established by Prime Minister Peter O'Neill. The charges against Tiensten related to the misappropriation of funds, conspiracy to defraud the state and abuse of office, for his part in approving a PGK 10 million payment of air subsidies to the airline company Travel Air. It was alleged that Tiensten conspired with Travel Air's owner, businessman Eremas Wartoto, to make the payment while he was National Planning Minister, despite being aware that the company was inactive. Tiensten had initially fled to Australia in September 2011 when summoned for questioning by the Investigation Task Force Sweep, but was arrested in Papua New Guinea upon his return in November.

Tiensten was later arrested in November 2011 by the Investigation Task Force Sweep on three further charges for diverting PGK 3.4 million of government funding to Tolpot Services Ltd, of which he was both a shareholder and a director.

In March 2014, he was convicted of misappropriation over 10 million kina, and sentenced to nine years of hard labour.
