= Leonard Murray =

Leonard Murray may refer to:

- Hubert Leonard Murray, Australian colonial governor
- Leonard Murray (railroad executive), American railroad executive
- Leonard W. Murray, Canadian naval officer

== See also ==
- Mount Leonard Murray, Papua New Guinea
- Len Murray, British trade union leader
