= Soroi Eoe =

Papua New Guinea politician (born 1954)

The Honourable Soroi Eoe CMG, MP
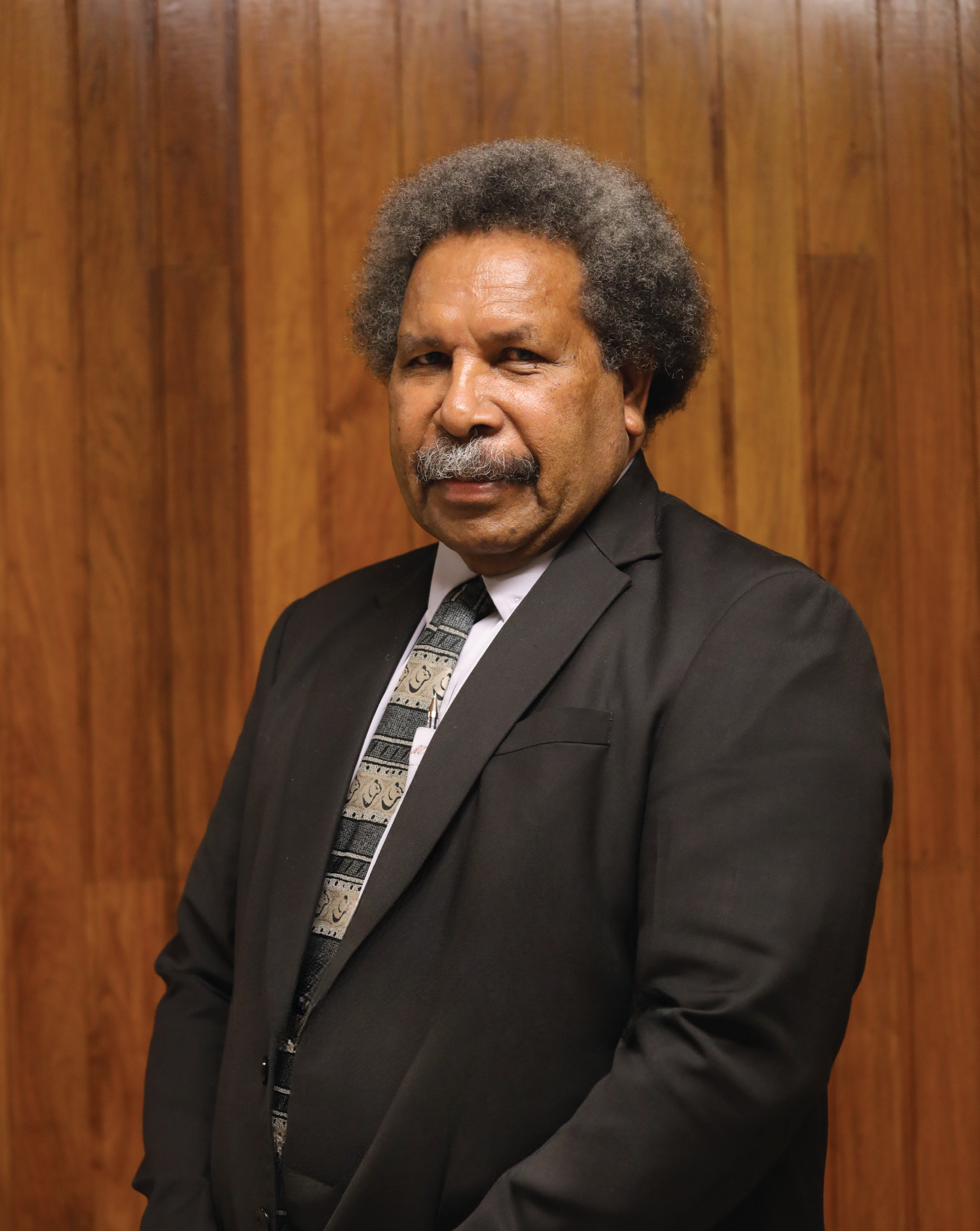
- Kikori Open MP

Minister for Provincial and Local Level Government Affairs
- Incumbent
- Assumed office 24 August 2022
- Prime Minister: James Marape
- Preceded by: Pila Niningi

Minister for Foreign Affairs and Trade
- In office 20 December 2020 – 23 August 2022
- Prime Minister: James Marape
- Preceded by: Patrick Pruaitch
- Succeeded by: Justin Tkatchenko

Minister for Public Service
- In office 8 November 2019 – 19 December 2020
- Prime Minister: James Marape
- Preceded by: Westly Nukundj
- Succeeded by: Joe Sungi

Minister for Foreign Affairs and Trade
- In office 7 June 2019 – 8 November 2019
- Prime Minister: James Marape
- Preceded by: Rimbink Pato
- Succeeded by: Patrick Pruaitch

Minister for Community Development, Youth and Religion
- In office 9 August 2017 – 31 May 2019
- Prime Minister: Peter O'Neill
- Preceded by: Delilah Gore
- Succeeded by: Wake Goi

Member of the National Parliament of Papua New Guinea
- Incumbent
- Assumed office 2017
- Constituency: Kikori Open

Personal details
- Born: 24 December 1954 Kwato Island (Milne Bay), Territory of Papua
- Party: Pangu Pati (2019-2022, 2022-2027)
- Other political affiliations: People's Progress Party (2007), Independent (2012, 2017), People's National Congress (2017–2019)
- Education: University of Papua New Guinea

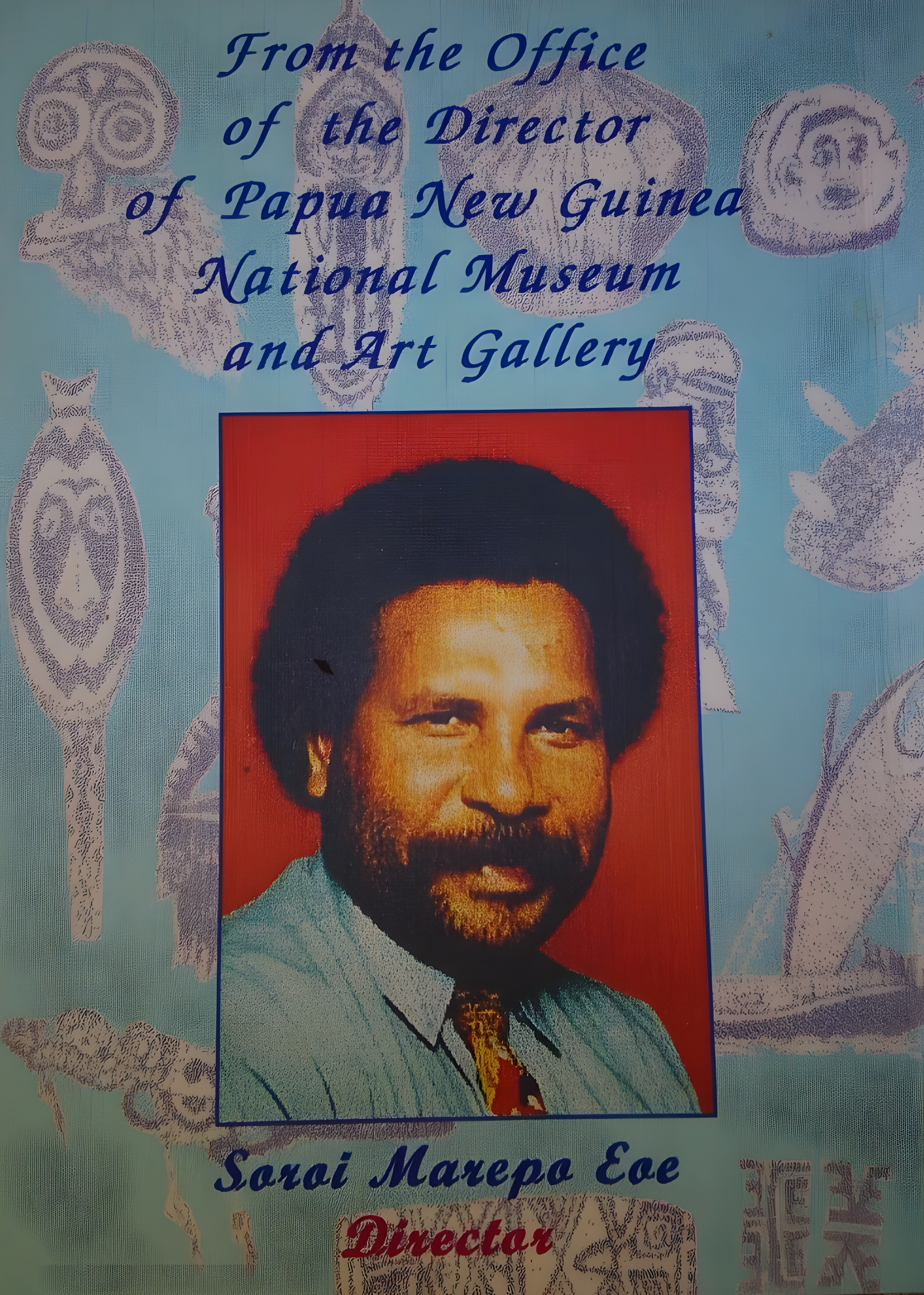
Soroi Marepo Eoe - Director of the PNG National Museum and Art Gallery, November 1996

Soroi Marepo Eoe CMG (born 24 December 1954) is a Papua New Guinea politician. He has been a Member of the Papua New Guinea National Parliament since 2017, representing the electorate of Kikori Open. On 7 June 2019, he was appointed Minister for Foreign Affairs and Trade and held the position for five months before being replaced, and later returning to the same position on 20 December 2020 serving until 23 August 2022. He was later appointed as Minister for Provincial and Local Level Government Affairs on 24 August 2022 following the formation of the Marape-Rosso Cabinet after the 2022 National General Elections. He is the Southern Region Leader of the Pangu Pati since 11 August 2022.

== Early life ==
He began his education at Arehava-Harevavo Primary School in the Gulf, completing Grades 1–4 (1964–1967), and continued with Grades 5–6 at Menyamya Lutheran and Lablab Primary Schools in Morobe (1968–1969). He then attended Bumayong Lutheran High School in Morobe for Grades 7–10 (1970–1973) before going on to study at the University of Papua New Guinea (1974–1978), where he graduated in June 1978 with a Bachelor of Arts Degree in Social Anthropology and a minor in Economics.

He served in the public service for 30 years, with 27 of those years spent in various capacities within the Papua New Guinea National Museum and Art Gallery, including as Assistant Research Officer in the Department of Anthropology from June 1978 to 1979 and as Assistant Curator of Anthropology from 1980 to 1981. He served as Associate Curator of Anthropology from 1982 to 1983 and as Curator of Anthropology from 1984 to 1985. In April 1985, he was appointed through a promotional transfer to Acting Head of the National Cultural Council (now National Cultural Commission) before being appointed Director of the Papua New Guinea National Museum and Art Gallery later that year, serving in this role for 20 years from August 1985 to June 2005. He was also appointed as the Managing Director of the Gulf Investment Trust Fund, the business arm of the Gulf Provincial Government, during the tenure of the Kavo Administration from 2008 to March 2012.

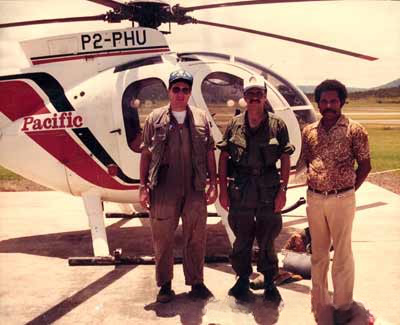
(L to R) Ken Fields, Bruce Hoy and Soroi Eoe (PNG Museum, Director) - March 15, 1986 Trip To Swamp Ghost

Prior to being elected to the National Parliament, he was a subsistence farmer.

== Personal life ==
Eoe was born on Christmas Eve on 24 December 1954 at Kwato Mission Hospital (Milne Bay), Territory of Papua. He is a United Church Christian.

== Political Past and the Court of Disputed Returns ==
Eoe first contested for the Kikori Open Seat in the 2007 National General Elections as a People's Progress Party (PPP) candidate when the new Limited Preferential Voting (LPV) system was first introduced. Leading throughout the first preferential count, he narrowly lost by 35 votes to incumbent Mark Maipakai of the National Alliance Party (NAP) at the conclusion of all preferential counts. He challenged the results at the Court of Disputed Returns, alleging foul play and election irregularities, but withdrew the election petition due to funding constraints.

In 2012, he contested again as an Independent candidate, narrowly losing to Maipakai by 343 votes. He disputed the results at the Court of Disputed Returns; however, his election petition was dismissed by the National Court for incompetence. An appeal to the Supreme Court to reverse this decision was also rejected in April 2013.

== Political career ==
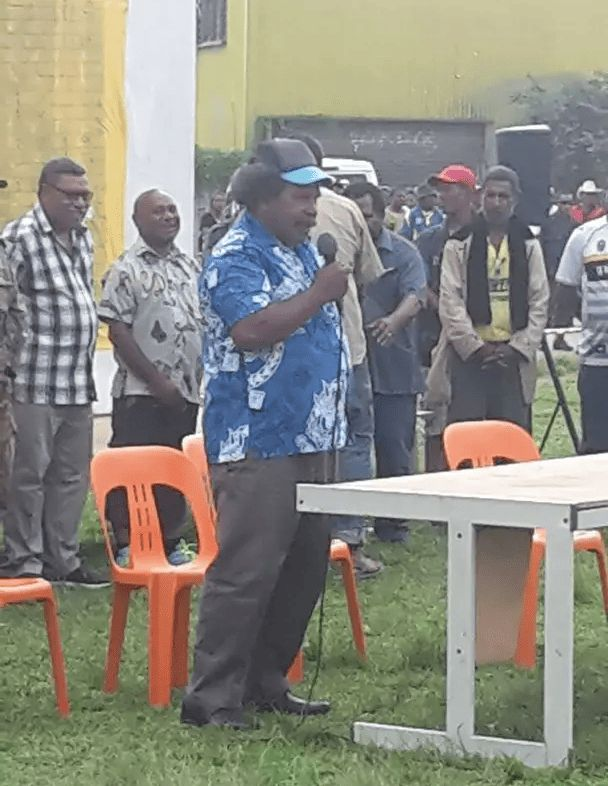
Kikori Open new Member-elect Soroi Marepo Eoe giving his maiden speech after his declaration 25/07/2017.

He was first elected to the 10th National Parliament in the 2017 National General Elections for the Kikori Open Seat as an Independent candidate. Following his election, he joined the People's National Congress. He was then appointed Minister for Community Development, Youth and Religion in the O'Neill-Abel Cabinet.

After nearly 45 years since the first General Elections held in 1972, the Kikori Open Seat had consistently been represented by incumbents from West Kikori, Baimuru, and East Kikori LLGs. Eoe is the first ever representative from the Ihu LLG to win the Kikori Open Seat.

During APEC 2018, Eoe as Minister for Community Development, Women, Youth, and Religion, hosted a Public Private Dialogue on Women and the Economy.

On 7 June 2019, he was appointed Minister for Foreign Affairs and Trade in the First Marape Cabinet. On September 27, 2019, he addressed the 74th UN General Assembly on behalf of Prime Minister James Marape. Eoe presented the "Take Back Papua New Guinea" initiative, highlighting progress in free education and healthcare. He reaffirmed the nation’s commitment to sustainable development and announced plans for a voluntary national review of the 2030 Agenda in 2020. Patrick Pruaitch replaced him in the Second Marape Cabinet on 8 November 2019. Following the Cabinet reshuffle, Eoe was appointed as Minister for Public Service in the Second Marape Cabinet on 8 November 2019 and served until 19 December 2020.

On 20 December 2020, Eoe again replaced Pruaitch as Minister for Foreign Affairs and Trade, serving until 23 August 2022. He was succeeded by Justin Tkatchenko as Minister for Foreign Affairs in the Marape-Rosso Cabinet.

== Acting Prime Minister and Acting Governor-General Appointments ==
Eoe has been entrusted and appointed as Acting Prime Minister and Acting Governor-General on different occasions by Cabinet during the Marape Governments tenure, serving in these capacities during the absence of the incumbents while fulfilling his duties as a Senior Cabinet Minister.

== Honours ==
Eoe was appointed as a Companion of the Order of St Michael and St George in the 2025 New Year Honours for his political and public service.
