= Kikori Gas Pipeline Landowner Association =

Papua New Guinea landowner association

The Kikori Gas Pipeline Landowner Association (KGPLA) is a Papua New Guinea landowner association which received PGK 17.6 million [$6.5 million] in funding in 2009 and 2010 from the government for local infrastructure developments in Kikori, Gulf Province, as part of the benefits the country is receiving from ExxonMobil’s $16 billion Liquefied Natural Gas (LNG) Project in Hides.

== Background ==
Kikori was first a location for an oil pipeline in 1992, when the country’s first oil was pumped by Chevron from the oilfields around Lake Kutubu, via a 266 kilometre pipeline along the Kikori River to the Gulf of Papua. A new gas pipeline is being constructed to serve the LNG Project, which is due for completion in 2014. The gas pipeline is following the existing oil pipeline route through the Kikori River Basin to the Omati River Landfall, then sub-sea to a processing plant near Port Moresby.

In May 2009 the government negotiated with landowner groups from the areas impacted by the LNG Project, and signed with them the Umbrella Benefits Sharing Agreement (UBSA), whereby the government agreed to share the benefits of the LNG Project revenue streams with the landowners. Following the signing of the UBSA, infighting broke out among landowners, as questions were raised about whether some landowners seeking infrastructure funding were entitled to the funding, as they were not impacted by the LNG Project.

== Promised Infrastructure Developments ==
In November 2008 the Chairman of the KGPLA, Mark Sarong, announced plans to set up a PGK25.3 million [$10 million] helicopter flying school in Kikori to be run by KGPLA’s business arm, Gulf Air Limited, after the KGPLA signed a contract with Australian firm Webb Helicopters. The agreement was also to provide transportation services in the locality. Sarong also promised a set of infrastructure projects totalling more than PGK200 million in value.

In November 2009 Mark Sarong made several public statements to the people of Kikori promising numerous infrastructure benefits. Sarong spoke of building mobile phone towers to provide greater telecommunication connectivity for locals, a PGK2 million KGPLA housing estate, a PGK3 million KGPLA marine livelihood project, and a PGK12 million road project in Kaiam. The government had recently released PGK8.6 million to the KGPLA out of the total of PGK17.6 million. Sarong also announced plans for a new Kikori township and park, an international airport and seaport, plans to support a trans-island highway, and plans to purchase fixed wing aircraft to add to Gulf Air Limited’s single helicopter operation.

== Controversies ==
=== Internal disputes ===
The KGPLA sued Mark Sarong, its Chairman, before the National Court of Justice in December 2009. The KGPLA was granted leave to move an ex parte application. In February 2010 the KGPLA sought an interim order against Sorong.

=== Fraud allegations ===
In January 2010 Minister for Labour and Industrial Relations Mark Maipakai, the member of parliament for Kikori, claimed to have uncovered a fraud amounting to PGK220 million [$84.1 million] involving Minister for National Planning and District Development Paul Tiensten, and a chairman of a landowner association in Kikori. Mark Maipakai questioned the release of funds earmarked for infrastructure projects in Kikori. The funds had been released by Paul Tiensten’s office without proper project submissions, status reports, accounting or acquittals. Maipakai alleged that the funds had been paid to four landowner associations, including the KGPLA, but the money had not been expended on any infrastructure projects.

Paul Tiensten refuted the allegations, stating that the four landowner associations had signed the UBSA with the government, by which the government undertook to facilitate the release of infrastructure funds.

In 2010 Mark Sarong was arrested and charged with misappropriation and conspiracy to defraud. Sarong was alleged to have conspired with the KGPLA accountant to fraudulently sign a Bank South Pacific cheque for a sum of PGK5,458,122 [$2.65 million]. He was released on bail of PGK5,000. However the three-month deadline given to the police to prepare the case papers elapsed, and in October 2010 the case was struck off by the Waigani magistrate’s court and the bail amount refunded to Sarong.

In March 2012 Mark Maipakai, the MP for Kikori, was suspended pending an investigation into allegations of misappropriation of public funds. Community leaders complained that during the previous two parliamentary terms, despite Kikori being a LNG Project impacted area, there were no improvements in Kikori’s roads, health services, police services, or water services, contrary to campaign promises made by Maipakai during the 2002 and 2007 elections.
