= Catherine Davani =

Papua New Guinean judge

Catherine Anne Davani (3 June 1960 – 4 November 2016) was a Papua New Guinean judge. She was the first female to serve as a judge of the Supreme Court of Papua New Guinea from 2001 until her death.

Davani was born in Wau in Morobe Province, but later lived at Dorom in Rigo District of Central Province. She studied at Kerevat National High School near Rabaul and the University of Papua New Guinea before completing the Legal Training Institute course in 1984. Davani was admitted as a lawyer in November 1984, and she worked in the civil section of the Public Solicitors' Office until 1987. She studied in Australia from 1987 to 1988, obtaining a masters in law from the University of Sydney, before returning to Port Moresby to work for Namaliu & Co Lawyers. She subsequently worked for Gadens Ridgeway Lawyers from 1991 to 1994, Shepherds Lawyers from 1994 to 2000 and Blake Dawson Waldron from 2000 until her 2001 appointment to the judiciary. She was a member of the Lawyers Statutory Committee (1995–2001) and the Papua New Guinea Law Society Council (1998–2001).

Davani was heavily involved in sporting activities as well, and played soccer at a local, national and international level. She represented Papua New Guinea in three Oceania Football Confederation World Cup qualifiers, and was captain of the Papua New Guinea women's national football team in the 1994 and 1998 qualifiers. She was also a member of the Papua New Guinea Sports Commission (1993–2001), an executive member of the Papua New Guinea Football Association (1989–2004), and its vice-president (1993–1995). In 2001, she was appointed a member of the Chamber of International Arbitration for Football, and when it merged into the Court of Arbitration for Sport, she became the Papua New Guinean representative on the court.

She was married to John Davani, and they had four children. She died from cancer in November 2016 in a hospital in Brisbane, Australia, with the funeral and a ceremonial Supreme Court sitting being held in Port Moresby on 14 November.
