= Kerevat National High School =

School in East New Britain Province, Papua New Guinea

Location
- P.O. Box 922, Rabaul, Papua New Guinea; Kerevat, East New Britain Province; Papua New Guinea; 4.354°S 152.046°E

Information
- Religious affiliation: None
- Established: 1947
- Staff: 50
- Gender: Coeducational 11th and 12th grades
- Enrolment: 800
- Publication: Kokomo

Kerevat National High School, more recently known as the Kerevat National School of Excellence, is a government high school in the East New Britain Province of Papua New Guinea (PNG) that takes admissions from throughout PNG for Grades 11 and 12. It was founded in 1947.

== Description ==
The school is located on the Gazelle Peninsula in East New Britain. It was the first high school in the Territory of New Guinea, beginning life as an institute for the training of teachers. It is a boarding school and has a student population of up to 800 and a teaching staff of about 50. About 50–60% of its students come from the Islands Region of the country, with the rest from the mainland provinces. The school offers the following subjects: language and literature; applied English; general and advanced mathematics; chemistry; biology; physics; applied science; geology; economics; accounting; business studies; legal studies; history; geography; and information and communication technology (ICT).

== Controversy ==
In 1981 there were riots at the school, which led to intervention by armed police. The reasons for the riots were complex but included the sacking of three expatriate teachers who had complained about the quality of school inspections and the fact that the school inspector was said to be a homosexual and there were allegations of a homosexual ring in the school that involved staff of the Department of Education, teachers and some students. At that time, homosexuality was illegal in Papua New Guinea. The arrest of hundreds of students on criminal charges and temporary closure of the school attracted national and international media attention. The PNG Ombudsman Commission conducted an extensive investigation into the surrounding circumstances and presented a special report to the PNG Parliament in November 1981. The school inspector resigned and left the country before that report was presented. The report’s recommendations included new contracts for the sacked teachers, termination of a Department of Education Superintendent and that police should not carry arms onto a school campus. Initial cases against students, who stated that their boycott of classes had been peaceful until the police arrived, failed in court. All further charges were then withdrawn. The Superintendent’s contract was terminated in April 1982. Several other cases of homosexual transgression against students were reported in local media during 1982, most notably the flight and arrest of an expatriate headmaster of a Highlands high school. A government directive establishing a new code of moral conduct for teachers, to be strictly enforced, was issued in November 1982.

In 2011 the school suffered temporary closure for a variety of reasons, including alleged cult activities and satanic worship, fights and other social problems, and deteriorating school facilities, together with allegations of misuse of funds for their rehabilitation, with particular allegations being made about the businessman, Eremas Wartoto.

In January 2022, local landowners briefly closed down the school. They were protesting that the land for the school had been taken illegally in 1947, without compensation and that since that time the school had taken water without payment. Although the school reopened, the issue of compensation remained unresolved.

== Former students ==
- Bernard Narokobi, politician, author and diplomat
- Cherubim Dambui, politician and Roman Catholic bishop
- Robert Atiyafa, member of parliament, government minister and former premier of Eastern Highlands Province
- Catherine Davani, judge of the Supreme Court of Papua New Guinea
- Rona Nadile, anti-corruption whistleblower
