= Madang Open =

Madang Open Madang
- Flag
- Province: Madang

Government
  - Member: Bryan Jared Kramer 2017 -

Population (2011 census)
  - Total: 75,000
- Time zone: UTC+10 (AEST)
- HDI (2018): 0.545 low · 13th of 22

Madang Open is a District in Madang Province on the northern coast of mainland Papua New Guinea. Madang is known for the beauty of its ocean location. There are a large number of distinct languages spoken in the capital, Madang Town, which draws its population from Madang Province, Morobe Province and the highlands.

== Members of the National Parliament ==
Madang Open is represented by a Member of the National Parliament.

Parliament	Member
1975 - 1977	Angmai Bilas
1977 - 1982	Aksim Siming
1982 - 1987	Aksim Siming
1987 - 1992	Paul Kamod
1992 - 1997	Stanley Pil
1997 - 2002	Jacob Wama
2002 - 2007	Alois Kingsley
2007 - 2012	Buka Malai
2012 - 2017	Nixon Duban
2017 - 2022	Bryan Jared Kramer
