= Ruby Zarriga =

Papua New Guinean civil servant

Ruby Zarriga is a retired civil servant from Papua New Guinea.

She was born in New Hanover, in the New Ireland Province. She completed a bachelor of arts degree in social work from the University of Papua New Guinea in 1987, and on graduating joined the public service. She worked in a variety of government agencies covering welfare, community planning and training. In 2004 she received an Australian Development Scholarship and in 2005 and 2006 she studied at the Australian National University in Canberra, Australia. She completed a master's degree in management and returned to Papua New Guinea to the Department of National Planning and Monitoring. She was appointed First Assistant Secretary, Sectoral Planning and Programming Division.

In September 2011, Zarriga was arrested and charged with conspiracy to defraud the State. The arrest was in relation to a K10 million grant that was paid by the Department of National Planning to Kokopo businessman, Eremas Wartoto, to set up an airline, at the time that Zarriga was acting secretary.

Zarriga retired in 2021 after working in the Department of National Planning and Monitoring for 32 years.

== Personal life ==
Zarriga was married to Reverend Megghen Zarriga, who was shot and killed in 2002. The couple had two daughters together.
