= Lamana Hotel =

Hotel in Port Moresby, Papua New Guinea

- Location within Papua New Guinea

General information
- Location: Port Moresby, Papua New Guinea
- Coordinates: 9°26′35″S 147°10′45″E

Other information
- Number of rooms: 60

Lamana Hotel is a hotel in Waigani, Port Moresby, Papua New Guinea, located near the Sir John Guise Stadium. The hotel has 60 rooms and is an important conference centre, and has hosted attendments of the 19th Conference of the Pacific Power Association.
