= List of museums in Papua New Guinea =

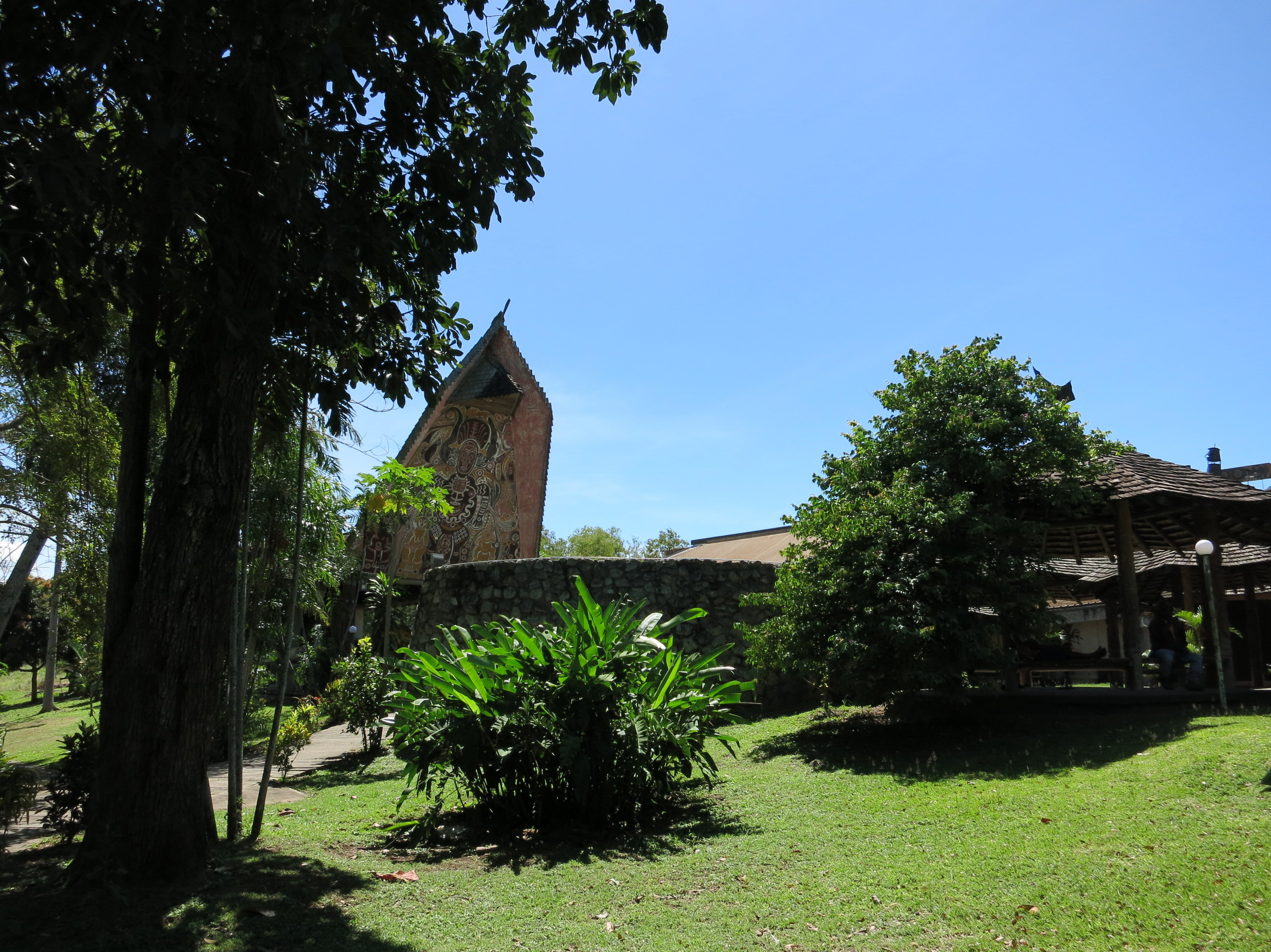
The entrance to the Papua New Guinea National Museum and Art Gallery

This is a list of museums in Papua New Guinea.

- Papua New Guinea National Museum and Art Gallery
- Madang Museum
- J. K. MacCarthy Museum

== See also ==
- List of museums
