= Patrick Pruaitch =

Papua New Guinean politician

The Honourable Patrick Pruaitch CMG MP

Minister for Foreign Affairs and Trade
- In office 11 August 2019 – 20 December 2020
- Prime Minister: James Marape
- Preceded by: Soroi Eoe
- Succeeded by: Soroi Eoe

Member of the National Parliament of Papua New Guinea
- In office 2002–2022
- Constituency: Aitape-Lumi Open

Personal details
- Born: 29 June 1964 (age 62) Sandaun Province
- Party: National Alliance Party (2002–2022)
- Other political affiliations: Independent (2002)
- Education: University of Papua New Guinea

Patrick Pruaitch, CMG (/ˈpruːaɪtʃ/; born 29 June 1964) is a Papua New Guinea politician who represented the Aitape-Lumi constituency in the West Sepik Province of Papua New Guinea in the National Parliament of Papua New Guinea from 2002 to 2022. He was a Cabinet Minister with few interruptions from 2002–2010 and from 2012–2017. From November 2019–November 2020, he was Minister for Foreign Affairs. From 2017–2019 and 2020-2022 he was Leader of the Opposition. He was twice – in 2019 and 2020 – alternate PM in unsuccessful attempts to unseat the government.

== Early life ==
Pruaitch was born in the Sandaun (West Sepik) Province of Papua New Guinea. He was educated at St. Vincent de Paul Primary School, St Ignatius High School, and Sogeri National High School. He received a bachelor's degree in Economics from the University of Papua New Guinea.

He was employed by SP Holdings for 10 years, and then moved to Shell in 1998 until his resignation to run in the 2002 elections.

== Political career ==
Pruaitch is an important politician within the PNG context, firstly because he is a longstanding MP in a parliament where turnover during elections is high and secondly because he has been close to power as a member of the Cabinet from 2002–2010 and from 2012–2017. He was Minister of Foreign Affairs for one year in the Marape Cabinet from November 2019–November 2020. Thirdly, he became the leader of the National Alliance Party after Michael Somare left the party in 2012. He has belonged to this party since 2002. Under his leadership, the National Alliance Party was revived after a big election defeat in 2012 (having won six seats) to being the second-biggest party after the 2017 election (having won 13 seats). In the context of PNG politics it is unusual that politicians remain in the same party and that a party is relatively stable over long periods.

Pruaitch was first elected to the national parliament in the 2002 elections as an independent MP. He joined the National Alliance Party, which was then-Prime Minister Sir Michael Somare's party. He regularly acted in important capacities but his most important posts were at the Finance and Treasury portfolios. He was appointed Minister for Forestry on 13 August 2002. In May 2004 he also became Leader of Government Business, and then Minister for Lands and Physical Planning in August 2004. Following the resignation of Arthur Somare as Minister of State in March 2006, he became Minister for National Planning and Monitoring and from April also Minister of Finance. In June 2006 he lost his cabinet positions in a reshuffle. He came back to Parliament after being re-elected in 2007 and was made Minister of Treasury and Finance in the Somare/Temu government. He combined this post with Forestry for three months, until August 2007. In June 2010, he was suspended from his Parliamentary seat due to allegations of misconduct in 2008: irregularities in expense accounts and misuse of District Development Funds The procedure to bring him before a Leadership Tribunal was still underway in December 2019, when his last appeal against the procedure was dismissed. Despite these accusations he was appointed to the caretaker cabinet of Sam Abal when Michael Somare was in hospital in 2011. However, he was only in that office a few months because the new government of Peter O'Neill deposed the Abal Government during the 2011–12 Papua New Guinean constitutional crisis. Pruaitch was again elected as a Member of Parliament in 2012 despite the accusations of misuse of office, and was appointed Minister of Forestry and Climate Change by Prime Minister Peter O'Neill after the elections. In March 2014, he became Minister of the Treasury. Following the 2017 general election, he led the coalition of parliamentary opposition parties against Peter O'Neill's government. He lost his seat in the 2022 elections.

== The succession of Peter O'Neill and Pruaitch ==
In early April 2017, Pruaitch publicly criticised his own government's management of the economy at a party meeting of the National Alliance Party. He was then formally still in the Cabinet as Treasurer. He stressed the rapid growth of the national debt and the fall of government revenue. He doubted Peter O'Neill's willingness to curb public spending at a time when public debt was increasing. Early in May, he accused O'Neill of not providing sufficient funding for police services in preparation for the 2017 general election. O’Neill responded after a few days stating that Pruaitch, himself as minister in his Cabinet, was responsible for the state of affairs of the economy. Pruaitch was dismissed as treasurer on 12 May 2017, but O'Neill offered him to remain a member of the government as a minister without a portfolio. However, Pruaitch decided to leave the coalition.

A vote of no confidence cannot be moved in PNG’s national parliament during a period of 18 months after the commencement of the term of a Prime Minister. The O’Neill/Able government therefore became vulnerable in February 2019. In November 2018, a coalition of opposition parties was formed in anticipation of a vote of no confidence. On 28 May 2019, this coalition appointed Pruaitch as nominee for Prime Minister in the Alternative Government of Papua New Guinea. He was proposed and introduced by James Marape as the unanimous choice of the opposition MPs. Marape was Minister of Finance but he defected from the O’Neill/Abel government in early April 2019. He had been declared as alternate MP before on 7 May 2019. However, he later resigned from the post after he was mentioned together with O’Neill in an Ombudsman report on the UBS loan. Pruaitch thus became the leader of that coalition, which at that point still was far short of the numbers needed to succeed. This changed after more and more MPs joined them. The defection of William Duma and his United Resources Party gave the opposition the numbers to defeat O’Neill. This was followed by another contest for the post of alternate prime minister between Marape and Pruaitch. Pruaitch won with 37 votes against 28 for Marape. Afterward, Marape proposed Pruaitch as the prime ministerial candidate of the opposition; the expectation was that the vote of no confidence would go ahead with Pruaitch as alternate PM.

O’Neill then avoided a vote of no confidence by resigning as prime minister, which created an opening filled by Marape, who, together with 28 MPs, rejoined PNC (O’Neill’s party that he had left before). Marape was then elected as PM by an overwhelming majority of MPs: 109 out of 111 votes. Pruaitch initially reacted with a proposal to nominate Peter O”Neill. O’Neill’s nomination was, however, withdrawn before the vote. Pruaitch protested against the procedure installing Marape as PM and opened a court case four months after the election in August 2019 as he considered the succession illegal. However, in September he withdrew the court case after he left the opposition and joined the government coalition.

In November, Marape appointed Pruaitch Minister of Foreign Affairs. In July 2020, a leadership tribunal against Pruaitch revived accusations of misconduct dating from two decades prior. Most cases were dismissed in early October. The remaining cases were minor and decided. This ended a situation where Pruaitch was active in office while he was supposed to be suspended.

This is relevant as the accusations could no longer be levelled against him in the next sequence of events. On 14 November 2020, Pruaitch joined a group of 13 Ministers in a "camp" of MPs meeting in Vanimo – the constituency of Belden Namah, leader of the opposition – planning a vote of no confidence in the Marape government. Patrick Pruaitch was selected as the alternate PM in a contest with Sam Basil: 27 votes against 24, with 4 abstentions. Marape congratulated Pruaitch. After a court case, they succeeded in tabling this motion on 15 December with confidence in a majority. They had a slim majority: the government claimed to have 55 MPs behind them. However, the move to unseat Marape collapsed when 18 MPs – among whom Sam Basil – rejoined the government side when entering the chamber giving the government support of 90 members out of the 111 seat parliament.

The National Alliance Party had split during the attempt to mount a vote of no confidence as some of their MPs remained loyal to Marape. Pruaitch rejoined those loyal members, along with the other MPs who had supported the vote of no confidence. They therefore supported again the Marape government. Pruaitch lost his seat in the 2022 election.
