= Minister for Foreign Affairs (Papua New Guinea) =

Position for cabinet minister

Minister for Foreign Affairs and Trade of Papua New Guinea
- Emblem of Papua New Guinea

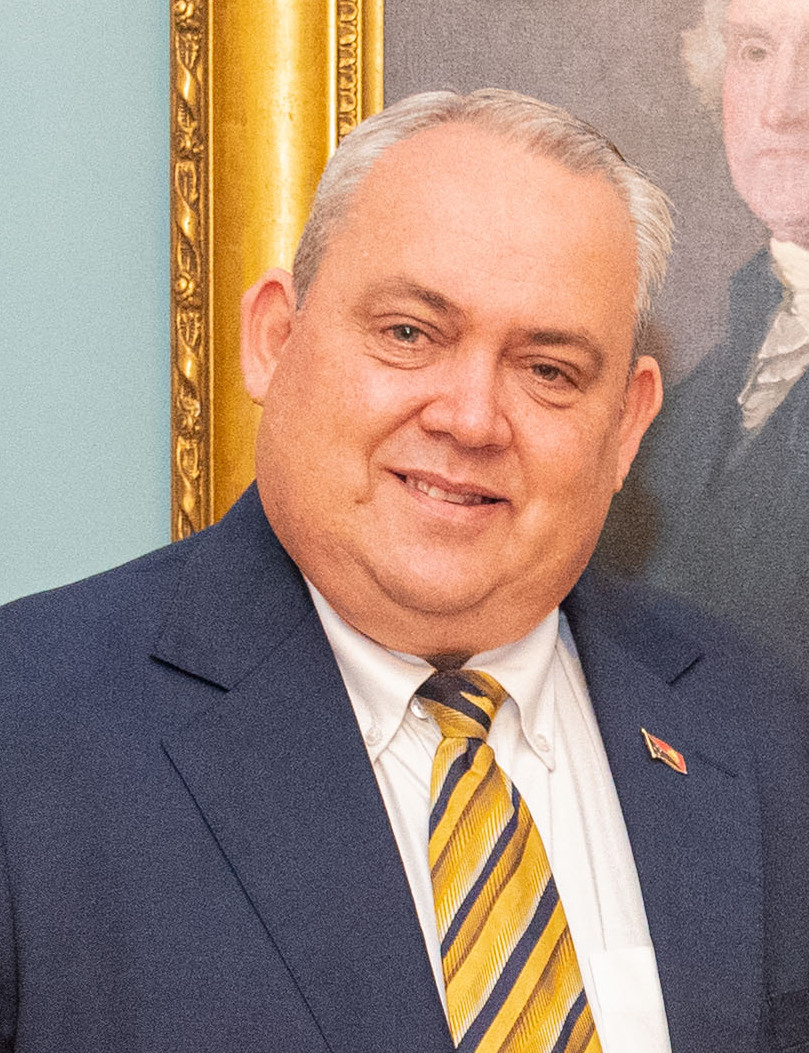
- Incumbent; Justin Tkatchenko since 18 January 2024
- Style: The Honourable
- Appointer: Governor-General on the recommendation of the Prime Minister
- Inaugural holder: Albert Maori Kiki
- Formation: 16 September 1975

The Minister for Foreign Affairs is a cabinet minister in Papua New Guinea who is responsible for the Department of Foreign Affairs and Trade. In recent years, the Foreign Affairs portfolio has been increasingly tied to the Trade portfolio, and as such recent ministers are generally known as the Minister for Foreign Affairs and Trade.

== List of foreign ministers of Papua New Guinea (1975–present) ==
- 1975–1977: Sir Albert Maori Kiki
- 1977–1980: Ebia Olewale
- 1980............ Tony Ila
- 1980–1982: Noel Levi
- 1982–1984: Rabbie Namaliu
- 1984–1985: John Giheno
- 1985–1986: Legu Vagi
- 1986–1987: Ted Diro
- 1987............ Aruru Matiabe (acting)
- 1987............ Paias Wingti (acting)
- 1987–1988: Akoka Doi
- 1988............ Paias Wingti
- 1988–1992: Michael Somare (from 1990, Sir Michael Somare)
- 1992–1994: John Kaputin
- 1994–1996: Sir Julius Chan
- 1996–1997: Kilroy Genia
- 1997............ Chris Haiveta
- 1997–1999: Roy Yaki
- 1999............ Sir Michael Somare
- 1999–2000: Sir John Kaputin
- 2000............ Sir Michael Somare
- 2000–2001: Bart Philemon
- 2001............ John Pundari
- 2001–2002: John Waiko
- 2002–2006: Sir Rabbie Namaliu
- 2006............ Sir Michael Somare
- 2006–2007: Paul Tiensten
- 2007–2010: Sam Abal
- 2010–2011: Don Polye
- 2011–2012: Ano Pala (O'Neill government)
- 2011–2012: Paru Aihi (Somare government)
- 2012............ Sir Puka Temu
- 2012–2019: Rimbink Pato
- 2019............ Soroi Eoe
- 2019–2020: Patrick Pruaitch
- 2020–2022: Soroi Eoe
- 2022–2023: Justin Tkatchenko
- 2023–2024: James Marape
- 2024-present: Justin Tkatchenko

== Sources ==
- Rulers.org – Foreign ministers L–R
