= Rimbink Pato =

Papua New Guinea politician

The Honourable Rimbink Pato MP
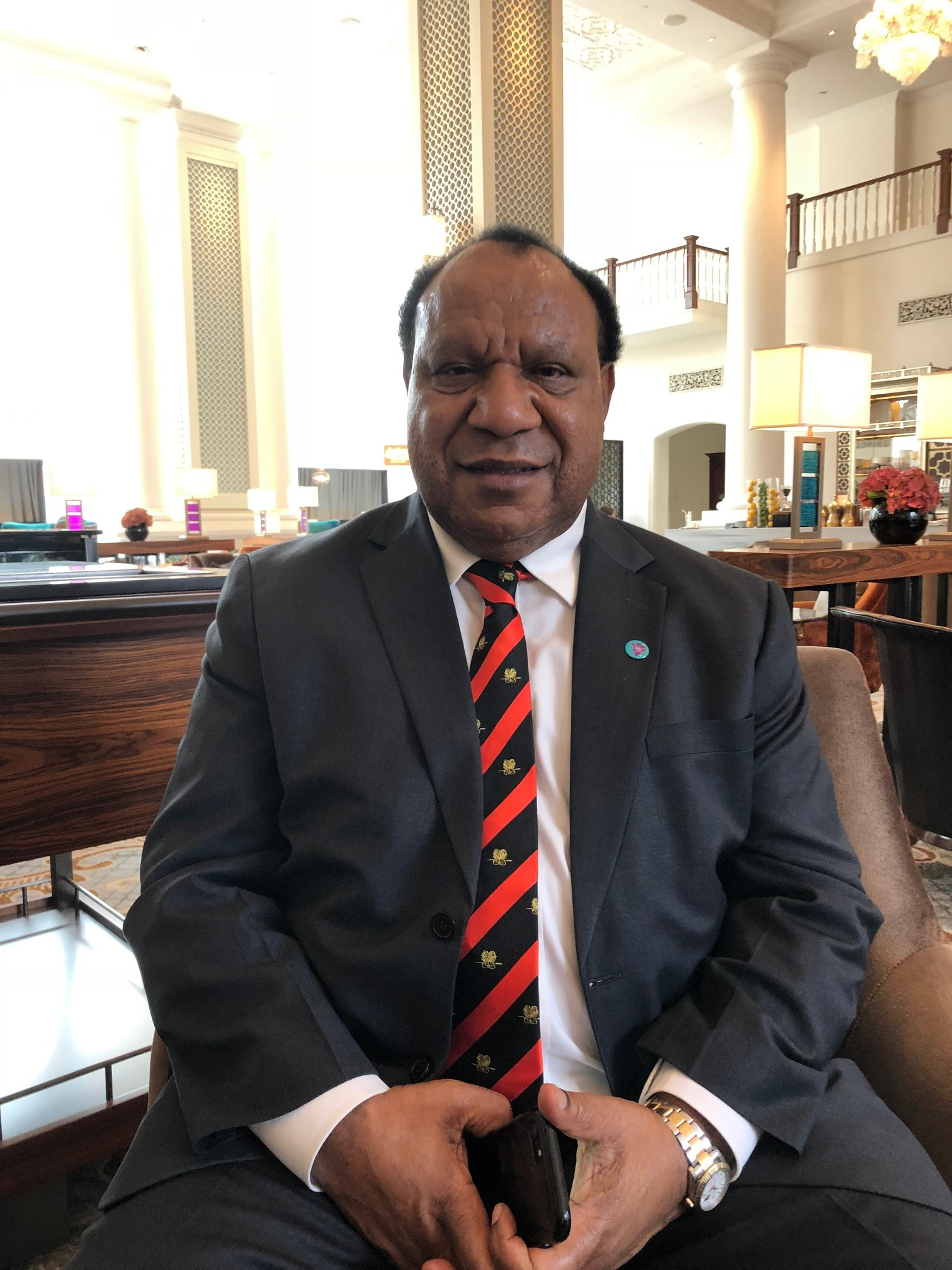
- Pato in 2018

Minister for Foreign Affairs and Trade
- In office 9 August 2012 – 31 May 2019
- Monarch: Queen Elizabeth II
- Prime Minister: Peter O'Neill
- Preceded by: Sir Puka Temu
- Succeeded by: Soroi Eoe

Member of the National Parliament of Papua New Guinea
- Incumbent
- Assumed office 23 July 2012
- Constituency: Wapenamanda Open

Personal details
- Born: 4 May 1961 (age 65) Wapenamanda
- Party: United Party
- Spouse: Joyce Pato
- Education: University of Papua New Guinea

Rimbink Pato OBE (born 4 May 1961) is a Papua New Guinean constitutional lawyer and politician. He was Minister for Foreign Affairs and Trade from 2012 to 2019. Pato is the head of the United Party and its sole MP, representing Wapenamanda Open.

Pato was awarded an Order of British Empire (OBE) by Queen Elizabeth II in recognition of services to the community and law.

== Early life ==
Pato is from Kopya Village, Wapenamanda, Enga Province. He attended Wamapisa Primary School and Pausa Lutheran Secondary School. He graduated with a Bachelor of Laws from the University of Papua New Guinea in 1986, and then went on to the Legal Training Institute.

== Career ==
Prior to becoming a politician in 2012, Pato was a prominent practising lawyer in PNG, and was involved in significant cases. He was Managing Partner with Steeles Lawyers, which later re-established as Pato Lawyers, with Pato remaining as Managing Partner.

From 1999 to 2001, Pato was Executive Chairman and CEO of the Finance Pacific Group of companies, which included Papua New Guinea Banking Corporation Ltd, Rural Development Bank Ltd, MMI Pacific Insurance Ltd, and Motor Vehicle Insurance Trust Limited.

Pato was elected to Parliament in the 2012 general election, as MP for Wapenamanda, representing the United Party. Despite being a first time MP, Prime Minister Peter O'Neill appointed him Minister for Foreign Affairs and Immigration. He has since played prominent roles, often as chairman, in the Pacific Islands Forum (including representing the Prime Minister at the Leaders' meeting), the Melanesian Spearhead Group, and the African, Caribbean and Pacific Group of States.

Pato has also chaired and co-chaired high-level sessions at the United Nations. Pato has conducted many significant negotiations on behalf of Papua New Guinea, including on delicate topics such as the Manus Island refugee arrangements. He has met in bilateral and multilateral meetings, as well as on social occasions, with his counterpart Foreign Ministers and national leaders of other countries.

As an envoy of O’Neill, Pato has delivered the Country Statement for Papua New Guinea on several occasions at the United Nations General Assembly, most recently on 29 September 2018.

Pato held the Immigration Portfolio from 2012 to 2017. In 2017, he was reappointed as Minister for Foreign Affairs and in addition was assigned the Trade Portfolio. He attended the World Trade Organization 11th ministerial conference 2017 in Argentina as Minister for Trade.

Pato chaired the Ministerial Session of the 2018 APEC Economic Leaders Summit in Port Moresby.

As part of the First Marape Cabinet, he lost his ministerial portfolio, but was appointed Special Envoy of the Prime Minister on International Affairs, a role he still holds.

== Personal life ==
Pato is married to Joyce Pato, and they have three children.

== Honours ==
- Grand Cordon of the Order of the Rising Sun (2026)

== See also ==
- List of foreign ministers in 2017
