= Papua New Guinea National Museum and Art Gallery =

Museum in Waigani, Port Moresby, Papua New Guinea

- Established: 1977
- Location: Waigani, Port Moresby, Papua New Guinea
- Coordinates: 09°25′32.2″S 147°11′24.4″E
- Type: museum
- Website: www.museumpng.gov.pg

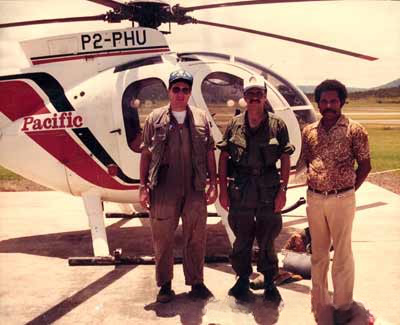
(L to R) Ken Fields, Bruce Hoy and Soroi Eoe (PNG Museum, Director) - March 15, 1986 Trip To Swamp Ghost

The Papua New Guinea National Museum and Art Gallery (NMAG) is a museum and art gallery in Waigani, Port Moresby, Papua New Guinea. It is the national museum of Papua New Guinea.

== History ==
In 1889 the British governor of Papua New Guinea, William Macgregor began a collecting programme in order to create a collection of natural history specimens and objects reflecting the uniqueness of the animals and cultures in the territory. The initial aim of the program had also been to establish a museum, however the idea did not gain traction and the collection was ultimately dispersed to a number of museums in Australia, until such a time as the country had its own museum.

Following the establishment of the Territory of Papua, the Australian administration quickly established two museums in Port Moresby. The Economic Museum established by Staniforth Smith in 1907 focused on natural history, including geological and mineralogical specimens, timber, and agricultural horticultural products. The Anthropology Museum established by Hubert Murray in 1914 focused more on ethnography with a collection centred around indigenous artefacts, many of which originated from Murray's private collection. However, its existence as a standalone museum was short-lived as a decision was made to send most of its collection to Australia by 1916 for budgetary reasons.

During the 1950s, the development of a national museum progressed: in 1953 an Antiquities Ordinance was established and a new programme of collection begun. A board of trustees for the proposed establishment of the museum was formed in 1954. The Public Museums and Art Galleries Ordinance was created in 1956 established the Papua New Guinea Public Museum and Art Gallery.

The museum collections were initially housed in disused government buildings, and in 1960 they moved to an old hospital. However progress was difficult due to a lack of specialised staff and facilities. From 1973, the government, funded in part by a grant from Australia, set out on a Cultural Development Program, which committed to the development of the museum. This was, and continues to be, in recognition of the impact that Australian colonial administration had on Papua New Guinea.

During the 1960s the museum was also charged with control of the trade in cultural artefacts, under the Papua New Guinea National Cultural Property (Preservation) Act of 1965. However this was difficult for the institution to implement for several years, due to inadequate resourcing.

An A-20 was repatriated to the museum from Australia in 2025, following the completion of the Aviation Heritage Centre. The new facility also includes a display about American ace Dick Bong.

== Architecture ==
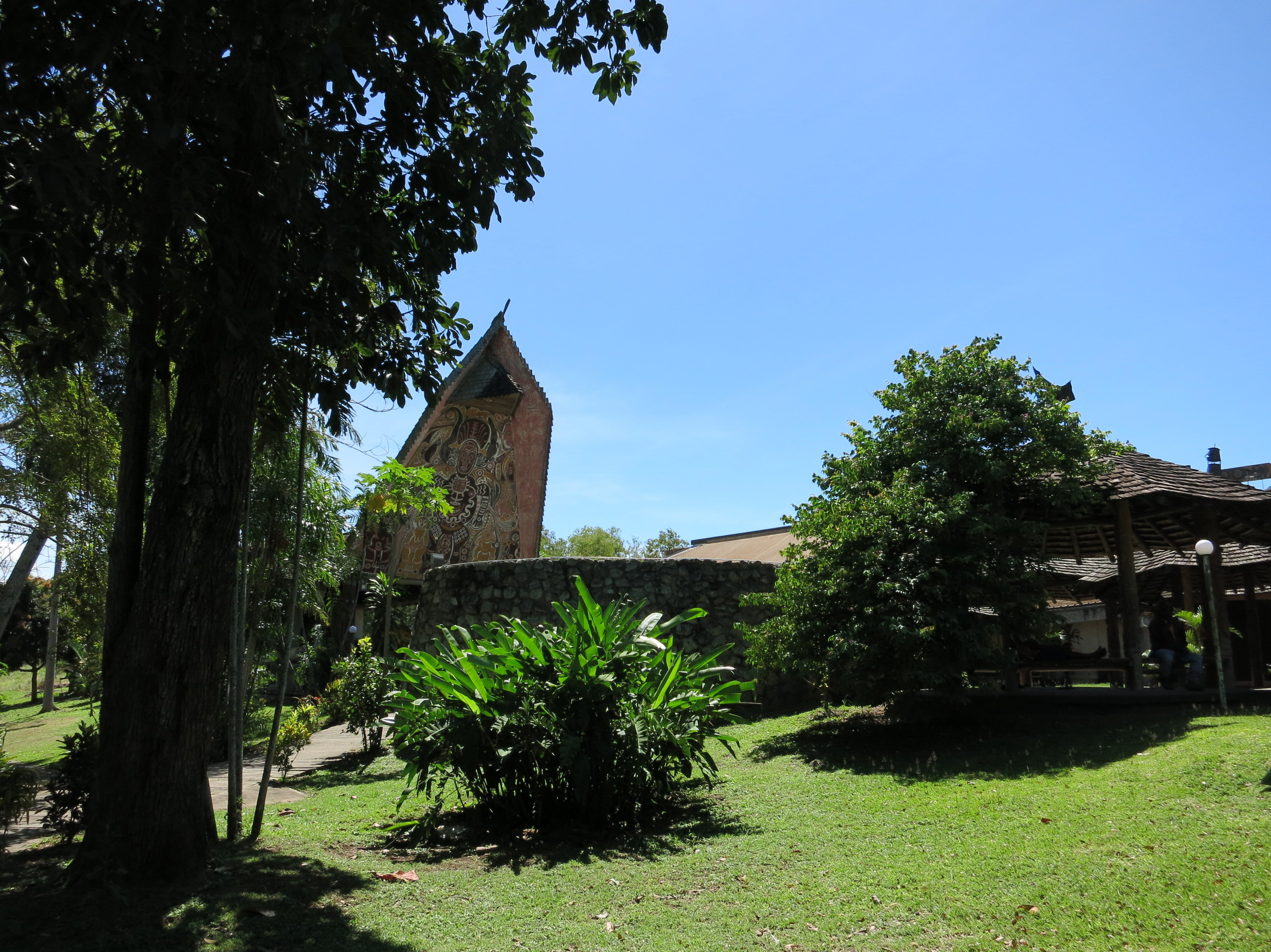
Papua New Guinea Museum, 2015

The construction of the purpose-built museum started in 1975, funded in part by the Australian government, and it was opened to the public on 27 June 1977.

=== Refurbishment in 2017 ===
Part of the museum was remodelled for its 40th anniversary in 2017. The refurbishment was led by the Australian firm Architectus. The museum officially reopened on 12 October, with a re-naming of the gallery spaces to reflect indigenous Papuan identities - the new names are: Tumbuna, Susan Karike, Bernard Narokobi, Ian Saem Majnep and Be Jijimo. Another key part of the work undertaken was to improve disability access. The work was funded through the Papua New Guinea - Australia partnership alongside staff and the NMAG Board of Trustees. New technology was embedded into the galleries, in particular in a new Second World War display.

== Collections and research ==
The museum and gallery house objects and artworks which reflect Papua New Guinea's rich indigenous cultures and societies. It considers itself a Haus Tumbuna or a place for the ancestors of the people.

The collections include objects relating to music, body adornment, ceremony - in particular kundu and garamut drums, navigation - including richly decorated a Milne Bay outrigger, masks and totem poles. There are over 50,000 ethnographic objects in the museum's collection, but despite its size there are regions and cultures that are not strongly represented.

The museum collaborated with researchers in 2019 to investigate the pottery trade in the Gulf of Papua, concluding that trade between Australia and Papua New Guinea was likely in the preceding two millennia. Staff from the museum have also visited and collaborated with the Smithsonian in order share knowledge of song traditions and ecological knowledge.

=== Repatriation ===
In 1974, Prime Minister Michael Somare wrote: “We view our masks and art as living spirits with fixed abodes. It is not right they should be stored in New York, Paris, Bonn or elsewhere.” In preparation for the opening of the new museum building, the then Director, Dirk Smidt, requested the return of items from the William Macgregor Collection, which were accessioned into the Australian Museum at that time. Seventeen objects were returned at the opening of the museum in 1977. In the 1990s, more of the Macgregor material was returned to the museum, this time as part of a partnership with Queensland Museum.

In 2020 the museum received 225 objects from the National Gallery of Australia, as part of an agreed program of repatriation. The objects were returned as part of an ongoing process of return, part of a partnership between the two institutions. The objects mostly dated to the mid-twentieth century and the group is made up of utensils, masks and sculptures, from various provinces including some parts of New Ireland, East and West New Britain, Gulf, Milne Bay and East Sepik.

=== Overseas collections ===
In part due to legacies of colonialism, many institutions overseas have collections of material culture from Papua New Guinea, including: Hood Museum; Science Museum; the British Museum; Pitt Rivers Museum; Field Museum; Museum of Archaeology and Anthropology; the Metropolitan Museum of Art, and others.

In 2006, doubt was raised over the legality of the ownership of several objects in the De Young Museum's Melanesian collection. It was claimed that nine objects were national property and, as such, should be returned to Papua New Guinea.

== Notable people ==
- Andrew Moutu – former Director, 2011 – 2016, 2018 – 2022.
- Soroi Marepo Eoe, CMG – former Director, August 1985 – June 2005.
- Geoffrey Navalagou Mosuwadoga, OBE – former Director, 1975 –
- Dirk Smidt – former Director, 1972 – 1975.

== See also ==
- Papua New Guinean art
- Culture of Papua New Guinea
- List of museums in Papua New Guinea
