= National Parliament House, Port Moresby =

Parliament building

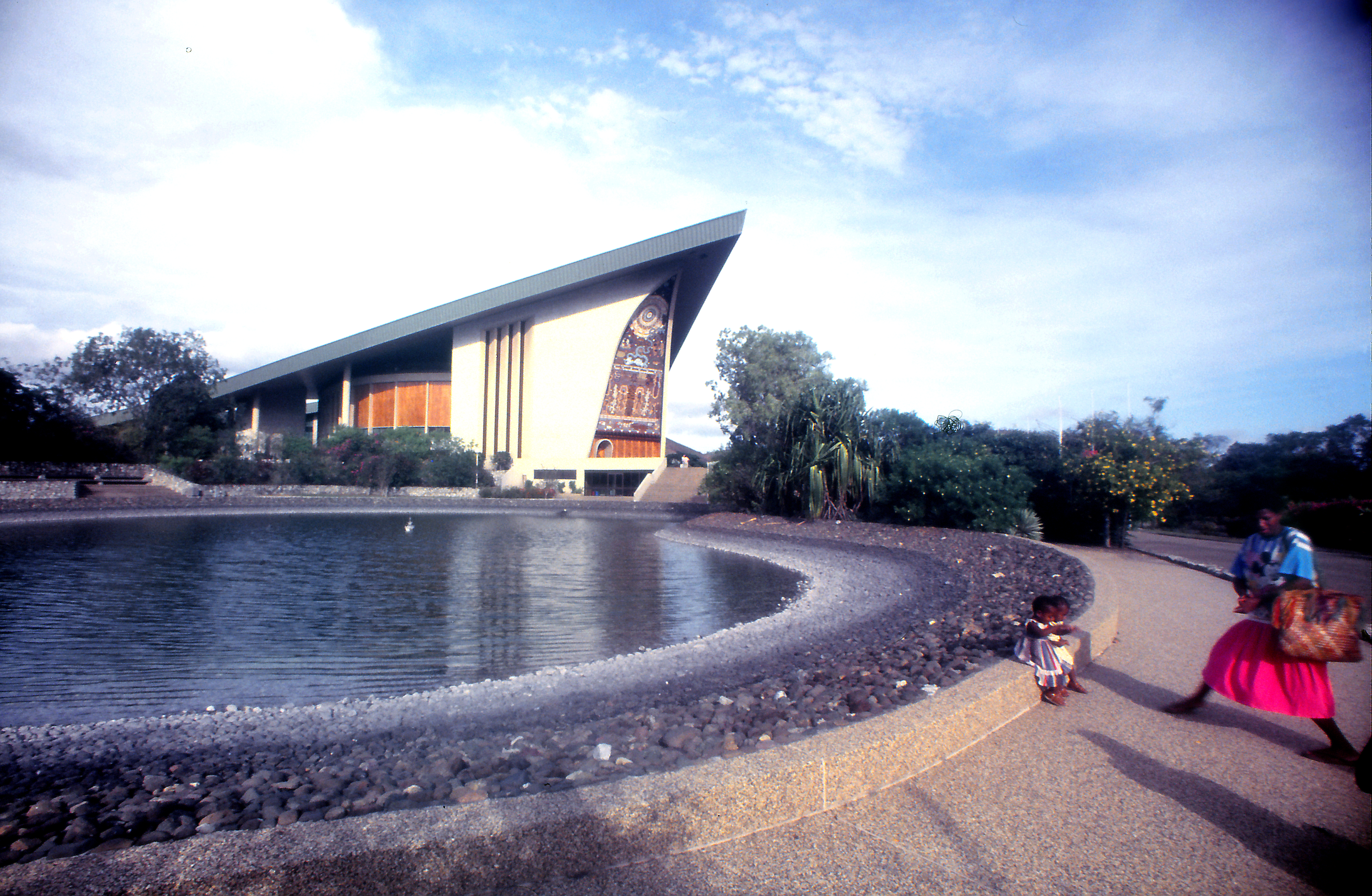
- Interactive map of the National Parliament House, Port Moresby area
- Former names: House of Assembly Building of Papua and New Guinea (1964–1975)
- Alternative names: Parliament House, Port Moresby; National Parliament Building, Port Moresby

General information
- Location: P.O. Parliament House, Waigani, Port Moresby, National Capital District, Papua New Guinea
- Coordinates: 9°25′41″S 147°11′30″E
- Opened: 8 August 1984
- Owner: Government of Papua New Guinea (since 1975); Government of Australia (1964–1975)

Height
- Architectural: Melanesian

Website
- parliament.gov.pg

The National Parliament House, Port Moresby or the National Parliament Building in Port Moresby, Papua New Guinea, is home to the National Parliament of Papua New Guinea.

== Foundation ==
The Papua and New Guinea House of Assembly seated between 1964 and 1975 in a building in downtown Port Moresby that was previously used as a hospital. The National Parliament Building was officially opened by Prince Charles on 8 August 1984. The old building was demolished and it is currently being redeveloped as a Political History museum and library.

The National Parliament Building is adjacent to the Supreme Court Buildings.

In 2025 the Australian Government offered to fund the construction of a new ministerial wing of the National Parliament Building.
