= Waigani =

Place in National Capital District, Papua New Guinea

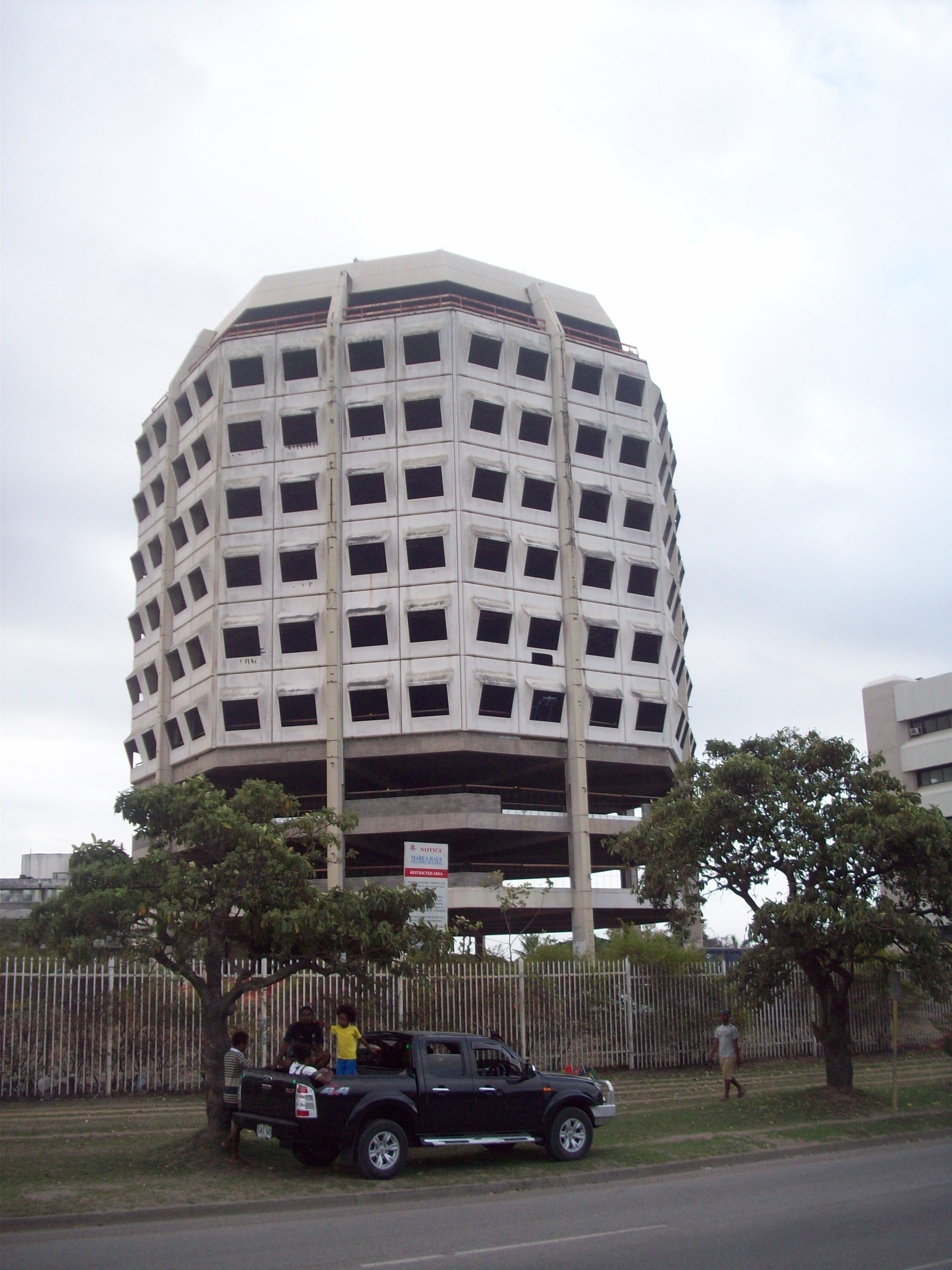
- Pineapple Building in 2013

- Location within Papua New Guinea
- Coordinates: 9°25′10″S 147°11′02″E
- Country: Papua New Guinea
- Province: NCD
- City: Port Moresby
- Time zone: UTC+10 (AEST)
- Postcode: 131

Waigani is a suburb of Port Moresby in Papua New Guinea. The suburb is the center of governance for Papua New Guinea, as it includes buildings such as the Parliament Building of Papua New Guinea, the National and Supreme Court, and City Hall. It also includes embassies and high commissions representing Australia, New Zealand, United Kingdom, Japan, Indonesia and China in Waigani.

Waigani also includes the Parliament Building of Papua New Guinea, the National and Supreme Court, the University of Papua New Guinea, Morauta House, the PNG National Museum, the National Library, and Port Moresby National Arts Theatre.

== History ==
Waigani was named after the Waigani swamp. In the modern day, the Waigani swamp is not located within Waigani, but it is nearby.

In 1942, during the Pacific War, an airbase called 5 Mile Drome or Ward's Drome was built in Waigani. It was connected to several other airbases by road. In 1943, the airbase was the busiest airfield in the Southern Hemisphere.

Following the end of the war, Ward's Drome was abandoned. For a time, the former runways were used as a raceway by locals, during which time it took on the nickname "Racecourse Road". Over time, Ward's Drome was paved over and replaced with roads. As late as the 50s, locals were scavenging scrap metal and fuel from abandoned airplanes.

Much of Ward's Drome has been paved over since the war, but as of the 21st century, some sites still exist. The cement foundations of some headquarters buildings are reported to still exist. One headquarters building still stands, although it is heavily overgrown. Some parts of Ward's Drome were later repurposed for the Port Moresby Golf Club.

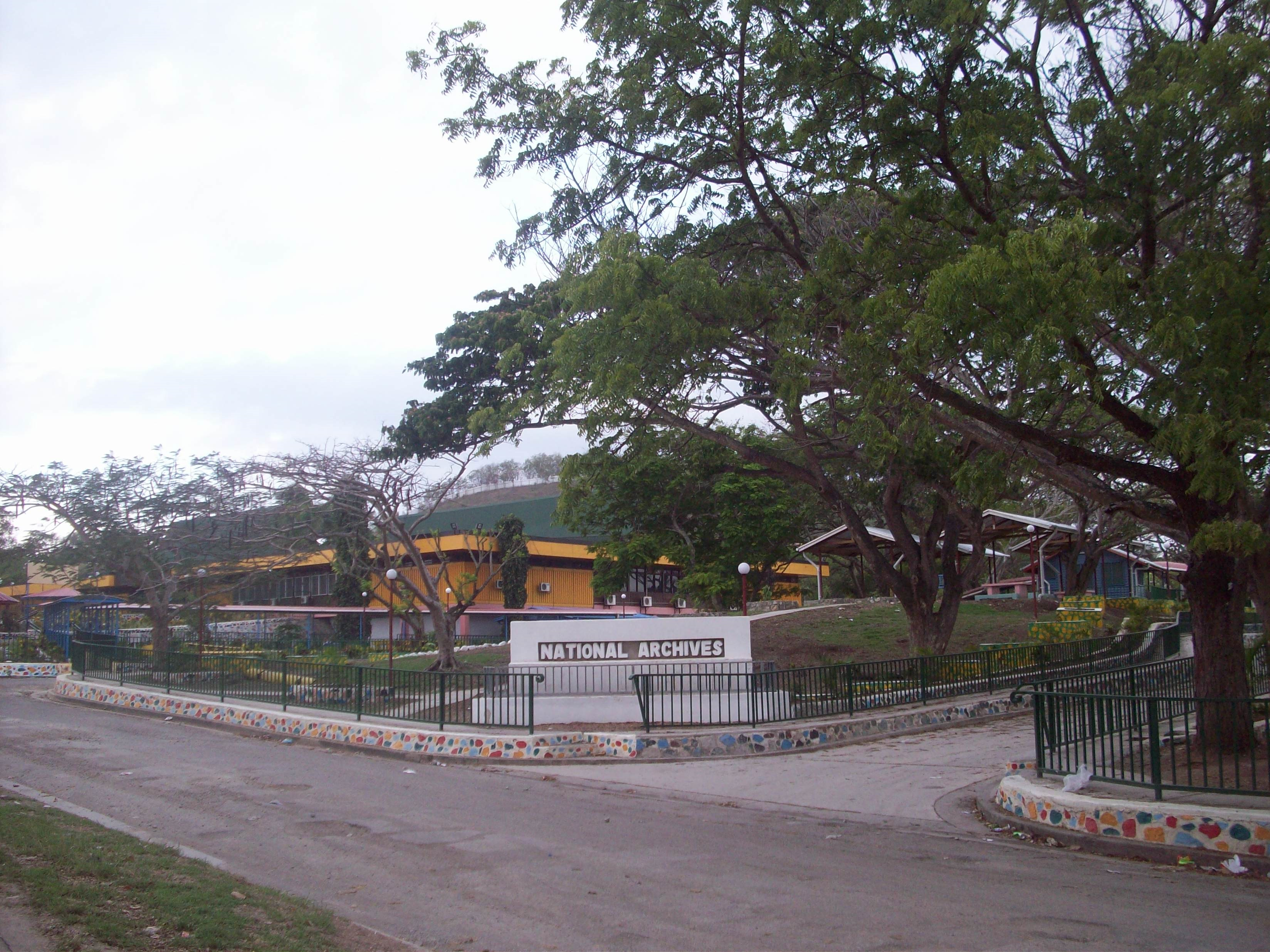
National Library and Archives, Waigani

The National Archives and Public Records Services of Papua New Guinea was established in 1957. At the time, it primarily existed for record management. It became part of the Office of Library and Archives Board in September 1993. It is the main body of the National Library of Papua New Guinea. The University of Papua New Guinea, located in Waigani, was established in 1965.

Front side of the parliament building

Port Moresby parliament building side

Waigani lacked major development until Papua New Guinea achieved self-governance in 1973. Following this, a period of development began for the region. It was during this time that most of the government buildings located in Waigani were built, including the Parliament Building of Papua New Guinea, the Papua New Guinea National Museum and Art Gallery, and the National and Supreme Courts. The Parliament Building was opened in 1984.

In 1993, the Waigani Christian College was established. It began as a preschool, but later grew to include services for children from preschool to adulthood, as well as providing college.

As of the 21st century, Waigani is home to Vision City, Papua New Guinea's largest shopping mall. There is also Rangeview Plaza, the Stanley Hotel, and the Pom City Markets. There is also Sir John Guise Stadium, which hosts local football and rugby games. Furthermore, there is the "Pineapple Building", officially known as the Sir Manasupe Haus, which is a notable local landmark.

== Places of Interest ==
- Lamana Hotel
- Parliament Building of Papua New Guinea
- National and Supreme Court
- University of Papua New Guinea
- Morauta House
- PNG National Museum
- PNG National Library
