= National Library of Papua New Guinea =

Coordinates: 9°25′56″S 147°11′27″E

The National Library of Papua New Guinea is the national library of Papua New Guinea. It was founded in 1978 and is located in Port Moresby.

It opened three years after the country's independence from Australia, the Library was established by Australia as a "gift to the government and people of Papua New Guinea" in order to "assist in establishing a collection of items of national significance".

It houses approximately 56,000 items, "including books, films and video footage as well as maps, charts, photographs and microfilm".
