= Alois Kingsley =

Papua New Guinean politician

Alois Kingsley (born 12 December 1969) is a former Papua New Guinean politician who was Member of Parliament for Madang Open between 2002 and 2007. During this period he served briefly as Minister for Culture and Tourism under Prime Minister Michael Somare until his arrest in 2003. He has spent subsequent years in court on a range of charges related to financial misappropriation.

== Controversies ==
Kingsley was suspended from his portfolio in March 2003, after being arrested for allegedly threatening a university professor with a firearm in Port Moresby in December 2002. The charges were dropped when the main police prosecutor withdrew from the case shortly before the first hearing and the case was dismissed by the judge. The case was reinstated in 2013 and a warrant was issued for his arrest on six charges, two counts each of stealing, forgery and uttering, in 2016 after he failed to appear in court on the matter. The case returned to court in May 2022.
