= Justin Tkatchenko =

Papua New Guinean politician

Justin Tkatchenko CBE, BEM
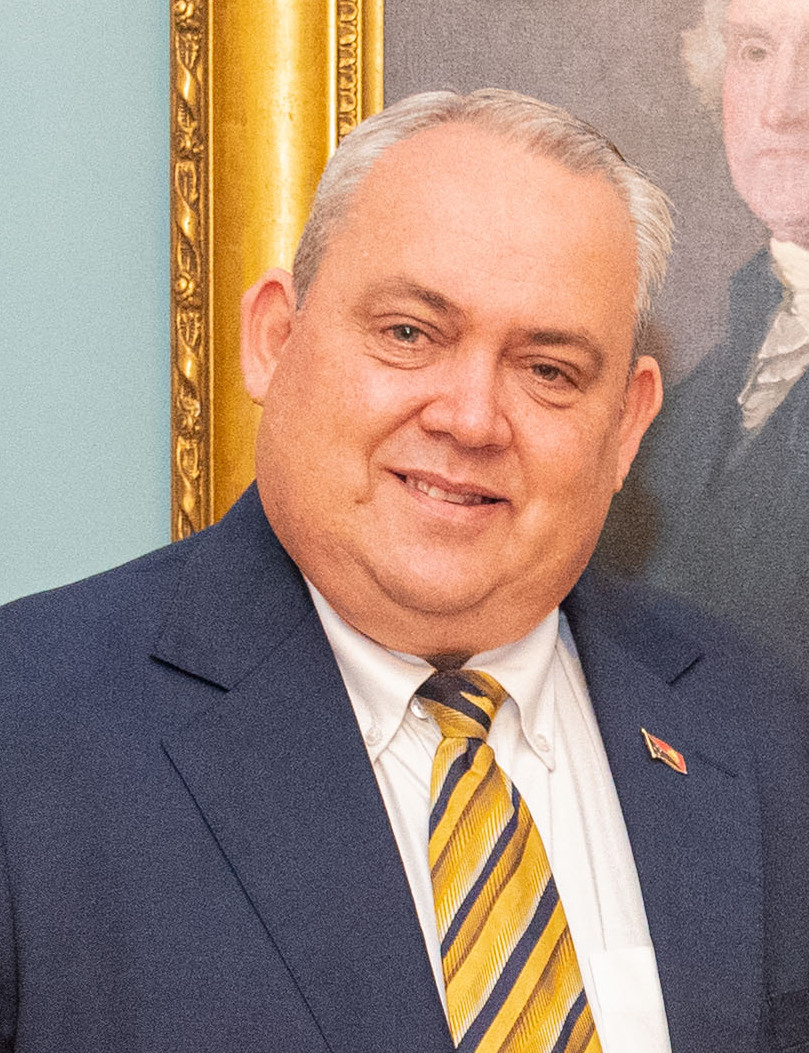
- Tchatchenko in September 2022

Minister of Foreign Affairs
- Incumbent
- Assumed office 18 January 2024
- Prime Minister: James Marape
- Preceded by: James Marape
- In office 23 June 2022 – 12 May 2023
- Prime Minister: James Marape
- Preceded by: Soroi Eoe
- Succeeded by: James Marape

Minister of Housing and Urban Development
- In office 7 June 2019 – 11 June 2022
- Succeeded by: Kobby Bomareo

Member of the National Parliament for Port Moresby South
- Incumbent
- Assumed office 2012
- Preceded by: Dame Carol Kidu

Personal details
- Born: Justin Wayne Tkatchenko; 2 June 1972 (age 54) Melbourne, Victoria, Australia
- Citizenship: Australia; Papua New Guinea
- Party: Pangu Pati
- Spouse: Catherine Jane

Justin Wayne Tkatchenko, CBE BEM (born 2 June 1972) is an Australian and Papua New Guinean politician. He currently served as the Minister of Foreign Affairs in Papua New Guinea since 18 January 2024. Tkatchenko has previously served in the role from 23 June 2022 to 12 May 2023.

== Biography ==
Tkatchenko was born in Australia to Ukrainian immigrants. Tkatchenko was originally from Melbourne, Australia, and followed a brief vocational training in horticulture after his secondary education. He was then employed as curator of the Botanical Gardens of the National Capital District of Papua New Guinea. In 1997, he was appointed high official in the administration of the District. In 1999, he bought a small gardening business, which he grew over the following years. He also became famous as the presenter of a television gardening show, The Happy Gardener.

In 1997, he was awarded the British Empire Medal for services to “the orchid industry and tropical gardening”.

He was naturalised as a Papua New Guinean citizen in 2006 and ran unsuccessfully as a candidate in the Papua New Guinean legislative elections of 2007. He was defeated by outgoing MP Dame Carol Kidu in the constituency of Port Moresby-South.

After Dame Carol's retirement from politics, Tkatchenko won the constituency in the 2012 elections and entered the national parliament as a member of the Social Democratic Party of Powes Parkop. He then became the Minister of Sports in Peter O'Neill's cabinet, and became a member of the latter's People's National Congress party. In April 2016, he also had ministerial responsibility for hosting the 2018 APEC summit in Papua New Guinea. Re-elected MP in the 2017 elections, he retained responsibility for the APEC summit, and he was shifted in cabinet to become Minister of Lands and Territorial Planning.

In the 2018 Queen's Birthday Honours List, Queen Elizabeth II made him Commander of the Order of the British Empire.

The O'Neill government lost the confidence of Parliament in May 2019. Tkatchenko left the National People's Congress to become a member of the Social Democratic Party again, and provided support to the new Prime Minister James Marape, who appointed him Minister of Housing and Urban Development.

Following the 2022 legislative elections, he was appointed as the Minister of Foreign Affairs. A few days later, he publicly mentioned Papua New Guinea's desire to sign a military and security cooperation treaty with Australia, allegedly in response to the similar treaty signed by the Solomon Islands and China in March.

In December 2022, he reiterated Papua New Guinea's recognition of Indonesian sovereignty over western New Guinea, which is disputed by some indigenous Papuans from that region. He requested that Papuans from Indonesia who have taken refuge in Papua New Guinea not proclaim the independence of the unrecognized Republic of West Papua, so as not to disturb the good relations between Port Moresby and Jakarta.

In May 2023, he was part of the Papua New Guinean delegation to the coronation ceremony of Charles III, King of Papua New Guinea, the United Kingdom and the other Commonwealth Realms, along with his eldest daughter Savannah, who attended in place of his wife. Governor-General Sir Bob Dadae led the delegation, while Tkatchenko represented Prime Minister Marape. The Prime Minister remained in Papua New Guinea to prepare for the visit of Indian Prime Minister Narendra Modi and US President Joe Biden. His daughter posted a TikTok video during the trip that caused much controversy because it flaunted cocktails and meals at first-class airport lounges. In an interview with the Australian Broadcasting Corporation on 10 May, he described critics of his daughter's video as "primitive animals" and "useless individuals". This remark caused Opposition Leader Joseph Lelang to call for Tkatchenko to be dismissed from his post as Foreign Minister and have him referred to the Ombudsman Commission for misconduct in office. On Thursday, Tkatchenko apologised for his comments, saying they were "taken completely the wrong way" and were solely directed at those who made "disgusting and vile comments" about his daughter. Prime Minister James Marape said he was offended by the comments but asked the nation to forgive Tkatchenko, saying "Our national character is put to the test ... and we must show the world that we can forgive those who offend us." The next day, he resigned his position as foreign minister, with the role being taken over by Marape.

Tkatchenko was reappointed foreign minister on 18 January 2024 during a cabinet reshuffle to replace Prime Minister James Marape, who had been his own foreign minister.
