= Mount Leonard Murray =

Mount Leonard Murray is a mountain in Papua New Guinea in central New Guinea. It is north-west of Kikori and has an elevation of 2,380 metres (7,810 ft).
