= Kikori =

Town in Gulf Province, Papua New Guinea

- Location within Papua New Guinea
- Coordinates: 7°25′S 144°14′E
- Country: Papua New Guinea
- Province: Gulf Province
- LLG: Kikori District
- Elevation: 12 m (39 ft)
- Time zone: UTC+10 (AEST)
- Mean max temp: 37 °C (99 °F)
- Mean min temp: 22 °C (72 °F)
- Annual rainfall: 5,840 mm (229.9 in)
- Climate: Af
- Location: 179 km (111 mi) north-north-west of Kerema; 217 km (135 mi) north-east of Daru

Kikori is a small town in the Gulf Province of Papua New Guinea.

Kikori lies in the delta of the Kikori River at the head of the Gulf of Papua. This area is particularly biologically rich with a diversity of ecosystems and densely forested, with an intricate system of rivers. The geography is that of limestone karst country, with clay type soils. Oil exploitation in Kikori has been operating for several years. Its first commercial oil deposits were found there by the Kutubu Joint Venture (KJV) which has since constructed a pipeline to the Gulf of Papua and is actively extracting oil from the region.

It is the site of Kikori Airport.

== Climate ==
Kikori has a tropical rainforest climate (Köppen Af) with very heavy rainfall year-round. Temperatures in Kikori are uniformly hot and humidity extremely uncomfortable.

The town has an average annual rainfall of around 5,700 millimetres or 220 inches, making it and surrounding Gulf Province one of the wettest lowland places on Earth – comparable to the Chocó of Colombia, the exposed monsoonal coasts of Myanmar, the Caribbean Coast of Central America, and the Alaska Panhandle. Rainfall averages at least 250 millimetres or 10 inches during every month of the year, but orographic lifting of the southeast trade winds between May and September creates a rainfall peak in those months which average over 550 millimetres or 20 inches – twice as much as the least wet months of November and December and a striking contrast to the rainlessness of those same trade winds in relatively nearby Northern Australia.

Climate data for Kikori
Month	Jan	Feb	Mar	Apr	May	Jun	Jul	Aug	Sep	Oct	Nov	Dec	Year
Mean daily maximum °C (°F)	32.1 (89.8)	31.6 (88.9)	31.2 (88.2)	30.4 (86.7)	29.4 (84.9)	28.6 (83.5)	26.7 (80.1)	28.0 (82.4)	28.4 (83.1)	29.5 (85.1)	31.7 (89.1)	32.2 (90.0)	30.0 (86.0)
Daily mean °C (°F)	26.6 (79.9)	26.4 (79.5)	26.1 (79.0)	25.9 (78.6)	25.3 (77.5)	24.8 (76.6)	23.6 (74.5)	24.4 (75.9)	24.5 (76.1)	25.0 (77.0)	26.6 (79.9)	27.0 (80.6)	25.5 (77.9)
Mean daily minimum °C (°F)	21.2 (70.2)	21.3 (70.3)	21.1 (70.0)	21.4 (70.5)	21.2 (70.2)	21.1 (70.0)	20.5 (68.9)	20.9 (69.6)	20.7 (69.3)	20.5 (68.9)	21.5 (70.7)	21.9 (71.4)	21.1 (70.0)
Average rainfall mm (inches)	342 (13.5)	372 (14.6)	331 (13.0)	405 (15.9)	649 (25.6)	677 (26.7)	658 (25.9)	566 (22.3)	599 (23.6)	464 (18.3)	262 (10.3)	286 (11.3)	5,611 (220.91)
Source: Climate-Data.org

== See also ==
- Mount Leonard Murray
