= Corruption in Papua New Guinea =

Corruption in Papua New Guinea is rife. According to The Economist, "PNG's governments are notorious for corruption, and ever run the risk of turning the state into a fully-fledged kleptocracy".

Transparency International's 2025 Corruption Perceptions Index scored 182 countries according to the perceived corruption of their public sector on a scale from 0 ("highly corrupt") to 100 ("very clean"). Those countries were then ranked by their score; the country ranked first was perceived to have the most honest public sector. In the 2025 Index, Papua New Guinea scored 26 and ranked 142nd. For comparison with regional scores, the best score among the countries of the Asia Pacific region that appeared in the Index (Note: Afghanistan, Australia, Bangladesh, Bhutan, Brunei Darussalam, Cambodia, China, Fiji, Hong Kong, India, Indonesia, Japan, North Korea, South Korea, Laos, Malaysia, Maldives, Mongolia, Myanmar, Nepal, New Zealand, Pakistan, Papua New Guinea, Philippines, Singapore, Solomon Islands, Sri Lanka, Taiwan, Thailand, Timor-Leste, Vanuatu, Vietnam) was 84, the average score was 45 and the worst score was 15. For comparison with worldwide scores, the best score was 89 (ranked 1), the average score was 42, and the worst score was 9 (ranked 181, in a two-way tie).

Papua New Guinea is below the satisfactory levels set by the United Nations Convention against Corruption (UNCAC), according to a report submitted by Transparency International Papua New Guinea (TIPNG) in 2011. TIPNG’s report found that in many cases, anti-corruption bodies in PNG were restricted by shortcomings in financial resources.

== Political and commercial corruption ==
Political corruption in Papua New Guinea is largely enforced by political nepotism and the patronage system of governance. Elected leaders are inclined to seize and distribute resources amongst their electorates in order to secure and maintain popular support. This system of governance is embedded in Melanesian traditions, where the credibility and popularity of a leader amongst his electorate are defined, in part, by the wealth he is able to distribute and the power he is able to wield.

This problem has been compounded, in PNG, by the model of 'politician-turned-businessman' which has dominated the post-1975 political landscape and has muddied the distinctions between business and politics, allowing politicians to divert public monies into their personal accounts. A review of medium-sized businesses in PNG showed that the majority are owned or part-owned by current or former politicians.

PNG has enormous resource potential through its natural endowments in mineral deposits, petroleum, forestry, fishing, and tourism. However, a 2010 report by Human Rights Watch found that in PNG national revenues from the extractive industries had been widely dissipated through official corruption, without leaving any discernible positive impact on the wider population.

The conflict between Melanesian traditions of ‘sharing and caring’, and anti-bribery legislation is often brought into relief during the election cycle. One candidate in the 2002 elections, Allan Bird, published an open letter documenting his experiences: "I was shattered by the attitude of people on my side of the river whose sole drive in life appears to be to live off government or MP freebies for the rest of their lives… I have even had many individuals tell me in no uncertain terms that if I wanted to be an MP, I must pay (bribe) the voter because that ‘is the way we do things around here".

In 2012, Prime Minister Peter O'Neill, when introducing in parliament a twenty-year corruption strategy, cited the following common corrupt acts by government officials and bureaucrats:

- Paying bribes to acquire preferential service or treatment;
- Theft of public money and illegal acquisition of assets by abusing a position of authority;
- Breaching procurement processes;
- Conflict of interest in decision-making;
- Nepotism resulting in the recruitment and retention of unqualified staff.

Because of prevalent corruption, and despite a budget surplus, the national wealth has failed to flow down to the people.

=== Royal Papua New Guinea Constabulary ===
The Royal Papua New Guinea Constabulary (RPNGC) has become "ineffective, corrupt and often abusive" according to a leaked diplomatic cable from the US Embassy in Port Moresby. One report by National Integrity Systems reported gifts and favors being offered to the police in order for cases to be ‘swept under the carpet’. In 2011 the Police Commissioner took the unusual step of asking the public not to offer bribes to police officers. The Commissioner referred to the common practice of paying police officers to avoid fines for minor offenses and urged the public to let themselves be charged instead of contributing to the culture of bribery.

==== Land and logging corruption ====
In August 2011, the government of PNG launched a Commission of Inquiry (COI) to investigate improper leasing through Special Purpose Agricultural and Business Leases (SPABLs). The COI was launched following an early warning letter from the Office of the United Nations High Commissioner for Human Rights (UNHCHR), sent on 11 March 2011. The findings of the COI have been delayed, but are expected to be tabled in August 2012.

According to a report published by Greenpeace in 2012, over 5 million hectares of customary land had been improperly leased between 2003 and 2011 through SPABLs. The land equates to over 11% of the country and over 16% of accessible commercial forests. According to the report, 3.9 million hectares are controlled by foreign-owned companies and of these, Malaysian and Australian firms hold at least 3 million hectares. The evaluation and granting of SPABLs is managed by the Department of Lands and Physical Planning (DLPP), which is described in the Greenpeace report as "grossly incompetent and entirely corrupt".

In August 2011, Transparency International responded to Prime Minister Peter O'Neill's post-election promise to "stamp out corruption wherever it occurs" by recommending that responding to the COI findings must be a priority.

April Salome Forest Management Area is a pilot project for REDD initiative by the United Nations Framework Convention on Climate Change It is also a mishandling and corruption showcase.

== Government anti-corruption efforts ==
=== The National Anti-Corruption Agency ===
The National Anti-Corruption Agency (NACA) was established in April 2004 and was chaired by the Police Commissioner. There were nine public sector agencies which work with the NACA with the objective of combating corruption in the public sector: Royal Papua New Guinea Constabulary, Office of the Public Prosecutor, Ombudsman Commission of Papua New Guinea, Office of the Auditor-General, Office of the Solicitor General, Department of Treasurer, Department of Provincial and Local Government Affairs, Internal Revenue Commission, and the Department of Personnel Management.

Though government agencies have conducted investigations into the misappropriation of public funds, little has been done to effectively address corruption. A number of commentators have stated that the police are too under-resourced to make any inroads into fighting corruption. For example, the police’s Financial Intelligence Unit does not have sufficient staff to halt money laundering and fraud involving public funds. A US Embassy cable reported that a deficit of police resources was reflected in the lack of criminal investigations that are brought to trial.

=== The Ombudsman Commission ===
The Ombudsman Commission of Papua New Guinea is an independent institution mandated to provide a means of redress for citizens suffering from administrative injustice. It has the right to refer cases involving allegations of misconduct by government officials to the Public Prosecutor, who may subsequently refer the matter to the Leadership Tribunal.

In 2005, the Ombudsman Commission stated that of the cases reviewed involving allegations of misconduct by public officials, 80 percent related to misappropriation of funds and 20 percent related to cases of ‘personal benefit’. A review of the 34 cases referred to the Leadership Tribunal between 1976 and 1997 showed that 20 resulted in guilty verdicts. Of these cases, 17 resulted in the dismissal, suspension or resignation of the Leader from office.

=== Anti-corruption strategy of O'Neill administration ===
In 2012 Public Service Minister Bart Philemon estimated that PGK1 billion [US$467 million] of public funds is lost every year due to corruption. Prime Minister Peter O'Neill said that PNG could no longer afford to pay for the cost of corruption.

Upon his appointment as prime minister in August 2011 Peter O'Neill launched a much publicised anti-corruption drive. As part of this, he announced the future formation of an Independent Commission Against Corruption (ICAC) and the formation of an elite anti-corruption investigative team, called Task Force Sweep, which took over the functions and capacity of NACA, and allotted significantly greater financial resources. When Task Force Sweep found there was evidence supporting allegations of corrupt behavior by Mr O'Neill, Mr O'Neill ordered the team shut down.

=== National Anti-Corruption Strategy (NACSTF) ===
Following his reappointment as prime minister in the 2012 general elections, O’Neill announced the formation of another anti-corruption agency, the National Anti-Corruption Strategy Task Force (NACSTF). According to an announcement made in August 2012, the primary role of the NACSTF is to implement the National Anti-Corruption Strategy 2010 -2030, which had been ratified by the UNAC in May 2007. According to O’Neill, the task force will draw membership from key government departments, including the departments of the Prime Minister, Justice, Police, Treasury, the Ombudsman Commission, Auditor General and the Public Prosecutor’s office. The task force has been given a fund of PGK500,000 (US$146,500) for its formation. The NACSTF’s tasks will include:

- Establishing a National Integrity Commission or the Independent Commission Against Corruption (ICAC);
- Developing legislation to protect whistle-blowers;
- Developing a Freedom of Information (FOI) Act; and
- Implement outstanding COI recommendations such as those made into SPABLs.

== See also ==
- Investigation Task Force Sweep
