= James Marape =

Prime Minister of Papua New Guinea since 2019

The Honourable James Marape MP
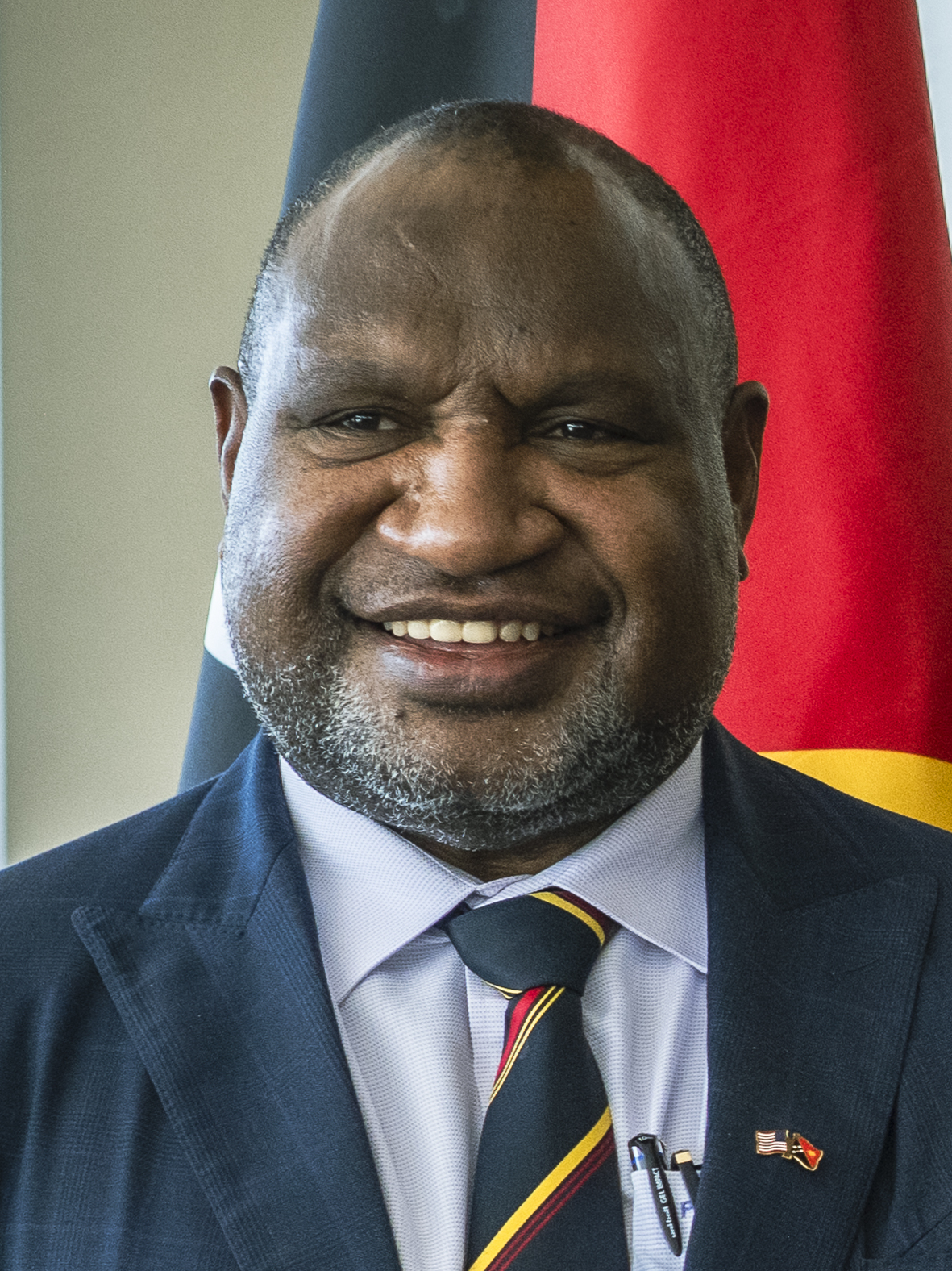
- Marape in 2023

9th Prime Minister of Papua New Guinea
- Incumbent
- Assumed office 30 May 2019
- Monarchs: Elizabeth II; Charles III
- Governor-General: Sir Bob Dadae
- Deputy: Davis Steven (2019–2020); Sam Basil (2020–2022); John Rosso (2022–present)
- Preceded by: Peter O'Neill

Minister of Foreign Affairs
- In office 12 May 2023 – 18 January 2024
- Prime Minister: Himself
- Preceded by: Justin Tkatchenko
- Succeeded by: Justin Tkatchenko

Minister of Finance
- In office August 2012 – 11 April 2019
- Prime Minister: Peter O'Neill
- Preceded by: Peter O'Neill
- Succeeded by: Sam Basil

Minister for Education
- In office 16 December 2008 – 2 August 2011
- Prime Minister: Michael Somare

Member of the National Parliament of Papua New Guinea
- Incumbent
- Assumed office 2007
- Preceded by: Tom Tomiape
- Constituency: Tari-Pori District

Personal details
- Born: 24 April 1971 (age 55) Tari, Southern Highlands Province, Territory of Papua and New Guinea (now Hela Province, Papua New Guinea)
- Party: Pangu Party (2019–present)
- Other political affiliations: People's National Congress (2012–2019); National Alliance Party (2007); People's Progress Party (2002)
- Spouse: Rachael Marape
- Children: 6
- Education: University of Papua New Guinea

James Marape (born 24 April 1971) is a Papua New Guinean politician who has served as the prime minister of Papua New Guinea since May 2019. He has been a member of the National Parliament of Papua New Guinea since July 2007, representing the electorate of Tari-Pori Open in Hela Province in the New Guinea Highlands. He has held Cabinet Posts as Minister of Education (2008–2011), Minister of Finance (2012–2019), and Minister of Foreign Affairs (2023–2024). Marape entered the 2022 elections under the banner of the Pangu Party and won the most seats, while still being far from a majority. He was therefore able to form government, which was elected unopposed by the new parliament.

== Early career ==
Marape was born in 1971 in Tari, Hela Province (then in Southern Highlands Province). He attended Minj Primary School and Kabiufa Adventist Secondary School in the PNG highlands. Marape graduated with a Bachelor of Arts degree from the University of Papua New Guinea in 1993, and a postgraduate Honours Degree in Environmental Science in 2000.

He has a background in managerial functions. From 1994 to 1995, he was Officer in charge at the PNG Institute of Medical Research, Tari Branch. From 1996 to 1998, he was Operations Manager of GDC at the Hides Gas project. After obtaining his honours degree, he became Acting Assistant Secretary of Policy with the Department of Personnel Management from 2001 to 2006.

== Political career ==
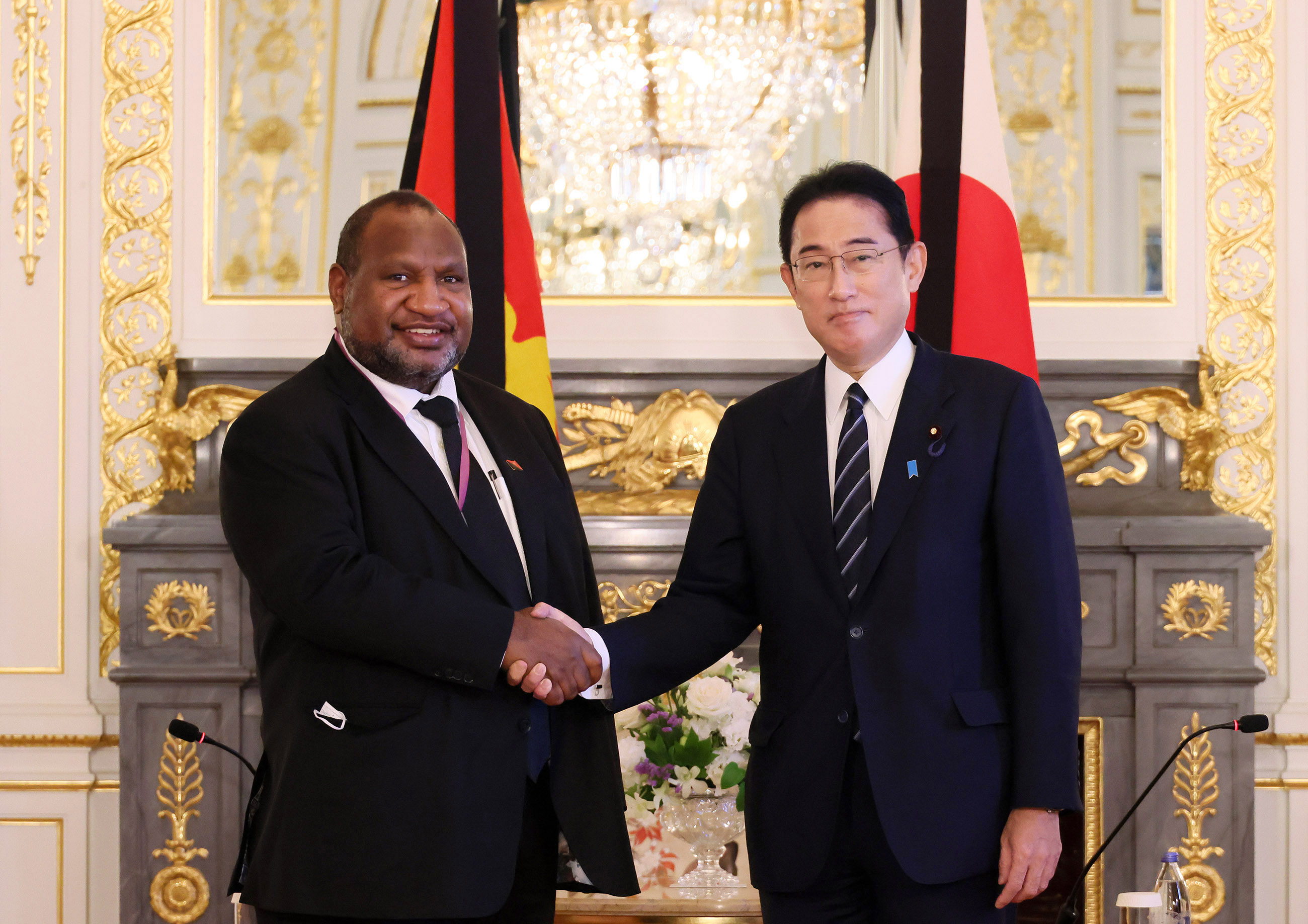
Marape with Fumio Kishida in 2022

His entry into politics was tumultuous. Marape first contested the Tari-Pori seat at the 2002 election for the People's Progress Party, when voting in the Southern Highlands Province was cancelled due to widespread violence. He contested the supplementary election in 2003 but lost to incumbent MP Tom Tomiape in a contest marred by the bashing of a polling official by his supporters. He challenged the result in the Court of Disputed Returns, but both his initial petition and a subsequent appeal were rejected. He contested the seat for a second time at the 2007 election and defeated Tomiape. He won the subsequent parliamentary elections in Tari-Pori (2012 and 2017). He obtained in 2017 50%+1 of the vote (30,192 votes) and this is unusual in PNG's Limited PV system. A challenge by the second runner up Justin Haiara was dismissed by the National Court.

Prime Minister Michael Somare gave him major parliamentary responsibilities after his win in 2007: Parliamentary Secretary for Works, Transport and Civil Aviation, Deputy Chair of the Privileges Committee and member of the Parliamentary Referral Committee on Inter-Government Relations. He was Minister for Education from 16 December 2008 to 2 August 2011. He was then a member of Somare's National Alliance Party. In February 2012, he left the National Alliance Party and joined the party of Prime Minister O'Neill, the People's National Congress (PNC). O'Neill appointed him as Minister of Finance in 2012.

On 11 April 2019, he resigned as Minister of Finance but remained a member of People's National Congress and the Government. He resigned from the party on 29 April 2019. Sam Basil was appointed as Minister for Finance on 18 April 2019.

== Premiership ==
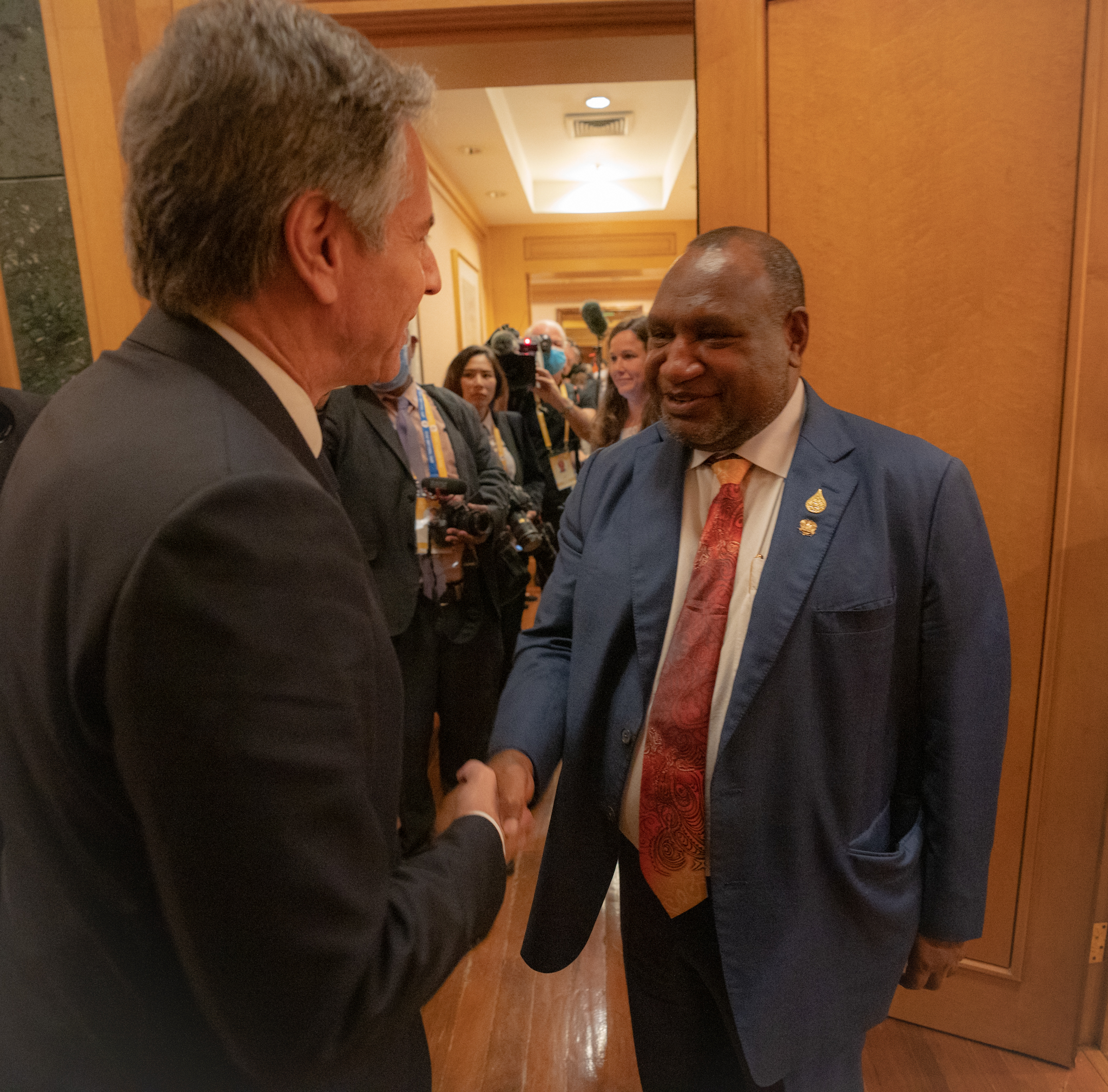
Marape with US Secretary of State Antony Blinken in 2022

On 17 May 2019, the Ombudsman Commission recommended a leadership tribunal to judge O'Neill and Marape on the UBS loan to acquire shares in Oil Search Limited. That was mentioned as the reason for Marape's replacement as alternate PM by Patrick Pruaitch on 28 May 2019. Marape introduced Patrick Pruaitch as alternate PM and declared that the vote for Pruaitch was by consensus. Peter O'Neill had then resigned as Prime Minister on 26 May.

Marape emerged from the succession struggle with 26 MPs who returned to the PNC from opposing parties. As a result, the opposition did not have the numbers anymore for a vote of no confidence. The resignation of O'Neill necessitated the election of a new Prime Minister. Marape obtained in the subsequent election 101 votes as compared to 8 for Mekere Morauta. O'Neill expected that his Cabinet would continue unchanged. However, during a reshuffle on 8 November Marape replaced most of the Cabinet Ministers. O'Neill continues to be critical. He opposes especially Marape's view of the economy. He stresses that Marape is as responsible for the state of affairs as O'Neill: he was minister of finance.

On 10 November 2020 Marape was confronted by an attempt to topple him from power. A motion of no confidence in the Marape government could be mounted after 30 November as the grace period for a new cabinet expired then. A motion by Belden Namah was accepted (57–39) to adjourn Parliament to 1 December with the intention to mount a vote on such a motion. Those who voted with Namah, 55 in number, went in a so-called "camp" in Vanimo, the constituency of Belden. They comprised among others of 11 Cabinet ministers, 3 ex Prime Ministers and 4 ex Deputy Prime Ministers, Marape retorted by starting a "camp" on Loloata island near Port Moresby. Fifty three MPs went with him. At that time there were 110 elective members of parliament and the competition was therefore close.

Peter O'Neill had fronted with Namah the opposition movement and brought a case before the Supreme Court to declare the budget sitting on 17 November unconstitutional. The Supreme Court ruled in his favour and the decisions taken then were invalid. The Speaker recalled parliament on 14 December. The most important issue in this meeting was filing a motion of no confidence with the Private Business committee by Belden Namah. The opposition proposed Patrick Pruaitch as alternate Prime Minister. In that session the opposition had support of 55 members as compared to 32.

The vote of no confidence was never tabled when parliament reconvened on 16 December, Eighteen MPs crossed the floor from the opposition to the government benches and therefore brought the government's support to 70, a solid majority. Sam Basil, the previous deputy prime minister went back to his old place. The competition for alternate prime ministership between Patrick Pruaitch and Sam Basil had been decided in favour of the former to the dismay of Basil and his followers. They returned in protest to the government benches. It was perceived as an attempt to regain power by the old guard. Marape presented a confident New Year's Message in which he also stressed the generational change in PNG politics. He also said that the old guard had a record in which there was little to be proud of.

On 12 January 2022, Marape announced plans to abolish capital punishment. The Capital Punishment Act was repealed on 20 January 2022, and all sentenced prisoners had their death sentences commuted to life imprisonment.

Marape entered the 2022 elections under the banner of Pangu Party and won 38 of the 115 seats declared. O'Neill's PNC was the runner up with 16 seats. Marape was elected unopposed as Prime Minister. He was as leader of the largest party entitled to form the government and left his cabinet virtually unchanged. His new government was elected unopposed by the new parliament.

In 2024, another vote of no confidence was proposed by the opposition, but stalled after the attorney general went to the Supreme Court while it was being debated by a parliamentary committee on 14 February.

In February 2024, Marape became the first leader of a Pacific Islands nation to address the Australian Parliament. On 11 September 2024 he survived a motion of no confidence.

== Personal life ==
James Marape is a member and leader of the Huli people, one of the country's largest tribes and ethnic groups. Marape's father was a Seventh-day Adventist pastor with Marape identifying with the church as well. Marape is married to Rachael Marape, who is originally from East Sepik Province. The couple have six children.

On being sworn in, Marape said he wants Papua New Guinea to be "the richest black Christian nation" in the world.

National Parliament of Papua New Guinea
Preceded by Tom Tomiape	Member of the National Parliament for the Tari-Pori District; 2007–present	Incumbent
Political offices
Preceded by Peter O'Neill	Minister of Finance; 2012–2019	Succeeded by Sam Basil
Preceded by Peter O'Neill	Prime Minister of Papua New Guinea; 2019–present	Incumbent
Preceded by Justin Tkatchenko	Minister of Foreign Affairs; 2023–2024	Succeeded by Justin Tkatchenko
