= Organic Law on the Integrity of Political Parties and Candidates =

Law of Papua New Guinea

National Parliament
- Territorial extent: Papua New Guinea
- Passed by: National Parliament
- Passed: 7 December 2000
- Effective: 22 February 2001
- Administered by: Integrity of Political Parties and Candidates Commission

Amended by
- Revised on 15 October 2003

Struck down by
- Supreme Court Reference No. 11 of 2008

Summary
- Conduct of political parties and members of parliament
- Status: Amended

The Organic Law on the Integrity of Political Parties and Candidates (OLIPPAC) is an organic law of Papua New Guinea which came into effect in 2001. It aimed to foster greater political stability in the historically fractious national parliament. It contained a number of provisions that aimed to formalise the political party system, restrict the ability of Members of Parliament (MPs) to vote against their party line or defect, improve party financing, and increase the number of women candidates. Its impact on these objectives was mixed. A revised version was passed in 2003, and this remained in full force until 2010, when the Supreme Court declared OLIPPAC's restrictions on MP behaviour to be unlawful. While these were seen as the most potentially impactful provisions of OLIPPAC, its other provisions remain in force. There have been various proposals for further revisions in subsequent parliaments.

The government of Papua New Guinea operates under the Westminster system, in which the executive government, including the prime minister, is elected from within the parliament. A stable party system with clear ideological differences between parties has never developed, with politics instead being dominated by personalities, while parties primarily reflect political alliances. The regularity with which parties dissolve, move between government and opposition, and with which MPs shift between parties has led to parliamentary politics being described as "yo-yo politics". Due to the perpetual instability in parliament, from independence until 2002 no government survived a full parliamentary term, being removed mid-term either through motion of no confidence, or due the threats of such motions. This political instability left parliament ineffective and open to corruption.

The implementation of OLIPPAC was intended to enhance the strength of political parties, and thus bring greater stability to the political system, leading to more effective governance. The law created a new registration system for political parties, which saw the political affiliation of MPs become formal for the first time. Related changes discouraged the common practice of running as an independent. OLIPPAC further created the presumption that the largest party would be given the first chance to form a government, while also creating a formal office for the opposition. Inducements for the running of women candidates were introduced, although they proved ineffective. Most significantly, OLIPPAC restricted the ability of MPs to vote against their party line, and to vote against or overthrow a government their party was a part of.

In practice, the impact of OLIPPAC was limited. Provisions restricting MP behaviour were confusing and difficult to enforce, and while many MPs violated the law, none were ejected from parliament. The enforcement of the law was seen as likely to enhance the already significant control of the executive over parliament. The Supreme Court described the provisions on MP behaviour as "draconian" when it struck them down. While in full force, OLIPPAC is thought by some to be partially responsible for the government formed following the 2002 election being the first to survive a full parliamentary term. However, other factors contributed to this, and there was still significant parliamentary turmoil during this time. The provisions of OLIPPAC that remain in force regarding independent candidates have resulted in the formation of a large number of "mosquito" parties consisting of one or two members. However, the proportion of MPs in parliament belonging to the three largest parties has increased. This is likely a result of the provision that the largest party be given the first chance to form a government, which also remains in force.

== Background and passage ==
The government of Papua New Guinea operates through the Westminster system, in which the cabinet and prime minister are drawn from members (MPs) of the unicameral National Parliament. Political parties in Papua New Guinea are unstable and often personality-driven, impeding the establishment of an effective party system. The first parties were formed less than a decade before independence, and became weaker following self-government. The lack of effective parties has weakened the effectiveness of the political system, as governing coalitions end up being created not based on ideological agreement but through personal inducements to individual MPs. The regularity of MPs hopping between parties led to characterisation of parliamentary negotiations as "yo-yo politics". The resulting instability led to the regular fall of governments not only through elections, but also through changing coalitions. It also meant politics was short-termist and focused on obtaining power, with policy questions mattering little and long-term planning almost impossible.

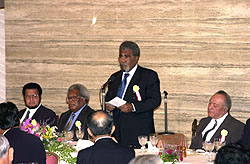
Prime Minister Mekere Morauta established a Constitutional Development Commission which recommended OLIPPAC

Following a period of political instability in the late 1990s amid growing concerns about crime and corruption, Prime Minister Mekere Morauta came to power in 1999 pledging to "restore integrity to our great institutions of state". The most recent election, in 1997, had been particularly chaotic. There was widespread electoral violence, a third of elected MPs were independents, and the eventual prime minister Bill Skate was from a party with only five elected MPs. The Morauta government set up a Constitutional Development Commission which produced a number of recommendations, including changes to the political system. This commission held public consultations on its initiatives.

The "Organic Law on the Integrity of Political Parties and Candidates" was recommended to parliament by the commission. Prominent authors included John Nonggorr and Alphonse Gelu. Parliament passed the law on 7 December 2000 by 84 votes to 0 on its second vote, and it was certified and entered into effect on 22 February 2001. This timing meant the law would apply during the 2002 general election. Morauta stated the law was "the most important Constitutional change this country has made since independence". The law was sometimes discussed in public as the "integrity law".

As an organic law, it directly affected the constitution, and thus had priority over other laws, and could only be altered through a constitutional amendment or another organic law. Specifically, it is intended to implement Sub-Divisions V1.2.H and V1.2.H of the constitution, (Note: Other sources describe this as Section 129, The Integrity of Political Parties, and Section 130, Integrity of Candidates.) relating to the conduct of political parties, candidates, and elections, for which no previous organic laws had been passed. Specifically, the constitution called for a law that would "restrict a member of the Parliament in certain circumstances from resigning or withdrawing from or failing to support a political party of which he is a member" and "to restrict in certain circumstances the voting rights of a member of the Parliament". The first proposal to do so was in 1989, with later attempts in 1993 and 1998. The 2000 effort succeeded due to bipartisan support, becoming Constitutional Amendment No. 22. Ultimately, its changes were intended to improve governance and reduce corruption.

In March 2003, the government under Prime Minister Michael Somare stated OLIPPAC was "riddled with flaws and defects", and would be revised. While the entirety of OLIPPAC was rearranged, consequential changes were limited. The main impacts were providing additional funding to parties and to a newly established Office of the Opposition, restrictions on the cooperation between parties and independents, and limits to motions of no confidence. The proposed amendments were mostly uncontroversial, although those relating to the motions of no confidence did not pass. The first reading of the revised OLIPPAC passed on 17 July with only six voting against, while the second reading passed on 19 September with only seven voting against. The amended version thus came into force on 15 October 2003. These amendments included a preamble, which stated the law sought to "develop and nurture a political culture in which intrinsic values of constitutional democracy are respected and maintained" and "to ensure participation of people to enhance the principle of government of the people, for the people, but more importantly, by the people". Unsuccessful attempts to push through the amendments regarding motions of no confidence continued until 2004, with votes for failing to reach the required two-third threshold.

== Provisions ==
...the Electoral Commission shall advise the Head of State of the registered political party which has endorsed the greatest number of candidates declared elected in the election, and the Head of State, acting with, and in accordance with, the advice of the Electoral Commission, shall invite that registered political party to form the government in accordance with this section

— OLIPPAC s. 63(1)

OLIPPAC was written with a wide range of provisions, and could be viewed as effectively a number of different laws with different objectives. The text is divided into 8 sections: Preliminary (definitions), Political Parties Generally, Registration of Political Parties, Central Fund Board of Management, Funding Political Parties, Financial Returns, Strengthening of Political Parties, and Miscellaneous.

OLIPPAC's focus was on strengthening political parties by giving them more control over MPs elected on their platform, which would be complemented by improved MP discipline. To this end, it contained a number of provisions aimed at strengthening the operation of political parties. An independent "Registry of Political Parties" had its own office created under the law. This was separate to and in part this duplicated the existing registration system previously operated by the Papua New Guinea Electoral Commission. The registrar would have a term of at least six years, meaning any appointed registrar would continue beyond a maximum five-year single parliamentary term. A party must be registered to field candidates in an election. To qualify for registration, a party must not be restricted to one geographic area or ethnic group, must not promote regionalism or secession, and must have an internal democratic processes. To register parties must submit their constitution and a members list, and then must submit financial returns. A party must also have a number of staff positions and at least 500 financial members, and must not include words like "independent" in their name. Individuals cannot be a member of multiple parties. Those elected as independents were unable to vote for prime minister immediately after the election. However, they would later be able to join a political party, at which point they would have similar obligations to those elected under the party's banner. A party must also be registered under the Associations Incorporation Act. The largest party following an election would be the first party invited to nominate a prime minister and form a government, theoretically reducing the intensity of coalition-building negotiations. It was however legal for parties to merge after an election. Elected independents who did not join a party before the election of a Speaker would not be allowed to join a party until the next election. Independents who supported the election of a prime minister were required to vote with them on constitutional and budget matters, and could not oppose them in a motion of no confidence.

A system of public party subsidies was introduced, with allocation of funding determined by the number of party-affiliated MPs in the parliament. The Integrity of Political Parties and Candidates Commission (IPPCC) was established by OLIPPAC, and it is this commission which oversees and appoints the Registry of Political Parties. The commission includes representatives of the electoral commission, parliament, the National Economic and Fiscal Commission, churches, and women's groups. The commission also oversees a Central Fund. It is through this fund that the Office of the Opposition is financially supported, and funds are also provided to party Presidents and Secretaries. In total, parties receive Kn10,000 per MP. The fund itself is maintained via the national budget, in addition to donations. This provides a structural advantage to larger parties, on top of the existing advantages that came with the discretionary constituency funds allocated to each MP. The IPPCC created a website through which its decisions could be publicly accessible. OLIPPAC also legalised the foreign funding of political parties and candidates, of up to Kn0.5 million per candidate or party. This is the same limit for individual contributions from citizens. Additional financial subsidies were introduced for parties running women candidates. Any women candidate that received 10% of the vote would have some of their campaign expenses refunded. Campaign expenses incurred during election periods must be recorded as a condition of the funding, to be included in the required annual financial returns.

Sanctions were introduced for party hopping. MPs were tied to the party which they represented during the election for the entirety of the parliament, unless the party as a whole falls into disrepute. MPs could not vote against the political party they ran on constitutional issues, on budgets, on the election of prime ministers, and on a motion of no confidence, being able only to vote for or abstain. MPs who violate this law are considered to have resigned from the party, are ineligible to be selected for a ministerial or committee leadership positions, may become liable to repay the party for campaign expenses, and may be expelled from parliament. (However, the party as a whole can collectively change its position via resolution.) The exception was at the end of a parliament, when MPs could leave a party before the next election. Sanctions were also introduced for interfering with MPs, including threatening and detaining them. This was a response to the practice of holding newly elected MPs in specific areas (a process sometimes known as "lockup" or "camping") during the coalition building period. In addition, parties were barred from supporting more than one individual in a single constituency. Party leaders whose parties did not meet the laws might be held responsible for violations of the Leadership Code, with similar sanctions of being ineligible for some leadership positions.

== Impact ==
The 2002 election continued the trend of having a significant number of independent MPs elected (17), although this was less than in previous elections. Political parties did not strongly impact the election campaign. A total of 43 parties contested the election, suggesting a lot of small parties. The provision that the largest party (National Alliance with 19 seats) is called to form the government was followed, although not without attempts by others to form a coalition. Even for National Alliance, there was substantial horse-trading and coercion needed to form the eventual coalition, with the initial 19 seats of the National Alliance of the 120 member house turning into a vote of 88 votes in favour of the eventual coalition (and no votes against). The small fall in the number of independent MPs and rise in the number of parties suggested the law was leading to the formation of one or two people parties (referred to as "mosquito" or "one-man" parties) for those who would otherwise have campaigned as independents. While there were only 12 registered parties in the 1997 election, there were 43 in 2002. Immediately following the 1997 election 14 parties had representation in parliament, while after the 2002 election 24 did. The number of female candidates in the 2002 election was 74, higher than 45 at the previous election, but only one received 10% of the vote. This was the only women candidate elected, meaning the parliament following 2002 had one fewer women than the previous parliament. It also had the highest number of new members, with 70% being first-time MPs. Party ideology remained unfixed, and the practice of independent MPs joining parties continued, with some former independents even becoming party leaders. By June 2024, party mergers reduced the initial 24 parties in parliament to 15. The first registrar appointed by the government was Paul Bengo, who had previously served as Somare's principal private secretary.

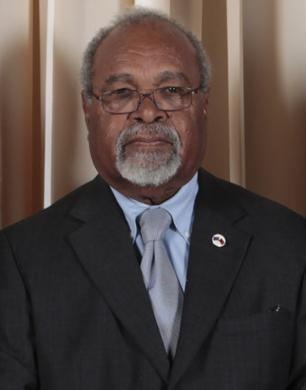
Prime Minister Michael Somare passed an amended OLIPPAC in 2003, and became the first prime minister of independent Papua New Guinea to retain power for a full term.

Discussions about the proposed amendment to OLIPPAC regarding motions of no confidence were the focus of political activity in 2003. In July and August 2003, opposition MPs met at Alotau to discuss the issue, missing an entire parliamentary session for the first time in history and in violation of OLIPPAC. Somare made a renewed attempt to extend the grace period from 18 months to 36. He proposed a constitutional amendment (requiring a two-thirds majority), having failed to have the provision included in the revised 2003 OLIPPAC. The resulting debates saw a number of MPs vote against their parties' positions. Some of these MPs asserted that there was no violation of OLIPPAC due to there being no formal party resolution on the vote. This event created questions about how OLIPPAC could or would be enforced. While rebelling MPs were referred to an ombudsman, in the end no action was taken against them and the bill was withdrawn. In May 2004, the deputy prime minister Moses Maladina was removed from government, but other members of his party retained their positions. Meanwhile, Morauta's opposition party joined the government.

Amid political machinations regarding a potential no confidence vote in mid-2004, government MP Patrick Pruaitch stated "opposition MPs are carrying on as if the Organic Law on [the Integrity of] Political Parties and Candidates does not exist". Another pro-government MP Paul Tiensten stated that the registrar was not intervening to prevent MP coercion. The registrar stated "the majority of the members of Parliament do not understand the provisions of the Organic Law". However, the relative inaction of the registrar early on may have given the impression that MP actions did not contravene the law, and in effect allowed the speaker to interpret the law on his own terms. The splitting of several parties between pro- and anti-government factions and the switching of MPs between parties led to legal challenges. In one case, the registrar ruled that pro-government MP Rabbie Namaliu was the leader of the Pangu Pati, but a subsequent court ruling found that pro-opposition Chris Haiveta was the leader. OLIPPAC also had no impact on the government using parliamentary tricks to stay in powers, including deliberately engineering the split of potential opposition parties. (Note: During political manoeuvres around a possible motion of no confidence, the wife of Bill Skate stated she would divorce him if his party defected from the government.) Skate, the speaker at the time, crossed the floor in May 2024 after Somare removed him from the cabinet. Somare replaced him as speaker with Jeffery Nape, a member of Somare's party. The politician Allan Marat, sacked as deputy prime minister by Somare, provided a unique case of strict adherence to OLIPPAC, as he joined the government backbenches rather than the opposition. The registrar made his first rulings only in November.

In December 2005, the registrar declared that 21 parties were not in compliance with OLIPPAC. In August 2006, it announced 14 parties would be deregistered. However, some MPs declared the formation of new parties. The political infighting that occurred throughout the parliament resulted in many absences from parliamentary sittings, and OLIPPAC's ultimate success in maintaining party stability was limited, either by a lack of understanding or by a lack of enforcement. The legal disputes that arose over specifics of the law's application added additional confusion to its operation.

An increase in government revenue from natural resource extraction that began in 2005 led to more funds being distributed to MPs. This reduced political turmoil in parliament, while reducing the percentage of funds distributed to MPs as a result of OLIPPAC to just 0.2% of the total. Somare remained prime minister until the 2007 election, following which he was once again the leader of the largest party and was again elected prime minister. Somare was able to use the natural resource wealth to bolster his party's size. This election saw 34 registered parties compete, with 21 entering parliament, 10 of which had only one or two MPs. Somare's National Alliance Party had 27 seats, while Morauta's Papua New Guinea Party had only 8 seats. Political disputes reemerged during this term, with tactics to avoid a motion of no confidence vote including distributing K2 million in funds to each MP in August 2009.

OLIPPAC attempted to use institutional mechanisms to change the way parliamentary politics was conducted, however its effectiveness was ultimately limited by the already existing social expectations and MP culture it wanted to change. Political parties gained elements of being public bodies with state funding. It is due to this that the party membership of an MP became fixed, replacing a formerly informal and opaque system. It also formalised the process of party merges, which now required official resolutions from both parties. Furthermore, horse trading was mostly between parties rather than between individuals.

...there is a need to address the serious problems facing PNG stemming from the weak political system, leading to the constant changes of governments and constant threats to any government governing the country meaningfully. The phenomenon itself—of constant changes of government and threats to governance—is well known. Also well known are the consequences of this phenomenon. The time and energy we as political leaders spend on it are incalculable. The consequences to the country as a whole: in the economy, social disorder and other negative consequences that follow from instability affect the well being of our people

— National Executive Council, March 2000

OLIPPAC is also likely partially responsible for Somare being able to become the first prime minister of independent Papua New Guinea to serve for a whole term, following his election in 2002. After parts of OLIPPAC were found unconstitutional in 2010, Somare lost power in 2011. OLIPPAC was not solely responsible for this outcome, with its provisions being ignored by some MPs during Somare's tenure. Somare's government also used pre-OLIPPAC tactics to control parliament, rather than solely trying to enforce OLIPPAC. There were also other sources of political instability, which also affected the opposition party led by Morauta. Parties continued to split, and new parties continued to be founded. Morauta's party was itself formed following the election, rather than the expected formation of a party to contest the election. The parliamentary term saw five different deputy prime ministers serving under Somare. Furthermore, individual party constitutions often lacked clear mechanisms to agree on common positions, meaning that in divided parties it was sometimes unclear what the party line was, to the extent that some parties submitted multiple official resolutions to the speaker. MPs required to vote for a motion could in practice avoid this simply by being absent from parliament. Enforcement by the house speaker was at times considered selective. The specifics of some enforcement mechanisms unclear, while bodies such as the commission were underfunded, rendering them ineffectual. The influence of the government over both the speaker and the registrar meant that their independence was limited, and any enforcement was easily manipulated to be biased against the political opposition. In January 2004 the ombudsman accused the registrar of not referring five cabinet ministers to the ombudsman.

The bar on parties supporting multiple candidates was not fully effective, as parties continued to support independents (who are referred to as "undercover" candidates). This was particularly meaningful in the 2007 election, as it was the first general election to use limited preferential voting. The registrar was not able to deregister parties in practice.

In terms of party processes, OLIPPAC was an attempt through law to make parties function in the way that they had organically developed to function in other countries. Academic Jon Fraenkel stated in 2024 that it is likely that no other democracy "has trialled a framework of party laws that is quite as far-reaching in intent as that in PNG". Ultimately, attempts to shift parliamentary behaviour may have little impact so long as electoral campaigning continues to be local and focus on individuals. OLIPPAC's focus on integrity was aimed at party strength and stability, but did little to address ethical aspects of integrity, not addressing the perception of politics as a business, or a focus on localism. The Standing Orders of Parliament were never changed to align with OLIPPAC. The lack of action by the Ombudsman may have been in part due to concerns by the Ombudsman that OLIPPAC was being used be the executive to exert undue control over the legislature (as the court later decided). Any effective enforcement would have required independent bodies willing and able to confront the executive. In the end no MP lost their seats following a violation of OLIPPAC.

There was no standard amount of support provided by parties to their candidates, with support sometimes being as little as covering the nomination fee. While OLIPPAC made party allegiance important in parliament, this did not translate to importance during electoral campaigns. Local alliances between candidates for preferences in the new preferential voting system were made outside of party structures. There was little to compel candidates running for provincial seats from cooperating with those from the same party running for district seats within their provinces, as it would risk alienating district candidates from other parties who might in turn campaign against them.

Following the 2002 election, 15 of the 17 elected independents quickly joined political parties. Independent MPs remained an important part of coalition building following the 2007 election, despite OLIPPAC being in full force. Furthermore, the number of small parties competing in the elections proliferated, many with few candidates and even those successful ending up with only one or two MPs. This weakened any potential for parties to be more closely linked to ideological platforms. Some were formed around individual MPs who had left their party prior to 2007.

== Partial invalidation ==
Opposition MPs often criticised OLIPPAC for enhancing executive dominance. Julius Chan stated after the 2007 election that OLIPPAC promoted dictatorship. In 2008, opposition MP Bob Danaya began a court case challenging OLIPPAC. Bob Danaya was the leader of the Western Province government (known as the Fly River provincial government). The Supreme Court was conscious of the "potential risk of politicisation of the court in deciding politically charged cases", but noted that judges should be "politically conscious" and "take full account of the society in which they live".

The resulting ruling, handed down in July 2010, struck down the most significant provisions of OLIPPAC on the grounds that the restrictions imposed on MP voting rights was unconstitutional. Under the ruling, MPs could no longer be barred from leaving political parties, or be forced to vote in a certain manner. The ban on direct foreign funding of political parties was also reintroduced. In total, 10 of OLIPPAC's provisions were removed. In their ruling, Chief Minister Salamo Injia and the other judges stated that the restrictions on MPs were "unheard of in any democratic country", and "not reasonably justifiable for the purpose for which they [had] been enacted", calling them "draconian". The court went further than invalidating provisions of OLIPPAC, and clarified the provisions of the constitution which OLIPPAC was intended to address, limiting the scope of any future legislation regarding the actions of MPs. The court however ruling however explicitly noted that amendments to the constitution were not constrained by a basic structure doctrine, meaning the constitution could be amended, thus preserving the portions of OLIPPAC it did not explicitly strike down.

The court decision was welcomed by those who believed that OLIPPAC had given too much power to the executive and thus weakened parliamentary scrutiny. However, the decision also removed any barrier to a return to "yo-yo" politics. Shortly after the ruling, several MPs defected from the governing coalition. The possibility of no confidence motions arose again. After Somare left the country to have heart surgery, parliament elected Peter O'Neill as prime minister, leading to a constitutional crisis that was resolved only due to occurrence of the 2012 election.

== Continuing provisions and legacy ==
The parts of OLIPPAC relating to the Office of the Registrar, the IPPCC, party funding, and the role of the largest party in attempting to form a government remain in force. This last one remains the most significant continuing impact. The goal of increasing women's representation has been unsuccessful. In 2011, the IPPCC reported that it had received no claims for reimbursement regarding campaign expenditures for female candidates.

In August 2012 the recently elected O'Neill government announced it would seek to reform OLIPPAC. However, the government instituted a number of changes that would entrench its power, including extending the grace period and making motion of no confidence more difficult to implement, reducing internal pressure to have an effective OLIPPAC. The three constitutional amendments that enabled these changes were declared unlawful by the Supreme Court on 4 September 2015, with the court noting that the relevant amendments were "in essence no different to the Constitutional amendments struck down in the OLIPAC [sic] case". In May 2015, the government approved a new version of OLIPPAC, but it was not tabled in parliament before the 2017 election.

The proposed OLIPPAC revisions became an active subject of discussion in the 2017 parliament, including by Alphonse Gelu, who was at that point serving as the Registrar of Political Parties. The revised legislation was tabled in parliament in 2020, but did not proceed to debate. The proposed amendments sought to give the registrar further control over small parties and independents, with it taking on the current role of the Ombudsman Commission. Another proposal was to change motions of no confidence so that a new prime minister was selected from the governing coalition. The failure of these amendments is likely in part due to concerns that they would be found unlawful, in a similar manner to the 2010 court decision.

While OLIPPAC is regarded as well-intentioned, its impacts are seen as mixed to negative. Criticisms have variously accused it of being unambitious, or of trying to tackle procedurally an issue of political culture. Even taking into account the supreme court action, its impact may have strengthened executive dominance over parliament. There is debate over how much it contributed to the survival of the 2002-2007 Somare government compared to other factors. The 2012-2017 O'Neill government became the second to survive a full term, despite parts of OLIPPAC no longer being in effect. The political culture of shifting coalitions continued post-2010, much as it had still continued even while all of OLIPPAC was in force, with a focus on parliamentary politics over policy. The number of elected independents has remained lower than before OLIPPAC. The number of parties in parliament has remained higher, however the proportion of seats held by the largest three parties has increased, a reversal of the trend of shrinking parties that was in place up until the 1997 election. This is likely due at least in part to the still extant provision of OLIPPAC empowering the largest party as the first choice to form a government, and means that while the number of parties has increased, there has been a reduction in political fragmentation (although parties remain internally fractious). The 2017 election saw high levels of fraud, with O'Neill using the powers of incumbency to ensure his party was the largest after the election, and thus was given the first chance to form a government under the remaining provisions of OLIPPAC. After O'Neill resigned and was replaced by James Marape in May 2019, Marape was also able to come out of the 2022 election with his Pangu Party having the most seats. The power of the executive remains constrained to some extent by the lack of any party being able to achieve a majority, as well as by the rulings of the court system.

The government of the neighbouring Solomon Islands passed similar legislation in 2014, taking into account the Papua New Guinean supreme court decision in crafting the law. The success of this effort, which sought to address similar political challenges, was also limited.
