= Ken Fairweather =

Papua New Guinean politician (1945–2022)

The Right Honourable Ken Fairweather MP

Member of Parliament for Sumkar Open
- In office 6 August 2007 – 2 August 2017
- Preceded by: Mathew Gubag
- Succeeded by: Chris Nangoi

Personal details
- Born: 27 September 1945 Territory of New Guinea
- Died: 24 October 2022 (aged 77) Port Moresby, Papua New Guinea
- Party: Independent, then People's National Congress Party

Ken Fairweather (27 September 1945 – 24 October 2022) was a Papua New Guinean politician. He was a member of the National Parliament of Papua New Guinea from 2007 to 2017, representing the electorate of Sumkar Open. He was Minister for Housing and Urban Development in Peter O'Neill's first ministry in 2011, but was subsequently dropped from Cabinet.

== Political career ==
Fairweather was first elected to the National Parliament in the 2007 general election, as independent MP for the Sumkar Open constituency in Madang Province, though he subsequently joined the People's National Congress Party. His election was notable as he defeated Jerry Singirok to take the seat. (Singirok was the Commander of the Papua New Guinea Defence Force during the Sandline affair of 1997, when there were fears the army might overthrow Prime Minister Julius Chan's government.)

Initially a government backbencher, he withdrew his support from Sir Michael Somare's coalition government in June 2010, in protest over amendments to the Environment Act, which he said had been undemocratically "bulldozed through Parliament". Under the amendments, if the authorities granted a company permission to exploit resources on particular lands, landowners would have no recourse to challenge the permit in court. Fairweather said the amendments deprived the people of their rights, and would lead to harmful environmental damage; Environment and Conservation Minister Benny Allen responded that they were in the "national interest". Fairweather announced he would be sitting on Parliament's "middle benches", rather than specifically joining the Opposition.

In January 2011, he stood as candidate for the position of Governor of Madang Province, to succeed Sir Arnold Amet, who had just been appointed Attorney General and Minister for Justice. He was defeated by James Gau, deputy Minister for Works, who received eighteen votes to Fairweather's eight in the provincial assembly.

In April 2011, Amet organised a meeting in Madang so that landowners potentially affected by a proposed Pacific Marine Industrial Zone could express their views and concerns to members of the government. As local MP, Fairweather attended, and criticised the project, describing it as a "con-job" which would not benefit his constituents. He also described Gabriel Kapris (the Minister for Commerce and Industry, who was present) as a stil-man, a Tok Pisin word for a thief. Amet responded by calling Fairweather, who is white, "a white millionaire that the people do not need", telling him: "You pack up and you leave my island. [...] You don't belong here". He added that a white person could never understand the country, and thus could not provide the services that the people needed. (This was disputed by villagers, who pointed out that, under Fairweather, they had benefited from new school facilities, roads, and a greater access to water supplies.) The exchange, which had been filmed, was posted on YouTube, and made front-page news in the Post-Courier, the country's largest-selling daily newspaper. The paper described Amet's words as "shamefully wrong and unbecoming of a state minister, especially coming from the former Chief Justice of Papua New Guinea". In response, Amet "took out a full page advertisement" in the paper, in which he apologised to Fairweather and the people of Sumkar "for [his] unbecoming racial and abusive comments and behaviour".

At the start of August 2011, Fairweather supported a successful parliamentary motion of no confidence which brought down the government of Acting Prime Minister Sam Abal (standing in for Somare while the latter was hospitalised for a serious heart condition), enabling Peter O'Neill to become prime minister. O'Neill appointed Fairweather as his Minister for Housing and Urban Development.

Fairweather was defeated by Chris Nangoi at the 2017 election.

Fairweather died in a Port Moresby hospital on 24 October 2022 of an unspecified illness at the age of 77.

National Parliament of Papua New Guinea
Preceded by Matthew Gubag	Member for Sumkar Open; 2007–2017	Succeeded by Chris Nangoi
