= Mari Kapi =

Chief Justice Sir Mari Kapi GCL KCMG CBE (12 December 1950 – 25 March 2009) was a Papua New Guinean judge who served as the fourth Chief Justice of the Supreme Court of Papua New Guinea from 16 August 2003 until his retirement in 2008 for health reasons. Kapi was the first Papua New Guinean citizen to be appointed as a judge and only the third PNG national to be appointed Chief Justice.

Kapi was born at Keapara village, Rigo District, Central Province. He was entirely educated in Papua New Guinea, graduating from the University of Papua New Guinea in 1972. He was employed as a lawyer with the Office of the Public Solicitor and on 1 January 1978 became the first Papua New Guinean national to be appointed a puisne justice of the Supreme and National Courts of Papua New Guinea (the Supreme Court not being a separately constituted court but a "full court" of the National Court). He was appointed Deputy Chief Justice in 1982.

In his jurisprudence, Sir Mari is generally perceived as a strict legalist in the stamp of Sir Owen Dixon and his judgments are noted for their erudition, articulateness and highly literate awareness of common law principles. In evident recognition of Mr Justice Kapi's considerable rigour in the application of the principle of stare decisis he was appointed a member of the Fiji Court of Appeal and, in addition to his judicial responsibilities in Papua New Guinea, he also rendered appellate judgments in that common law jurisdiction.

Sir Mari was elevated to Chief Justice of the Supreme Court of Papua New Guinea on 16 August 2003, for a ten-year term, the fourth person to occupy that position since Papua New Guinea's independence in 1975.

Already a Knight Bachelor, he was appointed Knight Commander of the Order of St Michael and St George (KCMG) in the 2008 Birthday Honours.

Mari retired from active duty on the Supreme Court in August 2008, citing deteriorating health. He last official "farewell ceremonial sitting" took place in Port Moresby on 21 November 2009. His successor as Chief Justice, Sir Salamo Injia, PNG Attorney General Allan Marat and PNG Law Society president Kerenga Kua jointly described Kapi as a "perfect role model in the legal profession" and a "top national jurist."

Mari credited the support from colleagues and friends in Papua New Guinea, Australia, the Solomon Islands, New Zealand and Fiji, as well as the National Judicial Staff Services, for his successful career at the November 2008 retirement ceremony.

Mari was the founding chairman of Prison Fellowship Papua New Guinea and member of the Board of Prison Fellowship International. He has received the President's award for Ministry Statesmanship, recognizing his impact and influence in advancing the cause of doing justice with mercy.

Sir Mari Kapi died from kidney failure on 25 March 2009, in Singapore at the age of 58. He had been in Singapore's Raffles Hospital since February 2009 awaiting a kidney transplant from his younger brother. However, the transplant operation had been delayed.

Kapi's body was returned to Papua New Guinea for burial.

== See also ==
- Law of Papua New Guinea

Legal offices
Preceded by Sir Arnold Amet	Chief Justice of the Supreme Court of Papua New Guinea; 2003–2008	Succeeded by Sir Salamo Injia
