= Ministry of Justice (Papua New Guinea) =

Government ministry of Papua New Guinea

The Ministry of Justice of Papua New Guinea and Department of Justice & Attorney General acts as the principal advisor to the government on all legal matters and is responsible for all civil litigation matters by and against the state. The Minister of Justice (who serves simultaneously as the Attorney General if s/he is a qualified lawyer) gives opinions on any questions relating to the interpretation or application of the laws of Papua New Guinea including the Constitution, Organic Laws, Acts of Parliament and all other subordinate legislation. The ministry oversees the following institutions:

- The Department of Justice and Attorney General
- The Judicial and Legal Services Commission
- The Magisterial Services
- The National Judicial Staff Services
- The Land Titles Commission
- The National Lands Commission
- Constitutional and Law Reform Commission
- National and Supreme Courts
- Public Prosecutor’s Office
- Public Solicitor’s Office
- Legal Training Institute
- The Parole Board
- The Advisory Committee on the Power of Mercy

== List of ministers (Post-1975 upon achieving independence) ==
- Ebia Olewale (1975-1977)
- Belba Biri (1977-1978)
- Nahau Rooney (1978-1979) [1st female]
- Paul Torato (1980-1981)
- John Yaka (1981-1982)
- Tony Bais (1982-1985)
- Tom Pais (1985)
- Warren Dutton (1986-1987)
- Albert Kipalan (1987-1988)
- Bernard Narakobi (1989-1992)
- Philemon Embel (1992-1994)
- Robert Timo Nagele (1994-1996)
- Arnold Marsipal (1996-1997
- Jacob Wama (1997-1999)
- Kilroy Genia (2000-2001)
- Puri Ruing (2001-2002)
- Mark Maipakai (2002-2007)
- Allan Marat (2007-2010)
- Ano Pala (2010)
- Arnold Amet (2011)
- Allan Marat (2011-2012)
- Kerenga Kua (2012-2017)
- Davis Steven (2017-2020)
- Bryan Kramer (2020-2022)
- Pila Niningi (2022–present)

== See also ==
- Justice ministry
- Politics of Papua New Guinea
