= Law of Papua New Guinea =

The law of Papua New Guinea (PNG) consists of the Constitution, ordinary statutes enacted by Parliament or adopted at independence from overseas (together with their pendant regulations) and judge-made law.

== Constitution ==
The Parliament building of Papua New Guinea in Port Moresby

The Constitution is autochthonous (a constitutional term indicating that legal continuity with the former metropolitan power was severed and that the Constitution derived its authority directly from the people of Papua New Guinea). It was passed by the self declared National Constituent Assembly, made up of members from the pre-independence House of Assembly. This is similar to the self declared Constitution of the United States and unlike the constitutions of Australia and Canada, which were enacted by the Parliament of the UK.

The Constitution is entrenched, meaning that its provisions overbear any ordinary statutory enactments which the courts find to be inconsistent with it. The Constitution contains a select number of human rights:

- the right to life, liberty and security of person and protection of the law
- the right to take part in political activities
- freedom from inhuman treatment and forced labour
- freedom of conscience, expression, information, assembly and association
- freedom of employment and movement
- the right to privacy and property

The Constitution was largely shaped by the work of the Constitutional Planning Committee (CPC), led by John Momis. From 1973 to 1975, the CPC undertook an extensive consultative process across Papua New Guinea with 381 meetings taking place with approximately 60,000 people attending all together. The recommendations of the CPC in its final report were largely implemented in the final Constitution enacted by the National Constituent Assembly following independence on 16 September 1975. These included the inclusion of "National Goals and Directive Principles", setting out the principles the new nation was to aspire to. Some recommendations of the CPC were not implemented, such as the suggestion that PNG become a republic without a formal head of state. Instead, the Constitution as passed by the National Constituent Assembly (made up of members of the pre-independence House of Assembly) elevated Queen Elizabeth II and her successors to be the head of state and Queen of Papua New Guinea, who would be represented by, and have their powers be exercised by, a governor-general selected by the Parliament. Criminal proceedings are brought in the name of "The State" rather than "The King" or "R."

When enacted, the Constitution was the world's third longest behind Yugoslavia and India; it is now the fifth longest.

== Underlying law ==
The Constitution declares the "underlying law" — that is, the separate common law of Papua New Guinea — to consist of the Constitution, "customary law" derived from the "custom" of the various peoples of Papua New Guinea, and the common law of England as it stood at the date of Papua New Guinea's independence on 16 September 1975. That is to say, decisions of the High Court of Australia, the Judicial Committee of the Imperial Privy Council, not being part of the common law of England, and indeed of the pre-independence courts of Papua New Guinea itself are not part of Papua New Guinea law; but decisions of the House of Lords, the English Court of Appeal, the English King's Bench and other English courts up until Papua New Guinea's independence are.

The "customary law" portion of the "underlying law" was contemplated by the original framers of the Constitution as deriving from the regional customs of the country in the same way as the common law of England (that law which was "common" to the whole country) had done prior to 1189, deemed to be "time immemorial" in English law. In practice the courts have found great difficulty in applying traditional custom in a modern legal system and the development of the customary law according to indigenous Melanesian conceptions of justice and equity has been less thorough than may have been anticipated in 1975. In 2000 the National Parliament enacted the Underlying Law Act 2000 which purports to mandate greater attention by the courts to custom and the development of customary law as an important component of the underlying law. Thus far the statute appears not to have effected such a result.

== Statutes ==
Statute law is very largely adopted from overseas jurisdictions. For example, the Criminal Code is adopted from Queensland; the Rules of Court are those of New South Wales; the Matrimonial Causes Act is the extremely old English statute of 1857 which had been in force in the Australian States before the federal Divorce Act, 1964; the Companies Act ch 146 was substantially the English Companies Act 1948; it was replaced by the Companies Act, 1997, adopted from New Zealand.

== Courts ==
The judicial system consists of village magistrates courts, which remain the only court remaining the administrative responsibility of the executive branch, district courts in urban centres presided over by stipendiary magistrates, the National Court which is the superior trial court and the Supreme Court which is functionally an appellate division of the National Court: it is not separately constituted, its Chief Justice is also the Chief Justice of the National Court and its bench consists of National Court judges sitting as an ad hoc appellate tribunal. The Supreme Court is the final court of appeal: an appeal lay from the pre-independence Supreme Court to the High Court of Australia (but not directly to the Privy Council); this was abolished at independence. The Supreme Court also has jurisdiction under the Constitution to give advisory opinions, called "references," on the constitutionality of legislation. In addition to its function as a trial court, the National Court also functions as a court of disputed returns hearing "Electoral Petitions" by unsuccessful candidates for Parliament; Leadership Tribunals hearing cases of alleged misconduct in office referred by the Ombudsman Commission consist of one National Court judge and two District Court magistrates.

The Supreme Court has a special responsibility for developing the "underlying law," i.e. the common law of Papua New Guinea, having resort to those rules of local custom in various regions of the country which may be taken to be common to the whole country. The responsibility has been given additional express warrant in the Underlying Law Act, 2000 which purports to mandate greater attention by the courts to custom and the development of customary law as an important component of the underlying law. In practice the courts have found great difficulty in applying the vastly differing custom of the many traditional societies of the country in a modern legal system and the development of the customary law according to indigenous Melanesian conceptions of justice and equity has been less thorough than may have been anticipated in 1975; the Underlying Law Act does not yet appear to have had significant effect.

Advocacy follows the conventions of the English common law world and is adversarial rather than inquisitorial; German law was wholly displaced by Anglo-Australian law in the former German New Guinea after 1914 when Australia seized the Territory and there are no traces of it in modern Papua New Guinea.

The Chief Justice of Papua New Guinea is The Honourable Sir Gibbs Salika, KBE.

Despite attempts to incorporate customary law, the writ of the 'National Courts' is felt less keenly in the more remote villages. Victims of crime can choose to have their cases heard in the national courts but this means transporting all those involved to the nearest town. Additionally, national courts hand down sentences that do not generally compensate the victim directly.

Melanesian custom tends to see crime as an offence against the victim and their family and community, more than an offence against the law. The affected family require compensation in the form of money or goods. In remote areas, Village Courts are the primary source of formal justice. The Village Courts grew from colonial systems, and were most recently redefined through the Village Courts Act of 1989. Five types of officials can be appointed through the provincial governments, with senior officer requiring gazetting at the national level through the Village Courts and Land Mediation Secretariat. The Village Court Act establishes the court's jurisdiction, but includes general jurisdiction over any events that would disturb order in the community. In practice, the Village Court's accessibility, especially in remote areas, creates tremendous pressures for actors to exceed their jurisdiction in order to provide some justice to isolated communities that would otherwise be isolated from assistance. In remote regions in which few people have paid employment it might seem that large fines would be unlikely to be paid. The system is usually extremely effective; many people will work in town at some stage in their life and then have savings. Fines are levied against the transgressor and family, who then join together to pay the fine. The victim's family generally feel satisfied that they have received restitution when they receive the fine, reducing the risk of subsequent fighting. Having paid the fine, the transgressor's family usually makes very sure that he behaves and may well make him slowly work to pay them back. The Committee Man is paid a fee for his time, generally by the person bringing the case.

In a remote environment with no police to back up and enforce his decision, the Committee Man needs diplomacy to make his verdict stick. Committee Men are individuals with sources of information about their local communities.

== The "Rooney Affair": An early crisis in relations between the executive and judiciary ==
The independence of the judiciary has been a particular problem in developing countries, though it was confirmed early in Papua New Guinea.

Papua New Guinea's Constitution purports to adopt the principle of the separation of powers, enunciated in US jurisprudence in an environment where the three branches of government are indeed separate, the executive not being responsible to the legislature. In PNG as in Australia, the principle is in fact somewhat artificially defined simply to mean that the judiciary is independent from executive interference, as established by the English Bill of Rights, 1689; however, the principle does not extend, as was established in Australia during the early years of the Australian federation, to preventing the courts from rendering advisory opinions to the executive; nor are there any implications with respect to the quasi-judicial function of administrative tribunals, also an issue at one time in Australia (see Separation of powers in Australia).

The principle was quickly tested in Papua New Guinea. In 1979, four years after Independence, the then-Minister of Justice, Mrs Nahau Rooney, wrote a widely circulated letter critical of what she perceived as a lack of sensitivity by the then entirely expatriate-personnel Supreme Court to a "growing national consciousness": in particular Mrs Rooney was impatient with the purportedly excessively legalistic approach of the Bench to the indigenising of the laws of Papua New Guinea; she was also critical of a Supreme Court Justice's enjoining of a deportation order by the Executive. The then-Chief Justice, Sir William Prentice, called a special sitting of the full bench to condemn the minister for what the court characterised as interference with judicial independence. Mrs Rooney responded by stating that she had "no confidence in the Chief Justice and other Judges....It appears that the foreign judges on the bench are only interested in administration of foreign laws and not the feelings and aspirations of the nation's political leaders." The court then convicted Mrs Rooney of contempt in respect of the initial letter and of scandalising the court in respect of the subsequent comments and sentenced her to eight months in prison. The Prime Minister released her on licence after she had served one day of her sentence and four judges including the Chief Justice promptly resigned, a fifth having previously resigned over a related matter.

The vacancies were, after a period of some uncertainty, filled by the first national justices, the new Chief Justice Buri Kidu, Mr Justice Mari Kapi (who eventually succeeded Kidu CJ), and Acting Justice Bernard Narokobi, together with expatriate justices who had had long experience in Papua New Guinea as trial lawyers or magistrates.

Three considerable ironies emerged in the long term from the Rooney Affair:

(1) The vigorous criticism of the Bench by a member of the executive (or indeed the general public) would certainly not have occasioned so drastic response by the judiciary in other common law jurisdictions such as Canada and the USA which also have a constitutionally-guaranteed right of freedom of expression.

(2) Notwithstanding the immediate departure of the old guard of colonial-era expatriate justices and their replacement by national justices, the Supreme Court did not then undertake any radical new departures by way of indigenising Papua New Guinea jurisprudence and indeed has been notably cautious in undertaking judicial law reform by way of implementing social policy. And

(3) Since the Rooney Affair members of the Executive have been notably timorous in articulating criticism of the Bench, notwithstanding extensive overseas jurisprudence permitting comment on the courts in countries with similar constitutional arrangements whose constitutions include near-identical guarantees of rights and freedoms to those contained in the Constitution of Papua New Guinea.

On the other hand, it must be said that legal commentators in the neighbouring common law countries of Singapore and Malaysia are — to the extent that they are aware of events in Papua New Guinea — somewhat admiring of the extent to which Papua New Guinea's judiciary has maintained its independence as this is unusual in their political environments.

In 2006 the independence of the judiciary was briefly challenged when Sir Arnold Amet, the immediately retired Chief Justice of Papua New Guinea, who was in the process of inaugurating a post-judicial political career, launched a series of articles in the Malaysian-owned newspaper The National in which he politically challenged the deliberations of the court over which he had formerly presided with respect to a capital case which was then sub judice. The newspaper was smartly reminded by the court that such challenge was likely to result in severe sanctions, and Sir Arnold withdrew.

== See also ==
- Human rights in Papua New Guinea
- Royal Papua New Guinea Constabulary

== Sources ==
- Weisbrot, D., Paliwala, A. and Sawyerr, A. Law and Social Change in Papua New Guinea (Sydney, 1982)
