= Buri Kidu =

Sir Buri Kidu, KBE (8 August 1945 – 30 January 1994) was the first national Chief Justice of Papua New Guinea.

== Biography ==
Buri Kidu was educated at Toowoomba Grammar School, Toowoomba, Queensland, Australia, where he was School Captain and at the University of Queensland, St Lucia, Queensland (LLB, 1970). His entire professional life was spent in Papua New Guinea. He was a Legal Officer in the Department of Law (1971–72), Acting Crown Prosecutor and Crown Prosecutor (1972), Senior Legal Officer (1972–74), Acting Crown Solicitor and Crown Solicitor (State Solicitor after Papua New Guinea Independence, 16 September 1975) (1974–76), Acting Secretary of Justice (1977), Secretary of Justice and Principal Legal Officer to the National Executive Council (Cabinet) (1978–79), Secretary, Prime Minister’s Department (1979–80) and Chief Justice of Papua New Guinea (1980–93).

He was appointed a Knight Bachelor (Kt) in 1980.

== Appointment and term as Chief Justice ==
Sir Buri was appointed Chief Justice in 1980 by the Government of Prime Minister Sir Julius Chan, who took office after the Government of Prime Minister Michael Somare had been defeated in a no-confidence motion in Parliament following the Rooney Affair, an early crisis of judicial independence during which the first Chief Justice, Sir Sydney Frost, an Australian, and three expatriate puisne justices resigned (see Law of Papua New Guinea).

During his term as Chief Justice Sir Buri secured independent financing of the judiciary, with a separate appropriation bill, so that its budget was not in the control of the Justice Minister from time to time. Indeed, during Sir Buri’s ten-year (plus three years) term of office as Chief Justice the superior courts of Papua New Guinea rigorously maintained an independent role for the courts vis-à-vis the executive and the legislature — a position which Lady Kidu (now Dame Carol Kidu) feels was vital in the decision of the Wingti Government to oust him as Chief Justice in 1993 when his statutory ten-year term had elapsed.

== Expiry of Term and Non-reappointment ==
In August 1993 Sir Buri's second term in office expired, and he was not reappointed by the Wingti Government (when he was two years short of the age qualification to receive a pension, leaving him without an income). Sir Buri was not advised that he was to be replaced, a default which had become standard practice in the Papua New Guinea public service but which Sir Buri had laboured to ensure would not be the case in the National Judicial Staff Services — Sir Buri had sought to keep the NJSS free of political influence — and he was left to infer it from the news that a new Chief Justice other than himself had been appointed.

It has been alleged that Sir Buri — who had come to office in the midst of a crisis as to the independence of the judiciary — was perceived as demanding more independence for the judiciary vis-à-vis the executive than the Wingti Government would have preferred, and that this was the reason his term as Chief Justice was not extended, at least to the point where he would have qualified for a pension. He died four months later of a heart attack. His widow, Lady Buri Kidu (now Dame Carol Kidu), now herself a political person of some note in Papua New Guinea, has suggested that political motivations during the premiership of Paias Wingti, then in office, as to the independence of the judiciary were brought to bear on Sir Buri's ouster as Chief Justice, and such matters bore considerably on her own decision to enter politics.

== Independence of the judiciary ==
The Constitution of Papua New Guinea left the judiciary of PNG in a somewhat anomalous position, deeming as it did the case law of the English superior courts as of the date of PNG Independence to be part of the "underlying law" of Papua New Guinea (i.e. the indigenous common law) whereas the decisions of the pre-Independence Supreme Court of Papua New Guinea were to be foreign law, on an equal footing as to persuasiveness with the decisions of other superior courts in countries having similar legal systems — most obviously Australia, but also New Zealand and Canada, as well as post-1975 England. This left the post-Independence PNG courts with somewhat a clean slate, though given that the immediately post-Independence Supreme and National Court personnel were the same as those who had occupied the Bench immediately prior to Independence, it was not immediately apparent that this was a conundrum.

With the Rooney Affair (see Law of Papua New Guinea) it became obvious that a watershed had been reached: would the judiciary now toe a political line, as in many other developing countries, or would it continue to be forthrightly independent of political interference?

In fact the Supreme and National Courts of PNG under Sir Buri Kidu stoutly maintained a firm adherence to judicial precedent as mandated by the Constitution, even to the extent of adhering to pre-1975 English precedent when Australian and other non-English common law jurisdictions had departed from such precedent (see Supreme Court of Papua New Guinea).

== Hierarchy of precedent ==
After the Rooney Affair it was a matter of some concern what direction the law of Papua New Guinea would take. Sir Buri quickly established that the mandate of the Constitution would stand and that even when its provisions as to the pre-1975 decisions of English courts might be out of keeping with arguably more sensible jurisprudence of jurisdictions of persuasive authority, such decisions must stand because that was what the Constitution mandated (see Supreme Court of Papua New Guinea).

Sir Buri quickly established that notwithstanding any implications of the Rooney Affair as to relations between the Executive and the Judiciary, the judiciary was wholly independent: Indeed, the hierarchy of case law precedent is that while the Supreme Court has authority to overrule any case authority, its own decisions are binding on the lower courts as are the decisions of the English superior courts prior to PNG's independence, which are deemed to be part of PNG's underlying law. The decisions of the pre-Independence Supreme Court of PNG are deemed to be foreign law, equivalent in authority to decisions by any foreign court with a similar legal system, and of persuasive value only.

The principle of the mere persuasiveness of other-than-English overseas (and pre-Independence PNG) authority vis-à-vis the binding authority of pre-1975 English authority has been compellingly reasserted in, for example, Toglai Apa and Bomai Siune v. The State [1995] PNGLR 43 that it is bound to follow the English case of Rookes v Barnard (House of Lords) [1964] AC 1129; [1964] 1 All ER 367 notwithstanding its having been comprehensively disapproved in both Australia and Canada soon after it was decided.

== Personal life ==
In 1969 Sir Buri married Carol Millwater of Brisbane, Australia, whom he had met at a fitness camp when they were high school students, he at Toowoomba Grammar School and she at Sandgate High School. They had six children. Sir Buri died of a massive heart attack on 30 January 1994, at the age of 48, five months after the elapse of his term of office as Chief Justice.

Lady Kidu entered Parliament in 1997 as Member for Moresby South and became Minister of Community Development. Lady Kidu was made a Dame Commander of the Order of the British Empire in 2005 and is now Dame Carol Kidu.

== Bibliography ==
- James, R.W. and Fraser, I. Legal Issues in a Developing Society. Waigani, NCD: Faculty of Law, University of Papua New Guinea, 1992.
- Kidu, Carol. A Remarkable Journey. N.p.: Longman, 2002.
- Weisbrot, D., Paliwala, A. and Sawyerr, A. Law and Social Change in Papua New Guinea. Sydney: The Law Book Company, 1982.

Legal offices
Preceded by William Prentice	Chief Justice of the Supreme Court of Papua New Guinea; 1980–1993	Succeeded by Sir Arnold Amet
