= Puri Ruing =

Puri Ruing is a Papua New Guinean politician. He was a member of the National Parliament of Papua New Guinea from 1997 to 2002 and from 2007 to 2012, representing the electorate of Dei Open. He served as Minister of Justice under Mekere Morauta, Minister for Internal Security under Michael Somare and Minister for Civil Aviation under Peter O'Neill.

Ruing, a former police officer, was first elected to parliament at the 1997 general election. He stood on the ballot line of the new People's Resources Awareness Party, but immediately joined the Christian Democratic Party upon his election. Ruing subsequently defected to the People's Democratic Movement. Ruing's election was the subject of an unsuccessful challenge in the Court of Disputed Returns by defeated candidate and former MP Melchior Pep. He was appointed Vice-Minister for Treasury and Finance in the Morauta government in September 1999, and was promoted to Minister of Justice in December 2000. He recontested the seat as the People's Democratic Movement candidate at the 2002 election, but was defeated by Pep, the losing candidate from 1997. Ruing had Pep briefly declared bankrupt in 2004 over his failure to pay court costs awarded over the unsuccessful 1997 challenge to his election. The bankruptcy orders were later quashed after Pep paid Ruing more than 70,000 kina to settle the debt.

Ruing won a rematch with Pep for the Dei Open seat at the 2007 general election for Morauta's Papua New Guinea Party, with Pep finishing third. His election was the subject of a challenge in the Court of Disputed Returns from second-place candidate Roy Pena. He was a shadow minister in the Morauta opposition to the Somare government for several years. In June 2009, his son, Emmanuel Ruing, was murdered in Port Moresby amidst clashes related to the Australian rugby league match, State of Origin. He was subsequently praised by Morauta for keeping control over potential retaliatory attacks. In July 2010, he defected from the Papua New Guinea Party to the United Resources Party, a coalition partner in the Somare government.

In December 2010, Ruing was appointed Minister for Internal Security under Michael Somare. In August 2011, Peter O'Neill became Prime Minister in the wake of a parliamentary motion of no confidence in the government of Acting Prime Minister Sam Abal (standing in for Sir Somare while the latter was hospitalised for a heart condition). O'Neill appointed Ruing as his Minister for Civil Aviation. Ruing was defeated by Westly Nukundj at the 2012 election.
