= Iova Geita =

Judge of the Supreme Court of Papua New Guinea

Honourable Justice Iova Geita

Judge of the Supreme Court of Papua New Guinea for Madang and Manus Provinces
- Incumbent
- Assumed office 25 June 2014

Iova Sebea Geita is a judge of the Supreme Court of Papua New Guinea for Madang Province and Manus Province.

He was sworn in by then Governor-General of Papua New Guinea, Sir Michael Ogio in on 25 June 2014 to serve a ten-year term. His term was extended by three years by attorney general Pila Niningi in May 2024 in recognition of his service. His areas of expertise are land law, family law, and youth and juvenile law.
