= Papua New Guinea Electoral Commission =

The Papua New Guinea Electoral Commission is the national institution responsible for elections in Papua New Guinea. It is an independent office established by the Constitution of Papua New Guinea. The commission is headed by an Electoral Commissioner, appointed by the Governor-General of Papua New Guinea on the advice of the Electoral Commission Appointments Committee. Patilias Gamato has been the Electoral Commissioner since November 2015.
