= Pacific Institute of Public Policy =

Think tank based in Port Vila, Vanuatu

- Abbreviation: PiPP
- Formation: 2007
- Type: Foreign Policy think tank
- Location: Port Vila, Vanuatu
- Executive Director: Derek Brien
- Website: www.pacificpolicy.org

The Pacific Institute of Public Policy (PiPP) is an independent, non-profit, regionally focused think tank based in Port Vila, Vanuatu. The stated aim of PiPP is to stimulate and support informed policy debate in the Pacific. A central feature of PiPP's model of engagement with policy stakeholders is the distribution of research via several media including: research syntheses, discussion papers, forums, public debates, social networking, audio and video podcasts, press, radio and television. PiPP was established on November 21, 2007, under the Vanuatu Charitable Associations (Incorporation) Act [CAP.140]. PiPP covers policy issues across the following Pacific Island Countries: Cook Islands, Federated States of Micronesia, Fiji, Kiribati, Marshall Islands, Nauru, Niue, Palau, Papua New Guinea, Samoa, Solomon Islands, Tonga, Tuvalu, Vanuatu

== Activities ==
=== Forums and debates ===
Many forums facilitated by PiPP occur via the 'MP Face to Face' programme, aimed at stimulating democratic dialogue through bringing politicians to their people in an open, public forum styled question and answer setting. Forums have been held across Vanuatu and have been broadcast live on Radio Vanuatu and Vanuatu's national television station (TBV).

A subregional version of the forum, known as Melanesia Face to Face, was held in Port Moresby, Papua New Guinea in 2011. Participants including the Governor of the Reserve Bank of Vanuatu, Dame Carol Kidu MP and the Director of the Melanesian Spearhead Group.

PiPP also holds Annual Pacific Debates; the inaugural event coinciding with the 41st Pacific Islands Forum meeting in Port Vila. The 2011 debate occurred in Auckland during the 42nd Pacific Islands Forum meeting held in Auckland and focused on urbanisation and economic growth in the Pacific.

=== Pacific Poll ===
In 2011, PiPP conducted polling which gauged public opinion on the Melanesian Spearhead Group (MSG), the level of support for West Papuan independence, and the nature of Melanesian identity. The poll also measured attitudes held towards Australia. This was the first poll carried out simultaneously across the four independent Melanesian countries.

== Policy focus areas ==
=== Trade ===
Throughout 2011, PiPP contributed to discussion surrounding Vanuatu's accession to the World Trade Organisation (WTO). And a report on the benefits of Vanuatu's WTO membership was published.

PiPP contributes to policy debate surrounding the Pacific Agreement on Closer Economic Relations (PACER Plus) with its insights cited in the media and considered by government departments including Australia's Department of Foreign Affairs and Trade (DFAT).

=== Information and communications technology ===
Since the telecommunications sector was opened to competition in 2007, PiPP has tracked the behavioural changes and trends in the use of mobile phones. The number of people owning and using mobiles is growing fast. Universal ownership is the most likely future.

=== Urbanisation ===
PiPP works together with organisations including United Nations Economic and Social Commission for Asia and the Pacific (UNESCAP) and the United Nations Human Settlements Programme (UN HABITAT). Apart from participation in the 2011 Pacific Urban Forum PiPP has raised awareness on Pacific urban issues via a 2011 discussion paper and media engagement on issues like urbanisation.

=== Election coverage ===
PiPP has been an active commentator on elections throughout the region, particularly during the 2008 Vanuatu elections which resulted in a fractured and splintered Parliament.

== Leadership and management structure ==
Derek Brien is PiPP's executive director and co-founder, and Nikunj Soni is the board chairman and founder. Board members include Dame Carol Kidu, DBE Dr (Hons), Matthew Morris, Kaliopate Tavola, Odo Tevi and Afamasaga Toleafoa. An Advisory Council exist to assist with research direction and policy agenda of the organisation with current members including diplomats, academics and high-level policymakers from throughout the Pacific and internationally.
