= Nahau Rooney =

Papua New Guinean politician (1945–2020)

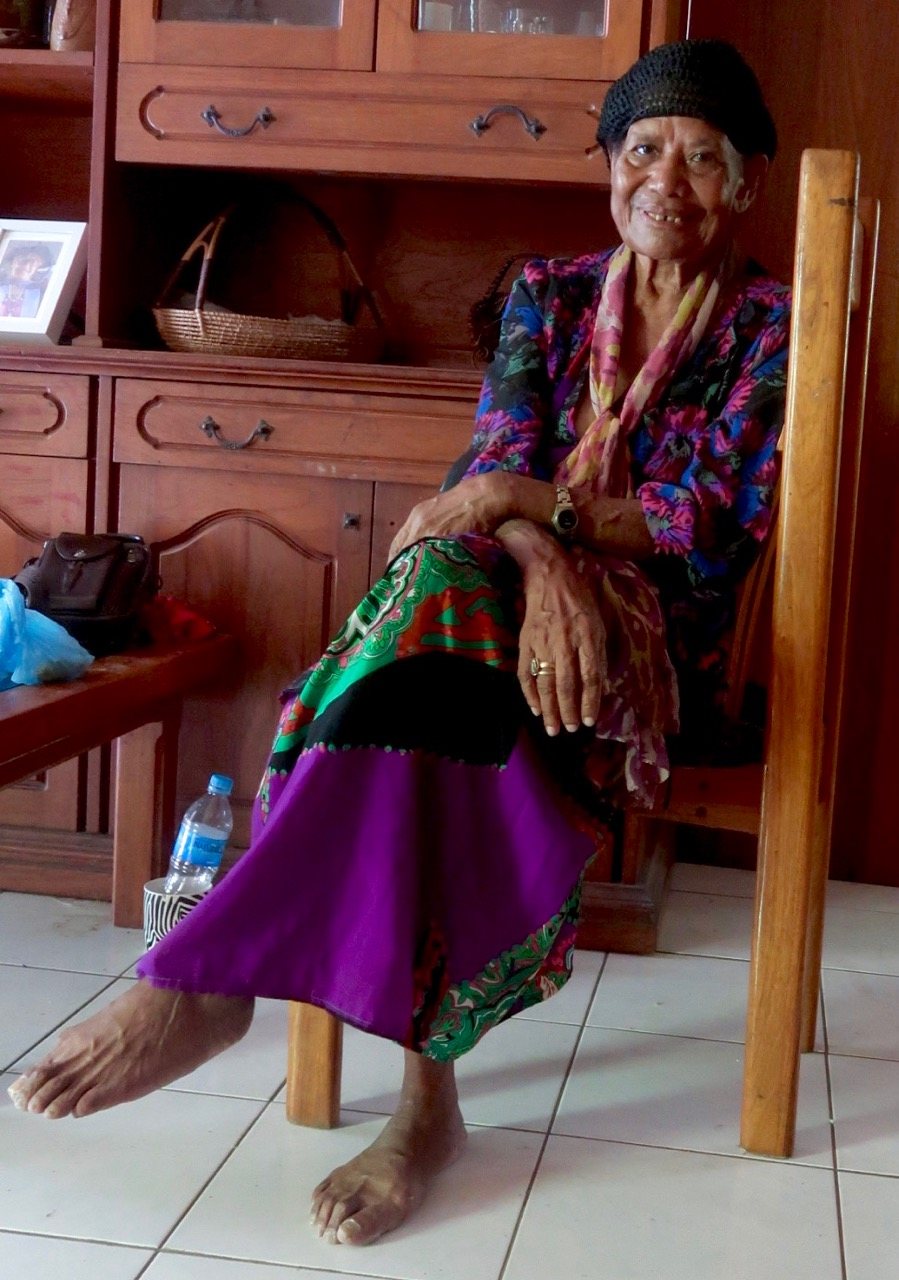
Rooney in 2020

Nahau Rooney, CSM (born in 1945 on Manus Island – died 15 September 2020 in Port Moresby) was a Papua New Guinean politician. From 1977 to 1987 she was a member of the newly founded post-independence National Parliament of Papua New Guinea.

== Early years and private life ==
Rooney was born in central Manus and grew up in M'bunai, a village on the coast of Manus, where she also attended elementary school in the early 1950s. After finishing Manus High School, she studied at Madang Teachers College. An Australian government scholarship enabled her to continue her studies in Melbourne. After completing her university education, she taught English and Home economics at Manus High School. There she met her future husband, the Australian Wes Rooney, who taught Science at the school. The couple married in 1969 and had six children together: Kevin, the researcher Michelle Nayahamui Rooney, Poyap, Gabriel, Nawes and Eva. Wes Rooney was murdered on Manus Island in 1990, specific details about his death are not known publicly.

== Political career ==
She was one of three women elected to the 109-member National Parliament of Papua New Guinea during the country's first post-independence general election, in 1977. She was re-elected in 1982, becoming the only female Member of Parliament at that time, but was never subsequently returned to Parliament. She represented the Manus Regional constituency in Manus Province. She was still an active politician in the 1990s, standing unsuccessfully for Parliament in the 1997 general election.

Following her election to Parliament in 1977, Rooney was initially responsible for the Ministry of Corrective Institutions and Liquor Licensing, and in 1979 she became Minister of Justice of Papua New Guinea in Prime Minister Michael Somare's Cabinet. In 1979, during her term as Minister, she wrote to director of Public Prosecutions Kevin Egan, "urging intervention" in reaction to politician and businessman John Kaputin being charged with failing to file company returns. As a result, the Supreme Court sentenced her to an eight-month jail term for contempt. She was immediately released on licence by Somare. She later served as Civil Aviation Minister.

In 1985, she co-founded the People's Democratic Movement (PDM) in Papua New Guinea. After leaving Parliament, she became director of the Forest Industries Council and deputy chairman of the Air Niugini board of directors. She was a member of organizations such as the Airlines Investigation Commission, the Council of the University of Papua New Guinea, the National Fiscal Economic Commission, the Law Reform Commission, the Pihi Manus Association and the Manus Provincial Government Assembly.

In the 2000s, having mostly retired from politics, she was running a guest lodge in Lorengau on Manus Island. She was also, however, President of the National Council of Women, and, in 2004, stood unsuccessfully for the position of Governor General.

In 2006, she was honoured with the title Companion of the Order of the Star of Melanesia.

Rooney died, aged 75, presumably as a result of a stroke, in the early morning hours of the day before the 45th Independence Day of Papua New Guinea, on 15 September 2020 at 6.30 a.m. at Port Moresby General Hospital.
