= Michelle Nayahamui Rooney =

Australian and Papua New Guinean development researcher

Michelle Nayahamui Rooney has dual Papua New Guinean and Australian nationality. She is a research fellow at the Development Policy Centre of the Australian National University and publishes extensively on matters relating to Papua New Guinea (PNG) and the Pacific islands.

== Early life ==
Michelle Nayahamui Rooney comes from Manus Province in PNG. Her mother, Nahau Rooney, was one of three women elected to the 109-member National Parliament of Papua New Guinea during the country's first post-independence general election in 1977 and the only woman elected in the subsequent election in 1982. Her father was Australian. He was murdered on Manus Island in 1990. She lived in Lorengau, the administrative centre of Manus Province, until 1984, when she was 12. Rooney obtained a bachelor's degree in economics from the Australian National University (ANU) in Canberra in 1994 and a master's in development economics from the University of Sussex in the UK in 1998.

== Career ==
After obtaining her master's, Rooney had various jobs, including with the United Nations Development Programme and with the World Bank, in PNG's capital, Port Moresby. In 2012 she registered to do a PhD at the Australian National University, obtaining a doctorate in 2017. Her PhD research examined migrants living in Port Moresby, using an interdisciplinary approach including anthropology, human geography and ethnography.

She is now a research fellow at the Development Policy Centre of the Crawford School of Public Policy, ANU, working under the ANU-University of Papua New Guinea Partnership Project. Themes in her research include migration, land ownership, livelihoods, social security, gender, and housing. Her research has been conducted in her home town of Lorengau, as well as in Port Moresby and PNG's second city of Lae. In Lorengau she examined the impact of Australia's offshore immigrant detention centre; in Port Moresby she has looked at migrant settlement communities, and in Lae she has researched family and sexual violence.

== Publications ==
Rooney is a prolific writer, both for academic journals and for broader circulation, such as on the Development Policy Centre website, in the Griffith Review, in Islands Business, and in The Independent. She also published blogs on the Analysis and Policy Observatory website. Her academic output includes:

- 2021. We Want Development: Land and Water (Dis)connections in Port Moresby, Urban Papua New Guinea. The Contemporary Pacific. 33, 1. p 1-30.
- 2021. As Basket and Papu: Making Manus Social Fabric. Oceania. 91, 1, p. 86-105.
- 2019. Sharing What Can Be Sold: Women Haus Maket Vendors in Port Moresby's Settlements. Oceania. 89, 2, p. 154-167
- 2018. (K) No (w) Boundaries: Returning through urban lands' seductions. Development Bulletin (Canberra). 80, p. 115-118
- 2017. Lewa Was Mama (Beloved Guardian Mother). In Transformations of gender in Melanesia. M. Macintyre, C. Spark (eds.). Canberra: ANU Press, p. 163-186
- 2017. Name, Shame and Blame: Criminalising Consensual Sex in Papua New Guinea. Journal of Pacific History. 52, 4, p. 537-539
- 2017. There's Nothing Better than Land: A Migrant Group's Strategies for Accessing Informal Settlement Land in Port Moresby. In Kastom, Property and Ideology: Land Transformations in Melanesia. Siobhan McDonnell, Matthew G. Allen, Colin Filer (eds.). Canberra: ANU ePress, p. 111-143
- 2015. Falling through the Net? Gender and Social Protection in the Pacific. Jolly, M., Lepani, K., Lee, H., Naupa, A. & Rooney, M. UN Women Discussion Paper, 6.
- 2015. Big Men Drink Beer; Drunk Big Men Do Not Hit Women. ANU Brief 2015/13.
- 2015. Money and Values in Urban Settlement Households in Port Moresby: Part 1: Money Is Important, So Are Children, Water and Firewood. ANU Brief 2015/18.
- 2015. Money and Value in Urban Settlement Households in Port Moresby Part 2: Understanding Spatial and Income Inequality Through Housing Choices. ANU Brief 2015/44.
- 2015. The Formal, the Informal, and the Precarious: Making a Living in Urban Papua New Guinea. Sharp, T., Cox, J., Spark, C., Lusby, S. & Rooney, M. SSGM Discussion Paper 2015/2
