= Carol Kidu =

Papua New Guinean politician

Dame Carol Kidu DBE AO
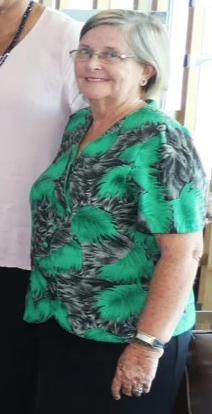
- Kidu in 2017

Member of the National Parliament of Papua New Guinea
- In office 1997–2012
- Preceded by: Albert Karo
- Succeeded by: Justin Tkatchenko
- Constituency: Moresby South Open

Personal details
- Born: Carol Anne Millwater; 10 October 1948 (age 78) Shorncliffe, Queensland, Australia
- Party: Melanesian Alliance Party
- Spouse: Buri Kidu
- Profession: School teacher

Dame Carol Anne Kidu DBE AO (née Millwater; born 10 October 1948), also known as Carol, Lady Kidu, is an Australian-born Papua New Guinean politician.

Kidu was the only female Member of Parliament in the 2002–2007 and 2007–2012 National Parliaments, and served as Minister for Community Development under Prime Minister Sir Michael Somare from 2002 until 2 August 2011, and as Leader of the Opposition from 15 February 2012 until her retirement from politics in July 2012. She was the leader of the Melanesian Alliance Party until her retirement.

Born in Shorncliffe, Brisbane, Queensland, Australia, she relocated to Port Moresby, Papua New Guinea after marrying Buri Kidu, who was knighted in 1980 upon his appointment as the first indigenous Chief Justice of Papua New Guinea. Lady Kidu became a teacher and wrote school textbooks. In 1994 her husband died of a heart attack.

== Political career ==
Lady Kidu entered politics in 1997, standing as an independent candidate in the parliamentary elections, and was elected Member of Parliament for the Port Moresby South constituency. She was re-elected in 2002 and 2007. In 2005, she was reportedly considered for the position of Deputy Prime Minister, but stated that she would not be interested in it.

In August 2011, the government of Acting Prime Minister Sam Abal (standing in for Somare while the latter was hospitalised for a serious heart condition) was brought down by a parliamentary motion, and Kidu lost office.

In January 2012, Kidu, a long-serving minister in the Somare government, distanced herself from those involved in attempts to overthrow Prime Minister Peter O'Neill’s government but stated that Somare's removal from power in August 2011 was illegal. At the same time, she announced her intention to sit as the opposition leader in parliament, in order to hold the Peter O'Neill-led government to account.

Kidu proposed forming a one-woman opposition and, in the absence of other contenders, to be recognised as Leader of the Opposition. Somare's party refused to take up opposition seats so as not to concede the legitimacy of the Peter O'Neill government.

On 15 February, Speaker Jeffrey Nape recognised her as leader of the Opposition, of which she was the only sitting member. She is the first woman to occupy that position. She stated she would use her remaining time in Parliament to consolidate the role of the Opposition for the future, hoping to obtain parliamentary staff for the Opposition, and a change in parliamentary procedures to strengthen it.

Kidu has been outspoken in her criticism of the controversial Judicial Conduct Law, rushed through by the O'Neill Government and Speaker Jeffrey Nape, which empowers the government to suspend judges. Questioning the judgment of the Speaker, Dame Carol called for a legislative reform that would require that the speaker be non-partisan and cannot be a serving MP. The Speaker accused her of contempt and targeted her for investigation.

Kidu chose not to re-contest her seat of Moresby-South in the 2012 general election and retired from politics at the end of her third term in July 2012. She is also a member of the High-Level Task Force for the International Conference on Population and Development (ICPD) and sits on the board of the Pacific Institute of Public Policy and the Nationwide Microbank.

== Awards and commendations ==
Carol, Lady Kidu was made a Dame Commander of the Order of the British Empire in January 2005. In February 2009, she was made a knight of the Légion d'honneur by France, for "her dedication to helping women, young girls, children, the physically and mentally impaired and her commitment to fighting discrimination". The first citizen of Papua New Guinea ever to receive this award, she accepted the award on behalf of the people of Papua New Guinea. Kidu was appointed an Officer of the Order of Australia (AO) in the 2023 Australia Day Honours for "distinguished service to human rights, to community development, and to international relations".

In 2007, the magazine Islands Business named her "Pacific Person of the Year", in recognition of her efforts towards poverty alleviation, against domestic violence and child abuse, against HIV and AIDS and in favour of women's empowerment.

Dame Carol Kidu received the PNG International Woman of Courage Award from the Secretary of State of the United States of America in 2007. She has received honorary doctorates from Vudal University (Rabaul, PNG), the University of Queensland (Australia) and the University of Papua New Guinea in recognition of her services to the people of Papua New Guinea.

National Parliament of Papua New Guinea
Preceded by Albert Karo	Member for Moresby South Open; 1997–2012	Succeeded by Justin Tkatchenko
Vacant Title last held by Belden Namah	Leader of the Opposition; 2012	Succeeded by Belden Namah
