= Arnold Amet =

Papua New Guinean politician and judge

Sir Arnold Karibone Amet
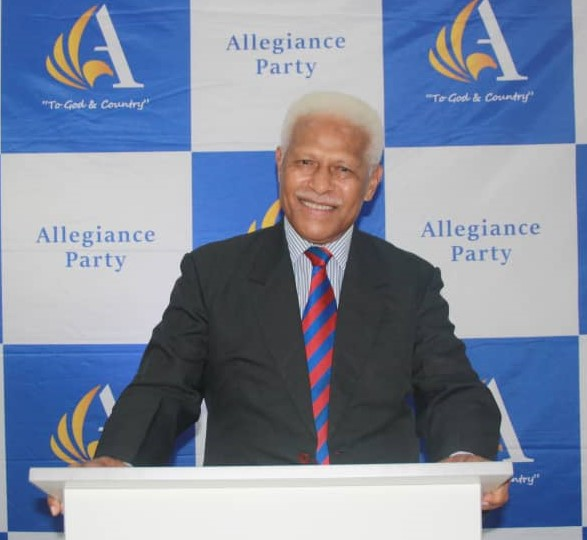
- Amet in 2021

Minister of Justice and Attorney General
- In office 2010–2011
- Prime Minister: Sir Michael Somare
- Preceded by: Allan Marat

Member of the National Parliament of Papua New Guinea
- In office 2007–2012
- Preceded by: Sir Peter Barter
- Constituency: Madang Province

Chief Justice of Papua New Guinea
- In office 1993–2003
- Preceded by: Sir Buri Kidu
- Succeeded by: Sir Mari Kapi

Personal details
- Born: 30 October 1952 (age 73) Papua New Guinea
- Profession: Lawyer

Sir Arnold Karibone Amet (born 30 October 1952 in Gial Village, Karkar Island, Madang Province, Papua New Guinea) is a Papua New Guinean former politician and judge. In 1971 he married Miaru Feareka, and they have five children. He was a member of the National Parliament of Papua New Guinea from 2007 to 2012, representing the Madang Provincial seat. He was Minister of Justice and Attorney-General from 2010 to 2011. Prior to entering politics, he was Chief Justice of Papua New Guinea. In February 2021 he was nominated as the Allegiance Party (Papua New Guinea) candidate for the seat of Moresby North West District but was unsuccessful in securing the seat. He was awarded Knight Bachelor for service to the judiciary, law and justice in 1993.

== Education ==
Amet completed his secondary education at The Armidale School in northern New South Wales, Australia, and graduated from the University of Papua New Guinea with a Bachelor of Law degree in 1975. He was admitted as a lawyer in Papua New Guinea in 1976.

== Career ==
After graduation, Amet joined the Public Solicitor's Office of Papua New Guinea as a lawyer (1976 - 1979). After a period as legal officer and corporate secretary for national airline Air Niugini, he rejoined the public services as first Associate Public Solicitor (1981) and subsequently Public Solicitor (1982) of Papua New Guinea. He was appointed as a Judge of the Supreme and National Court of Papua New Guinea in June 1983.

Amet was made Chief Justice of Papua New Guinea in 1993 at the age of 40, succeeding Papua New Guinea's first Chief Justice, Sir Buri Kidu. He completed his term in August 2003 and was succeeded by Sir Mari Kapi.

Amet was elected Governor of Madang Province in November 2007 as a member of the National Alliance. In December 2010 he was appointed Minister for Justice and Attorney General in Prime Minister Sir Michael Somare's Cabinet. He held this Ministry until the government was brought down by a parliamentary motion of no confidence in August 2011 during the 2011-2012 Papua New Guinean constitutional crisis whereupon he moved to the Opposition benches. He was defeated by Jim Kas at the 2012 election.

He has been appointed visiting Justice in the courts of Vanuatu, Fiji and Solomon Islands.

In February 2021, he was nominated as the Allegiance Party (Papua New Guinea) candidate for the seat of Moresby North West District, which required a byelection after the death of incumbent Member of Parliament, Sir Mekere Morauta.

Amet has held a range of leadership roles. He was Chairman of the Manam Humanitarian Committee, chair of the 2004 Commonwealth Observer Group for Solomon Islands' elections, and a member of the 2004 international Eminent Persons Group tasked with assessing the political and human rights situation in Fiji following its 2000 military coup.

== Environmental activism ==
Amet has been active in campaigning on a range of environmental issues affecting his home province of Madang.

In 2020, he led efforts to stop a sand mining operation proposed by Singapore-based company Niugini Sands Ltd. on 38 kilometers of black sand beach in Sungilbar, Madang Province. Amet said that mining the sands would impact on thousands of people and threaten the environment, including the breeding grounds of endangered leatherback turtles. Amet wrote to the Department for Justice to request an extension of community consultation and for deeper engagement with authorising agency the Minerals Resource Authority, and said that court proceedings would be filed if required.

Amet had previously been vocal in opposing the proposed deep-sea sand-mining project, Solwara 1, which ultimately failed.

In April 2011, Amet organised a meeting in Madang so that landowners potentially affected by changes to the Madang Pacific Marine Industrial Zone could express their views and concerns to members of the government. A heated exchange of words took place between Amet and then Member for Madang Open Ken Fairweather after Fairweather and other Members of Parliament arrived several hours late to the consultation.

Legal offices
Preceded by Sir Buri Kidu	Chief Justice of the Supreme Court of Papua New Guinea; 1993–2003	Succeeded by Sir Mari Kapi
