= Gibbs Salika =

Sir Gibuna Gibbs Salika KBE (born 11 August 1955) is the current Chief Justice of Papua New Guinea. He is currently the longest serving judge of the National and Supreme Court of Papua New Guinea.

== Honoured by Queen Elizabeth II ==
Salika, a Seventh-day Adventist, was honoured as a Knight Commander of the Order of the British Empire in 2014 by Queen Elizabeth II on her birthday for his service as a Deputy Chief Justice of the Supreme Court of Papua New Guinea.

== Notable cases ==
With great public approval, Deputy Chief Justice Gibbs Salika found guilty Gulf Province Governor Havilo Kavo, Member of Parliament for Komo-Magarima Francis Potape, Minister for National Planning and Member for Pomio District Paul Tiensten, Commissioner of Police Tom Kulunga and former National Provident Fund board chairman Jimmy Maladina over the National Provident Fund scandal between November 1998 and July 1999.

== Appointed to the Office of Chief Justice of Papua New Guinea ==
Prime Minister Peter O'Neill announced that Salika would replace Sir Salamo Injia as the new Chief Justice of Papua New Guinea for a term of 10 years. Salika was sworn in to office on 29 November 2018.

In January 2025, Salika suggested that Western Province be split into two, stating that it was too large for effective government.

Legal offices
Preceded by Sir Salamo Injia	Chief Justice of the Supreme Court of Papua New Guinea; 2018-present	Incumbent
