= Salamo Injia =

Sir Salamo Injia GCL is a retired Judge and former Chief Justice of Papua New Guinea. Injia was knighted in 2006 and appointed Chief Justice of the Supreme Court of Papua New Guinea in 2008, succeeding Mari Kapi. In 2018, Sir Gibbs Salika replaced him as the Chief Justice of Papua New Guinea. In August 2019, Injia was appointed chair of a commission of inquiry into a controversial state loan of US$1,200,000,000 from the Swiss bank UBS used by the PNG government to buy a stake in the resource company Oil Search.

== Controversies ==
=== Election of Peter O'Neill ===
On 9 November 2011, Sir Salamo Injia was suspended from the position of Chief Justice by the government after allegations that he had breached a contempt order and mismanaged court finances. At the time, the Supreme Court was deciding on the constitutionality of the election of Peter O'Neill as Prime Minister of Papua New Guinea. In response, the Supreme Court ordered the arrest of O'Neill supporters, Deputy Prime Minister Belden Namah and Attorney-General Dr Allan Marat. The pair were briefly imprisoned.

In December 2011, Sir Salamo Injia was one of five judges who presided over the Supreme Court decision that ruled that Prime Minister O'Neill did not follow due constitutional process when he ousted former Prime Minister Sir Michael Somare on 2 August 2011. The government made numerous attempts to remove Injia from the Supreme Court case, citing a conflict of interest.

=== Judicial Conduct Bill ===
On 22 March 2012 Prime Minister O'Neill's administration introduced a new law, the Judicial Conduct Bill, empowering the government to suspend judges by referring them to a tribunal. The bill was passed by parliament, 24 hours after it was introduced. Opposition commentators have criticised the new law as being designed to remove Injia from the Supreme Court. Sir Barry Holloway, the former speaker of parliament, commented that while many had welcomed the ascension of the O'Neill government because of O'Neill's promised clampdown on corruption, O'Neill's on-going battle with the judiciary had "cost it a lot of the public goodwill it enjoyed when it first assumed power".

In May 2012, Injia and Justice Nicholas Kirriwom were arrested on charges of "sedition", having been part of a three-man bench who ruled that Somare is PNG's rightful leader. A police unit led by Deputy Prime Minister Belden Namah stormed the court in an attempt to arrest Injia. This has caused alarm with the Australian Bar Association, which has called on the government of PNG to reaffirm the independence of its nation's judges.

In August 2012, the charges against Injia were dropped, following a letter from Prime Minister O'Neill to the Police Commissioner, Tom Kulunga, which requested that the proceedings against each of the judges charged be discontinued. O'Neill, who had originally lodged the complaint against Injia, said that the decision was "in the best interest of the country and the people."

=== Justice Timothy Hinchliffe ===
In March 2012 Injia was arrested by the police, charged with obstructing a police investigation into his alleged intervention into the 2009 handling of the estate of the deceased judge, Justice Timothy Hinchliffe. Police alleged that Injia illegally redirected into court coffers 213,000 Papua New Guinean kina (US$100,000) meant for Hinchliffe's adopted son, Timothy Sarri.

The police chief defended the arrest, which was effected by armed officers, explaining that Injia had ignored repeated requests to attend an interview with the police about the execution of Hinchliffe's will.

A week later, amid increasing criticism from political and judicial circles that the arrest of Injia was politically motivated, the National Court of Papua New Guinea issued a permanent stay on proceedings against Injia, calling the charges an abuse of process. The court also issued a restraining order stopping police from arresting Injia again. The National Court found that the payments managed by Injia in relation to Justice Hinchliffe's estate had been authorised by Timothy Sarri.

Legal offices
Preceded by Mari Kapi	Chief Justice of the Supreme Court of Papua New Guinea; 2008–2018	Succeeded by Gibbs Salika
