= William Prentice =

PNG Chief Justice (1919–2004)

Sir William Thomas Prentice MBE, QC (1 June 1919 – 31 January 2004) was a Chief Justice of Papua New Guinea and a Justice of the Supreme Court of Papua New Guinea.

== Early life and education ==
Prentice was born in Ermington, New South Wales, a suburb of Sydney, one of six children to Claud S. and Pauline (née Pearson) Prentice, whose marriage was registered in Randwick in 1912.

He attended St. Joseph's College, Hunters Hill where he captained the senior debating team and matriculated in 1935 winning a scholarship to study arts and law at Sydney University. He was active in the Campion Society at Sydney University and joined the Sydney University Regiment. Following active service in WWII resumed his legal studies, graduated and was admitted to the Bar 1947. He had an active practice from Wentworth Chambers in Sydney.

== War service ==
In 1940 he volunteered for the AIF. He was commissioned and served in the 7th Division, 2/33 Battalion in the Middle East. He was recalled to support the militia in the defence of Australia and was involved in the Owen Stanley campaign and fought on the Kokoda Track as a staff captain with 7th Division HQ. He was mentioned in dispatches and was awarded an MBE for his service on the Kokoda Track. He was with the 7th Division at Lae and Bougainville.

== New Guinea career ==
Following WWII, Prentice became a member of the Council of Papua New Guinea Affairs, responsible for the promotion of legal education for Papua New Guineans. He was influential in the establishment of the Faculty of Law at the University of Papua New Guinea.

In 1970 Prentice was appointed a Justice of the Supreme Court of Papua New Guinea and served on that court for 10 years. He was appointed successively senior puisne judge in 1975 and chief justice in 1978. His period on the bench transected the momentous years of change through self-government, independence and post-independence. Prentice was responsible for many leading judgments, particularly in the area of constitutional interpretation, which have had a profound effect on the development of the law in Papua New Guinea. He was knighted in 1977.

In 1978 Prentice presided over a traffic accident case in which Morrie Modeda - accused of a dangerous driving charge, occasion a man's death - was hacked to death by relatives of the deceased as he and court party including Prentice attended an inspection at the site of the accident. In the concluding proceedings Prentice termed the action "cold-blooded, planned treachery" and described it as a "lawless and disgraceful episode".

In March 1980, Sir William Prentice resigned as Chief Justice in controversial circumstances relating to the Rooney crisis - a constitutional crisis that tested the principle of the separation of powers. Prentice and four other judges resigned over the affair. He returned to Australia where he served for some years as a senior member of the Administrative Appeals Tribunal. He retired from active practice in 1987.

== Personal ==
Prentice's maternal grandfather William Pearson was a successful Sydney bookmaker and owner of the prizewinning thoroughbred Amounis who on his death in 1938 left a £100,000 estate to his daughter Pauline, Prentice's mother.

A devout Catholic, William Prentice was a member of the Thomas More Society for 55 years and served as councillor and honorary secretary in 1952-54. He was appointed an honorary life member and participated in the silver jubilee celebrations of the society in 1994-95. Prentice married Mary Dignam in 1946 and they had four children. Before and after his New Guinea posting he lived in the Sydney suburb of Naremburn. He died in February 2004, Mary had predeceased him by six months.
