= Allan Marat =

Papua New Guinea politician

Allan S. M. Marat CBE (born 28 September 1954) is a Papua New Guinean politician. He served as Minister for Justice and Attorney General in Prime Minister Michael Somare's Cabinet from August 2007 to May 2010. In May 2010, he publicly stated that major mining projects in the country brought little benefit to local communities, workers or businesses. He also "questioned legislation affecting the Ombudsman Commission". Prime Minister Somare consequently asked him to resign immediately, which he did. As a consequence of his resignation, Marat informed the Prime Minister that his Melanesian Liberal Party would "cut ties" with the government. He was replaced as Attorney General and Justice Minister by Ano Pala.

He has also served previously as Deputy Prime Minister and Acting Governor-General.

In August 2011, Peter O'Neill became Prime Minister in the wake of a parliamentary motion of no confidence in the government of Acting Prime Minister Sam Abal (standing in for Somare while the latter was hospitalised for a heart condition). O'Neill appointed Marat as his Minister of Justice, and Attorney General.

In November, as the Supreme Court prepared to hear a case on the legitimacy of the O'Neill government, Deputy Prime Minister Belden Namah ordered the suspension of Chief Justice Sir Salamo Injia, as Injia was facing charges of "breaching a contempt order, and mismanaging court finances". The government said Injia's removal had nothing to do with the pending case on the government's legitimacy. The Supreme Court responded by ordering Namah's arrest, and that of Allan Marat.

He was, for a time, leader of the People's Progress Party, until he was ousted from that position in October 2003. He is now a member of the Melanesian Liberal Party.

He was the first Papua New Guinean to obtain a doctorate in law at the University of Oxford. His thesis was on the "official recognition of customary responses to homicide in Papua New Guinea".

Marat was appointed Commander of the Order of the British Empire (CBE) in the 2009 Birthday Honours for "service to law, the national government and the East New Britain community".

Political offices
Preceded by Michael Ogio	Deputy Prime Minister of Papua New Guinea; 2002–2003	Succeeded by Andrew Baing
