= Supreme Court of Papua New Guinea =

Highest court of Papua New Guinea

The Supreme Court of Papua New Guinea has been the highest court of Papua New Guinea since 16 September 1975, replacing the pre-Independence Supreme Court (corresponding to the post-Independence National Court) and the overseas appellate tribunals from 1902 to 1975 of the High Court of Australia and the Judicial Committee of the Privy Council. Judges of the pre-Independence Supreme Court automatically became the first justices of the National Court and accordingly among the pool of judges that were available to be empanelled as a Supreme Court bench.

== Establishment and composition ==
The Supreme Court was established as a superior court of record under Papua New Guinea's Constitution. The Chief Justice of Papua New Guinea, Deputy Chief Justice and the judges of the National Court (excluding acting judges) comprise the Court.

Not separately constituted, the Supreme Court is an appellate committee or "full court" of the National Court, which is the superior-level trial court. Judges of the National Court form panels of the Supreme Court on an ad hoc basis to hear appeals from the National Court, appeals from assorted administrative tribunals, and to hear references in the Supreme Court's original jurisdiction.

== Reference jurisdiction and the separation of powers ==
In the latter case the Court is, strictly speaking, not exercising a judicial function but rather, pursuant to the ruling of the Judicial Committee of the Privy Council in Attorney-General of Ontario v Attorney-General of Canada (Reference Appeal) [1912] AC 571, one of advising the executive branch of government, a jurisdiction expressly conferred on the Supreme Court by Papua New Guinea's Constitution. Other jurisdictions, notably the USA (federally, though not in all states) and Australia, eschew the reference function for their courts on the grounds that it violates the principle of the separation of powers as among the legislative, executive and judiciary; in Canada, it is held that the principle is inapplicable in a parliamentary democracy.

The constitutional convention which deliberated on the drafting of Papua New Guinea's Constitution immediately prior to Independence took counsel from Canadian academics and the reference procedure was readily adopted. In Papua New Guinean jurisprudence, as in Australia, the formula "separation of powers" is frequently referred to. However, as in Australia (and unlike in the USA where the principle was enunciated and where the executive is not responsible to the legislature) it has a special limited application, being confined to describing the well-established convention of an independent judiciary, dating from the English Bill of Rights 1689: the executive is, of course, responsible to the legislature in Papua New Guinea's Parliament.

== Developing the underlying law ==
The Supreme Court (together with the National Court) has a special responsibility for developing the underlying law, i.e. the common law of Papua New Guinea, having resort to those rules of local custom in various regions of the country which may be taken to be common to the whole country. The responsibility has been given additional express warrant in the Underlying Law Act 2000 which purports to mandate greater attention by the courts to custom and the development of customary law as an important component of the underlying law. In practice the courts have found great difficulty in applying the vastly differing custom of the many traditional societies of the country in a modern legal system and the development of the customary law according to indigenous Melanesian conceptions of justice and equity has been less thorough than may have been anticipated in 1975; the Underlying Law Act does not yet appear to have had significant effect. An ardent proponent of the underlying law, David Gonol in his book titled The Underlying Law of Papua New Guinea: An inquiry into adoption and application of customary law expounded at length on these issues. Further, in the 2017 Third National Underlying Law Conference, many notable speakers expressed similar sentiments that the underlying law is not being developed at sufficient pace.

== Hierarchy of precedent ==
The hierarchy of case law precedent is that while the Supreme Court has authority to overrule any case authority, its own decisions are binding on the lower courts as are the decisions of the English superior courts prior to Papua New Guinea's independence, which are deemed to be part of Papua New Guinea's underlying law. Decisions of the pre-Independence Supreme Court of Papua New Guinea are deemed to be foreign law, equivalent in authority to decisions by any foreign court with a similar legal system, and of persuasive value only. The principle of the mere persuasiveness of overseas (and pre-Independence Papua New Guinea) authority vis-à-vis the binding authority of pre-1975 English authority has been applied many times in, for example, Toglai Apa and Bomai Siune v The State [1995] PNGLR 43 that it is bound to follow the English House of Lords case of Rookes v Barnard [1964] AC 1129 on the ineligibility of plaintiffs to an award of exemplary damages against ministers of the state or public servants other than in strictly limited circumstances, notwithstanding its having been decisively overruled by both the High Court of Australia and the Supreme Court of Canada.

Appeals from some of the various Supreme Courts within the Commonwealth to the Judicial Committee of the Privy Council were abolished by Ireland as the Irish Free State in 1933, Canada in 1949, India in 1950, Nigeria in 1963, Guyana in 1970, Ceylon in 1971, Australia federally in 1968, and from Australian States in 1975. They accordingly did not exist from the High Court of Australia when Papua New Guinea was granted independence, and consideration of appeals to London from Papua New Guinea did not arise. Canadian appeals to the Privy Council were often heard by an Australian judge and vice versa; admirable cases decided in the other country are occasionally followed as are parliamentary statutes adopted even yet though seldom expressly acknowledged.

== Chief Justice ==
The Chief Justice of Papua New Guinea, appointed under Papua New Guinea's Constitution by the Governor-General of Papua New Guinea on behalf of King Charles III in his capacity as King of Papua New Guinea, presides over the Supreme Court and the National Court.

The independence of the Bench was tested in 1979 during the Rooney Affair (see Law of Papua New Guinea), whose outcome was the resignation of Sir William Prentice, the second (and expatriate) Chief Justice of Papua New Guinea together with three other expatriate judges.

Sir Buri Kidu then became the first native-born Chief Justice (1980–1993). At the end of his ten-year term, Kidu was succeeded by Sir Arnold Amet (1993–2003). Amet was succeeded by Sir Mari Kapi, who served as Chief Justice from August 16, 2003 until his resignation in 2008 for health reasons. Kapi was succeeded the same year by Sir Salamo Injia. In 2018, Sir Gibbs Salika succeeded Injia in becoming the fifth national Chief Justice of Papua New Guinea.

=== List ===
No.	Name	Term start	Term end	Comment
1	Beaumont Phillips	23 November 1954	January 1957	Australian expatriate.
2	Alan Harbury Mann	20 May 1957	20 June 1970	Australian expatriate; died in office.
3	John Minogue	5 July 1970	19 April 1974	Australian expatriate.
4	Sydney Frost	13 February 1975	November 1977	Australian expatriate; first post-independence chief justice.
5	William Prentice	1977	1980	
6	Buri Kidu	1980	1993	First native-born chief justice.
7	Arnold Amet	1993	2003	
8	Mari Kapi	16 August 2003	2008	
9	Salamo Injia	2008	2018	
10	Gibbs Salika	29 November 2018		

== Judges ==
As of 28 January 2026, the following judges, in order of seniority, comprise the Supreme Court of Papua New Guinea:

1. Chief Justice Chief Sir Gibuma Gibbs Salika, GCL, KBE, CSM, OBE (Port Moresby & Central - Circuit basis)
2. Deputy Chief Justice Ambeng Kandakasi, GCL, CBE (Port Moresby)
3. Justice Panuel Marangas Mogish, CSM (Port Moresby & Kavieng - Circuit basis)
4. Justice David Lionel Cannings, CBE (Port Moresby)
5. Justice Allen Kinsley David, CMG (Port Moresby)
6. Justice George Sulai Manuhu, CSM (Kokopo & Kavieng - Circuit basis)
7. Justice Derek Richard Hartshorn, ML (Port Moresby)
8. Justice Joseph Malinu Yagi, CMG (Port Moresby & Kavieng - Circuit basis)
9. Justice Colin Kenway Makail (Port Moresby)
10. Justice Ere Kariko, CBE (Port Moresby & Kavieng - Circuit basis)
11. Justice Jacinta Joan Murray (Lae)
12. Justice Berna Joan Collier (Port Moresby)
13. Justice John Alexander Logan, RFD (Port Moresby)
14. Justice Lawrence Kangwia, ML (Lae)
15. Justice Iova Sebea Geita (Port Moresby & Daru/Kiunga/Tabubil/Kerema - Circuit basis)
16. Justice Peter Chanel Toliken (Buka)
17. Justice Sir Kina Bona, KBE (Alotau)
18. Justice Hitelai Dorothy Polume-Kiele (Lae)
19. Justice Kenneth Manarua Frank (Wewak)
20. Justice Ravunama Auka, MPS (Popondetta - Circuit basis)
21. Justice Daniel Yale Liosi (Kundiawa)
22. Justice Thomas Anis (Port Moresby)
23. Justice Oagile Bethuel Key Dingake (Port Moresby)
24. Justice Teresa Berrigan (Port Moresby)
25. Justice Nicholas Miviri, DPS (Port Moresby)
26. Justice John Richie Benaud Kaumi (Goroka)
27. Justice John Kamane Numapo (Port Moresby & Central - Circuit basis)
28. Justice Vergil Los Narokobi (Madang)
29. Justice Paulus Mapa Dowa (Lae)
30. Justice Paul Kima Tusais (Kokopo & Kavieng - Circuit basis)
31. Justice Nerrie Pinau Eliakim (Mt. Hagen & Jiwaka/Minj - Circuit basis)
32. Justice John Carey (Port Moresby & Mendi/Walume - Circuit basis )
33. Justice Susan Purdon-Sully (Port Moresby)
34. Justice Derek Wood (Port Moresby & Mendi/Walume - Circuit basis)
35. Justice Laura Wawun-Kuvi (Goroka)
36. Justice Karen Carmody (Port Moresby)
37. Justice Nicholas Cooper (Kimbe)
38. Justice Andrew Kostopoulos (Tari)
39. Justice Joseph Crowley (Mt. Hagen & Jiwaka/Minj - Circuit basis)
40. Justice Pauline Bre (Port Moresby)
41. Justice Larrisa Andelman (Kimbe)
42. Justice Rebecca Christensen (Kokopo & Kavieng - Circuit basis)
43. Justice Graham Ellis (Wabag)
44. Justice Rangajeeva Wimalasena (Port Moresby)
45. Justice Silas Kaule (Mt. Hagen & Jiwaka/Minj - Circuit basis)
46. Justice Jefferey Mesa (Wewak)
