= Members of the National Parliament of Papua New Guinea, 2022–2027 =

This is a list of members of the 11th National Parliament of Papua New Guinea, as elected at the 2022 election. The parliament is Unicameral, and is composed of 89 members from "open" electorates (single member districts) and 22 Governors from Provincial electorates, making 111 members in total.

== Leadership ==
Speaker	Job Pomat, Pangu since 2 August 2017
Prime Minister	James Marape, Pangu since 30 May 2019
Leader of the Opposition	Joseph Lelang, PNC since 12 August 2022

== Members ==
There are 22 provincial members, who represent the province and also are Governors of the province. This includes the Capital district and the autonomous region of Bougainville. Within the provinces, there are also single member districts called opens.

Member	Party	Province	Seat	Term in office
Highlands Region
Simon Sung Sing Sia	People's National Congress	Eastern Highlands	Governor	2022–present
William Hagahuno	United Resources Party	Eastern Highlands	Kainantu Open	2022–present
Ekime Mek Gorosahu	United Resources Party	Eastern Highlands	Daulo Open	2022–present
Robert Atiyafa	People's National Congress	Eastern Highlands	Henganofi Open	2012-present
Saki Hacky Soloma	Pangu Pati	Eastern Highlands	Okapa Open	2017–present
John Boito	Pangu Pati	Eastern Highlands	Obura-Wonenara Open	2007–2012; 2022–present
Kinoka Hotune Feo	Independent	Eastern Highlands	Unggai-Bena Open	2022–present
Simon Kilepa	United Resources Party	Eastern Highlands	Lufa Open	2022–present
Aiye Tambua	Pangu Pati	Eastern Highlands	Goroka Open	2017-present
Sir Peter Ipatas	People's Party	Enga	Governor	1997–present
Aimos Joseph Akem	Pangu Pati	Enga	Lagaip-Porgera Open	2022-present
Sir John Pundari	Liberal Party	Enga	Kompiam-Ambum Open	1992–present
Mikki Kaeok	Pangu Pati	Enga	Wapenamanda Open	2022–present
Lino Tom	People's Party	Enga	Wabag Open	2017–present
Don Polye	Triumph Heritage Empowerment Party	Enga	Kandep Open	2002–2017; 2021 - 2025
Maso Karipe (Note: Maso Karipe died in office in 2023. He was replaced by his son, Gridiron Maso Karipe in a 2025 by-election.)	Independent	Enga	Pogera-Paiela Open	2022-2023
Gidron Maso Karipe	Independent	Enga	Pogera-Paiela Open	2025-present
Noah Kool	Liberal Party	Chimbu	Governor	2012–2017, 2022–present
Francis Kikin Siune	Pangu Pati	Chimbu	Kerowagi Open	2022–present
Francis Alua	National Party	Chimbu	Karimui-Nomane Open	2022–present
Lucas Dawa Dekena	National Party	Chimbu	Gumine Open	2012–present
Muguwa Dilu	Advance PNG	Chimbu	Kundiawa-Gembogl Open	2022–present (Note: Suspended for a period of time as former MP William Onglo challenged the results of his election. A court found that his suspension was illegal, and reinstated him in March of 2026.)
James Nomane (Note: First elected as an independent, then joined the PANGU party. Appointed as Vice Minister assisting the Prime Minister in 2022, and Deputy Opposition Leader in 2024.)	Independent	Chimbu	Chuave Open	2022–present
Kerenga Kua (Note: Also serves as Minister for Petroleum.)	National Party	Chimbu	Sinasina-Yongomugl Open	2012–present
William Powi	Pangu Pati	Southern Highlands	Governor	2012–present
Maina Maita Yawi Pano	Social Democratic Party	Southern Highlands	Kagua-Erave Open	2022–present
Peter O'Neill	People's National Congress	Southern Highlands	Ialibu-Pangia Open	2002–present
Billy Joseph	Social Democratic Party	Southern Highlands	Nipa-Kutubu Open	2022–present
Raphael Tonpi	United Labour Party	Southern Highlands	Mendi Open	2022–present
Pila Kole Niningi	Pangu Pati	Southern Highlands	Imbonggu Open	2012–present
Philip Undilalu	Pangu Pati	Hela	Governor	2012–present
William Bando	United Resources Party	Hela	Koroba-Lake Kopiago Open	2022–present
Daniel Tindipu	Pangu Pati	Hela	Komo Hulia Open	2022–present
Manasseh Quiz Makiba	Pangu Pati	Hela	Magarima Open	2017–present
James Marape (Note: Also serving as prime minister.)	Pangu Pati	Hela	Tari-Pori Open	2007–present
Simon Kaiwi	United Resources Party	Jiwaka	Governor	2022–present
Wake Goi	People's Party	Jiwaka	Jimi Open	2017–present
Benjamin Mul	Independent	Jiwaka	North Waghi Open	2007–2012; 2022–present
Joe Kuli	United Resources Party	Jiwaka	Angalimp-South Waghi Open	2017–present
Wai Rapa	United Resources Party	Western Highlands	Governor	2022–present
Jacob Kop Maki	Pangu Pati	Western Highlands	Mul-Baiyer Open	2022–present
Win Bakri Daki	Pangu Pati	Western Highlands	Tambul-Nebilyer Open	2017–present
William Marra Duma	United Resources Party	Western Highlands	Hagen Open	2002–present
Steven Pim (Note: Steven Pim died in 2023, and Desmond Paul Kipa was elected in a 2026 by-election to replace him.)	People's National Congress	Western Highlands	Dei Open	2022–September 2023 (died)
Desmond Paul Kipa	Independent	Western Highlands	Dei Open	2026-present
Islands Region
Peter Tsiamalili Jr.	Pangu Pati	Bougainville	Governor	2017–present
William Nakin	National Alliance Party	Bougainville	North Bougainville Open	2017–2022 (died)
Francesca Semoso	Pangu Pati	Bougainville	North Bougainville Open	2023–present
Timothy Masiu	Pangu Pati	Bougainville	South Bougainville Open	2012–present
Simon Dumarinu (Note: Simon Dumarinu died in 2024. He was replaced in a by-election in 2025 by Jimmy Miringtoro.)	Social Democratic Party	Bougainville	Central Bougainville Open	2017-2024 (died)
Jimmy Miringtoro	Independent	Bougainville	Central Bougainville Open	2025-present
Michael Marum	Independent	East New Britain	Governor	2022-present
Elias Kapavore	People's National Congress	East New Britain	Pomio Open	2015–present
Ereman ToBaining Jr.	People's National Congress	East New Britain	Kokopo Open	2017–present
Jelta Wong	United Resources Party	East New Britain	Gazelle Open	2017–present
Allan Marat (Note: Selected as MP for Rabaul after a recount due to a close race between Marat and Graham Piniau Rumet of the Pangu Pati. Rumet was initially declared the winner, but Marat was sworn in on 25/05/23.)	Melanesian Liberal Party	East New Britain	Rabaul Open	2023-present
Charlie Benjamin	Pangu Pati	Manus	Governor	2012–present
Job Pomat	People's National Congress	Manus	Manus Open	2007–2012, 2017–present
Sir Julius Chan	Peoples Progress Party	New Ireland	Governor	2007–present
Walter David Schnaubelt	National Alliance Party	New Ireland	Namatanai Open	2017–present
Ian Ling-Stuckey	Pangu Pati	New Ireland	Kavieng Open	1997-2002; 2017–present
Sasindran Muthuvel	Pangu Pati	West New Britain	Governor	2017–present
Freddie Reu Kumai	People's Party	West New Britain	Talasea Open	2022–present
Joseph Lelang	People's National Congress	West New Britain	Kandrian-Gloucester Open	2012–present
Francis Galia Maneke	Pangu Pati	West New Britain	Nakanai Open	2017–present
Momase Region
Allan Bird	Independent	East Sepik	Governor	2017–present
Johnson Wapunai	People's National Congress	East Sepik	Ambunti-Dreikikir Open	2017–present
Gabriel Kapris	People's National Congress	East Sepik	Maprik Open	2012–2023 (died)
Libert Kapris (Note: After Gabriel Kapris' death in 2023, Libert Kapris was elected to the seat in a 2024 by-election.)	People's First Party	East Sepik	Maprik Open	2024-present
Kevin Isifu	United Resources Party	East Sepik	Wewak Open	2017–2022 (died)
Stanley Muts Samban (Note: Samban was elected in a by-election in October 2023 after the death of Kevin Isifu.)	Social Democratic Party	East Sepik	Wewak Open	2023-present
Salio Waipo	Pangu Pati	East Sepik	Angoram Open	2012–present
Joseph Yopyyopy (Note: Also serving as education minister.)	Melanesian Alliance Party	East Sepik	Wosera-Gaui Open	2012–present
Richard Maru (Note: Also serves as Minister for International Trade and Investment.)	People's First Party	East Sepik	Yangoru-Saussia Open	2012–present
Ramsey Pariwa	People's First Party	Madang	Governor	2022–present
Alexander Suguman Orme	United Resources Party	Madang	Sumkar Open	2022–present
Kansol Harwai Kamdaru	Pangu Pati	Madang	Middle Ramu Open	2022–present
Robert Naguri	Pangu Pati	Madang	Bogia Open	2017–present
Kessy Sawang	People's First Party	Madang	Rai Coast Open	2022–present
Bryan Kramer	Allegiance Party	Madang	Madang Open	2017–present
Jimmy Uguro (Note: Jimmy Uguro died in office in 2024. Vincent Kumura was elected to replace him in a 2025 by-election.)	Pangu Pati	Madang	Usino-Bundi Open	2017–2024 (died)
Vincent Kumura	Independent	Madang	Usino-Bundi Open	2025-present
Luther Wenge	People's Labour Party	Morobe	Governor	1997–2012; 2022–present
Theo Albert Pelgen	People's First Party	Morobe	Nawae Open	2022–present
Marsh Narewec	PNGD Party	Morobe	Wau-Waria Open	2022–present
Patrick Basa	People's National Congress	Morobe	Kabwum Open	2017-present
Sam Basil Jr.	United Labor Party	Morobe	Bulolo Open	2022–present
Koni Iguan	United Labour Party	Morobe	Markham Open	2012–present
Solen Loifa	Independent	Morobe	Menyamya Open	2022–present
Kobby Bomareo	Pangu Pati	Morobe	Tewae-Siassi Open	2017–present
Jason Peter	United Resources Party	Morobe	Huon Gulf Open	2022–present
Rainbo Paita	Pangu Pati	Morobe	Finschhafen Open	2017–present
John Rosso (Note: Also serves as Deputy Prime Minister)	Pangu Pati	Morobe	Lae Open	2017–present
Tony Wouwou	National Alliance Party	West Sepik	Governor	2017–present
Belden Namah	Papua New Guinea Party	West Sepik	Vanimo-Green River Open	2007–present
Joe Sungi	Pangu Pati	West Sepik	Nuku Open	2012–present
Solan Mirisim	Pangu Pati	West Sepik	Telefomin Open	2012–present
Anderson Mise	United Resources Party	West Sepik	Aitape Lumi Open	2025-present
Southern Region
Rufina Peter	People's National Congress	Central	Governor	2022–present
Ano Pala	Pangu Pati	Central	Rigo Open	2007–2017, 2022–present
Peter Isoaimo	National Alliance Party	Central	Kairuku Open	2014–present
Keith Iduhu	New Generation Party	Central	Hiri-Koiari Open	2022–present
Casmiro Aia	Pangu Pati	Central	Goilala Open	2022–present
Puka Temu	Our Development Party	Central	Abau Open	2002–2003, 2004–present
Chris Haiveta	Pangu Pati	Gulf	Governor	1997–1998, 2002–2007, 2017–present
Thomas Opa	Pangu Pati	Gulf	Kerema Open	2022–present
Soroi Eoe	Pangu Pati	Gulf	Kikori Open	2017–present
Gordon Wesley	People's National Congress	Milne Bay	Governor	2007–present
Ricky Morris	People's National Congress	Milne Bay	Alotau Open	2022–present
Douglas Tomuriesa	People's National Congress	Milne Bay	Kiriwina-Goodenough Open	2012–present
Isi Henry Leonard	Pangu Pati	Milne Bay	Samarai-Murua Open	2017–present
Jimmy Maladina (Note: Resigned in July 2024 following sexual assault allegations. Replaced by Energy minister Thomas Opa.)	Pangu Pati	Milne Bay	Esa'ala Open	2022–2024
Thomas Opa	Pangu Pati	Milne Bay	Esa'ala Open	2024-present
Powes Parkop	Social Democratic Party	National Capital District	Governor	2007–present
Lohia Boe Samuel	Pangu Pati	National Capital District	Moresby North-West Open	2017–present
John Kaupa	Pangu Pati	National Capital District	Moresby North-East Open	2017–present
Justin Tkatchenko	Social Democratic Party	National Capital District	Moresby South Open	2012–present
Garry Juffa	People's Movement for Change	Northern	Governor	2022–present
David Arore	People's National Congress	Northern	Ijivitari Open	2007–2015; 2015–2017; 2022–present
Richard Masere	Greens Party	Northern	Popendetta Open	2017–present
Henry John Amuli	Pangu Pati	Northern	Sohe Open	2017-present
Taboi Awi Yoto	Pangu Pati	Western	Governor	2017–present
Maso Hewabi	Independent	Western	Middle Fly Open	2022–present
Agena Gamai	Papua New Guinea Party	Western	Delta Fly Open	2022–present
James Donald	People's Reform Party	Western	North Fly Open	2017–present
Sekie Agisa	Pangu Pati	Western	South Fly Open	2017–present
