= Telefol =

Telefol, Telefomin, or Telefolmin may refer to:

- Telefol people
- Telefol language

== See also ==
- Telefomin
- Telefomin District
