= Afekan =

Goddess in the Tifalmin mythology of Papua New Guinea

Afekan is the goddess of creation and knowledge in the Tifalmin mythology of Papua New Guinea. Afekan lived with men in the beginning to teach them "how to live in strength and dignity", along with the secrets and rituals of men. She also created taro, pigs, and various cultural things. She has a brother, Umoim, who became the first man to die.

Afekan is equivalent to the goddesses Afek of the Telefol and Mountain Ok people, Karigan of the Faiwol people, Paatakanib or Fitipkanib of the Mian people, and Fiitiir by the Bimun-Kuskusmin people.

Afekan is the namesake of a crater at 25.8°N 200.3°W on Titan.
