= Min people =

Min people may refer to:

- Speakers of Min Chinese, a variety of Chinese originating in Fujian province
- The people of Minyue, an ancient Baiyue kingdom in present-day Fujian from which Min Chinese gets its name
- Mountain Ok people, otherwise known as the Min people of Sandaun Province of Papua New Guinea
