= Mountain Ok =

Mountain Ok may be:

- Mountain Ok people
- Mountain Ok languages
