= Telefomin District =

- Location within Papua New Guinea
- Coordinates: 5.129°S 141.636°E
- Country: Papua New Guinea
- Province: Sandaun Province
- Capital: Telefomin

Government
  - MP: Solan Mirisim

Area
  - Total: 13,810 km^{2} (5,330 sq mi)

Population (2024 census)
  - Total: 63,479
  - Density: 4.597/km^{2} (11.91/sq mi)
- Time zone: UTC+10 (AEST)

Telefomin District is a district of Sandaun Province of Papua New Guinea. Its capital is Telefomin. Its inhabitants include the Mountain Ok people, a cultural group with numerous sub-groups including the Telefol, the Urapmin, and the Wopkaimin. The Oksapmin also live in this district. Notable ethnographic research by Geoffrey B. Saxe at UC Berkeley has documented the encounter between pre-contact uses of number and its cultural evolution under conditions of monetization and exposure to schooling and the formal economy among the Oksapmin.
