= List of ministers of coffee for Papua New Guinea =

Minister of the Coffee of Papua New Guinea
- Incumbent; William Bando since January 18, 2024
- Status: Active
- Appointer: The Prime Minister
- Formation: August 24, 2022
- First holder: Joe Kuli
- Unofficial names: Ministry of Coffee

The following is a list of ministers of coffee for Papua New Guinea. The first holder was Joe Kuli, who was appointed to the newly established office of the Ministry of Coffee by Prime Minister James Marape for coffee production.

== List ==
Minister of Coffee for Papua New Guinea
| No. | Name | Entered office | Left office | Ref. | Prime Minister |
|---|---|---|---|---|---|
| 01. | Joe Kuli | August 24, 2022 | January 18, 2024 | | James Marape |
| 02. | William Bando | January 18, 2024 | Incumbent | | James Marape |
