= Mian people =

People living in Telefomin district, Sandaun province, Papua New Guinea

Mian
Total population
- 3,500

Regions with significant populations
- Papua New Guinea; Sandaun province, Telefomin district

Languages
- Mian, Tok Pisin

Related ethnic groups
- Bimin, Faiwol, Nakai, Setaman, Suganga, Tifal, Telefol, Urapmin

The Mian people (Mianmin) are a people living in the Telefomin district of the Sandaun province in Papua New Guinea. The number of Mian is 3,500, based on the number of speakers of their language, Mian.

The Mian are living in small villages in mountainous areas with rainforest and rivers; conditions which makes transport very limited, almost only restricted to walking, which, however have helped them retain their traditional way of life, based on hunting and agriculture, including slash-and-burn. They grow sweet potatoes, sago, bananas, pineapples, breadfruits, pawpaw, sugarcanes, pumpkins and squashes, and in more recent times, also oranges, tomatoes, beans, peanuts and coconuts. Animals they hunt and catch include pigs, cassowaries, birds, fish, snakes and small reptiles. Hunting is exclusively for men, while the women are normally the ones preparing the food.

== Digital resources ==
Fedden, Sebastian; Timothy Feist; Matthew Baerman; Greville G. Corbett; Gunter Senft (2015). "Mian". Mian and Kilivila Collection (Data Set). University of Surrey. doi:10.15126/SMG.30/1.
