= Joe Kuli =

Papua New Guinean politician

Minister for Correctional Service
- Incumbent
- Assumed office January 18, 2024
- Prime Minister: James Marape
- Preceded by: Win Bakri Daki

Minister of Coffee for Papua New Guinea
- In office August 23, 2022 – January 18, 2024
- Appointed by: James Marape
- Prime Minister: James Marape
- Preceded by: Office established
- Succeeded by: William Bando

Personal details
- Born: Waghi Valley, Jiwaka
- Citizenship: Papua New Guinea
- Party: United Resources Party

Joe Kuli is a Papua New Guinean politician who served as the first Minister of Coffee for Papua New Guinea from August 2022 until a cabinet reshuffle in January 2024, where he was appointed as Minister of Correctional Services. He is currently affiliated with the United Resources Party.

== Political career ==
Kuli first began his career from representing the Anglimp-South Waghi district during the 2017 Papua New Guinean general election in the 10th National Parliament. He was re-elected in the 2022 Papua New Guinean general election representing the same district.

In August 2022, he was appointed as the newly established Minister of Coffee by Prime Minister James Marape. He planned working to make an increase within coffee production.

== Personal life ==
Kuli was reported to be from the Waghi Valley in Jiwaka.
