= Ambilineality =

Ambilineality is a form of kinship affiliation of cognatic descent that relies on self-defined affiliation within a given social system, meaning individuals have the choice to be affiliated with their mother's or father's group. Common features of societies that practice ambilineality are a shared set of land, communal responsibilities, and collective ownership of some segments of wealth and debt in their societies. This system of descent is distinct from more common genealogical structures in that rather than determining affiliation and descent using the standard determinants of biological and genealogical relation, it instead relies heavily on voluntary affiliation with one's group, oftentimes being determined by factors including residence.

Societies practicing ambilineal descent are especially common in Southeast Asia and the Pacific Islands. Polynesian cultures and Micronesian cultures are often ambilineal, including, for example, Samoans, Māori, Hawaiians and people of the Gilbert Islands. The indigenous peoples of Northwestern North America are also followers of ambilineality; and it is also found among the Southern Yoruba people residing in West Africa.

== Family ==
Ambilineality is a cognatic descent system in which individuals may be affiliated either to their father's or mother's group. This type of descent results in descent groups which are non-unilineal in the sense that descent passes either through women or men, contrary to unilineal descent, whether patrilineal or matrilineal. Affiliation to a descent group will be determined either by choice or by residence. In the latter case, children will belong to the descent group with whom their parents are living.

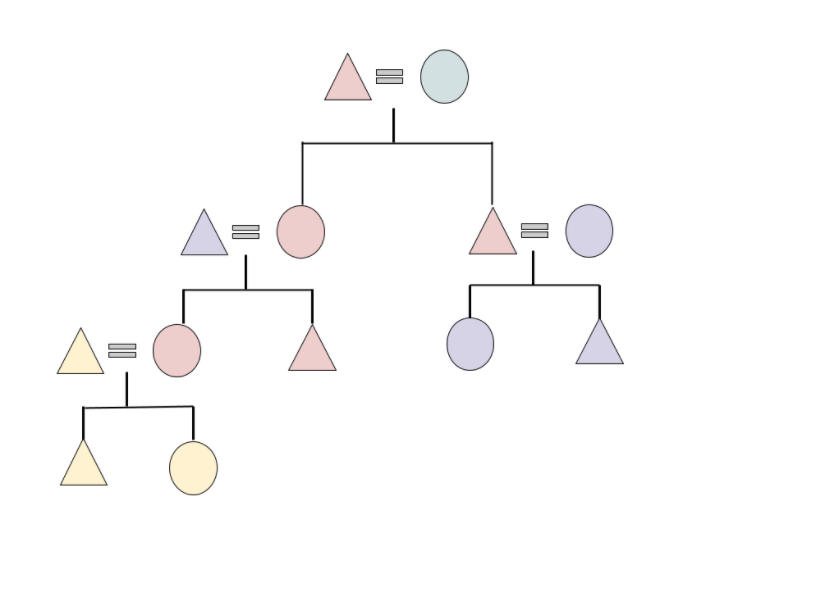
Diagram of an ambilineal descent in a family

== Property relations ==
Generally, an ambilineal descent group consists of known descendants who can trace their line of descent, through either the male or female line, to the individual who was given usage rights over the land.

The grantee's descendants have absolute usage rights to a portion of land. If they are residents, they are to be appointed to leadership and administration positions relating to the governance of the land. Those living descendants of the chosen ancestor who follow these claims to land comprise an ambilineal descent group with corporate interests in the land granted to the ancestor.

Similarly, inheritance is acquired through mother and father and property is transmitted through both sons and daughters, as all genders have the right to inheritance.

== Kinship system ==
As a kinship system, ambilineality uses genealogy to trace descent either through the mother or the father. There is no set order in an ambilineal system to which the last name is chosen, and individuals may use both parents as links to a kin. In several cultures, such as the Tiwa, the choice of whether to associate with the male or female family is a personal decision.

The choice of which familial line to trace descent may be influenced by culture. Societies may have a law or cultural customs determining whether to trace descent through the mother or father for a child's surname. This choice and tradition influences practices of the culture regarding which kin to associate with. Emphasis on descent through the female line came about because of people's interest in whitening their lineage since Brazilian women frequently married white European immigrants. Brazil did have an ambilineal system, but there was an underlying matrilineal emphasis. This was particularly common in the first hundred years of European colonization, particularly in Brazil. It was due to the Iberian concept of “purity of blood” (Spanish: limpieza de sangre) and their dislike of “infected” races such as Jews or Moors.

== Social functions ==
In an ambilineal descent system the members can choose and change their affiliation or clan. This means that membership in an ambilineal group is associated with more freedom and is less binding and restricting than in unilineal descent groups. The flexibility of the descent group enables people to exercise a greater choice in their behavior towards kinsmen, especially distant kins. Furthermore, a person can choose whether or not they will honor their group responsibilities.

The ambilineal system also gives way to a more variable group membership and a more flexible group structure. Oftentimes people use the ability of choice to realign themselves with the more powerful or higher status option. For example, in the Togan people of the Northern Gilbert Islands it is common for a couple, with differing social status, to join the descent group with the higher status.

== Naming system/surnames ==
The naming system in an ambilineal descent system allows for either using the mother or father's last name for the children or both, which is common in Latin America. Many societies have laws or strong cultural norms which dictate a child's surname. For example, in the U.S., it is the cultural custom for a child to have the father's surname, but in cases where the parents are not married, it is common for the child to take the surname of the mother. In the U.S., due to divorces and subsequent marriages, the surnames of children can also change.

There is an ambilineal naming system in Spain and many Latin American countries, but with an implicit patrilineality. Children have both their mother and their father's surnames, but grandchildren use their father's and mother's paternal surnames. In Brazil, the choice of surnames also has ambilineal tendencies. It depends on the personal desires of the parents or the person themselves, and modifying them was common in the first hundred years of colonization. However, it was the cultural tendency to use both the mother and the father's surnames following the general Spanish practice.

In the Tiwa, it is a “personal choice” whether to live in the mother or father's home, indicating which “clan” they will join. Based on this choice, the children inherit the mother or father's surname when born into the respective clans. These choices reflect the understanding of belonging and identity.

== Kinship terms ==
There have been disagreements on the topic of kinship terminology in ambilineal descent systems. While ambilineal kinship terminology is oftentimes described as either generational or using cross-generational relative age criterion, there is some push back on these ideas.

Anthropologists have found that in ambilineal systems (such as those in Samoa) membership is often based on kinship criteria, but that one's role or label within the ambilineal group can be based on non-kinship criteria. This means that to determine if an individual is kin or not, genealogical criteria are often used, but once the individual is determined to be kin other (non-kinship) criteria will be used to designate a specific kin term. These kin distinctions within a group do not have any significance on the individual station as kinsmen. Because ambilineal sometimes do not have role allocation based on the “differentiation of kin-types” and kinship terminologies are based on such non-kin criteria some scholars have argued that in these groups kinships terms should not be used as terms of address.

== Ambilineality in specific ethnic groups and regions ==
=== In the Americas ===
==== Brazil ====
In Brazil, ambilineality is seen in choosing the surname of children, where it is common that a child takes both parents' surnames. During the first hundred years of colonization, it was common for families to trace lineage through matrilineal descent because of their interest in whitening their lineage. The Portuguese were concerned about the purity of blood, (see: limpieza de sangre) because of Jewish persecution and brought these ideas to Brazil. The European immigrants were primarily males until the 1800s; therefore, "mixed-blood" daughters could whiten their lineage by marrying and having children with white European immigrants. Over time, the generations became whiter and could, therefore, amass more power in Brazilian society. The Portuguese husbands provided more whiteness for the offspring, but the children would typically adopt the maternal surname if the wife's family were wealthier and more established. This is particularly true when the wife came from one of the more prominent families. Taking the mother's name identified the child as part of the family and gave access to the same power of the family.

=== Ethiopia ===
The Christian Amhara trace their descent ambilineally. They are considered as kin relatives from both the mother and father's side. Any Amhara is thus the descendant of a set of lineages which multiply rapidly back through the generations. The Amhara confer rights of inheritance on both sexes, recognize inheritance though both father and mother, and transmit goods through both sons and daughters. Whereas men and women have equal rights in theory, in practice, this does not always hold.

Ambilineal descent also occurs amongst the Tegrefifin speakers who border the Amhara to the north although they have a clear bias in favor of the men. Nevertheless, their rules of inheritance and descent mean that Christian Ethiopians lack the patrilineal, narrow descent groups of western Christianity, and have a set of rules for transmitting property which tends towards radical fragmentation.

Amongst the Christian Abyssinians, marriage happens outside the first seven degrees of consanguinity and work hard to live up to this rule. The laity seldom marry in church, instead marrying by secular contract under customary law. Polygyny was common amongst the Abbysnian nobility, characterized by rough equality. They lacked a strong sense of legitimacy or bastardy for children. Moreover, amongst Ethiopians, women had the right to initiate divorce and to take a share of the property from their marriage upon divorce.

Abyssinian families are distinguished from other traditional Christian families by their prevalence of divorce and a pronounced ambilineality. However, they also have a strong culture of monogamy amongst Christian priests and their lay counterparts.

=== In Asia ===
==== India ====
In the Tiwa (Lalung) people who live at the Assam-Meghalaya border area in India, ambilineal descent is evident through their marriage and residence practices. At marriage each couple has the choice to join the wife or husband's clan. There are no set rules as to which house a couple occupies after marriage but, among the Tiwa people, gobhia (husband joining the wife's house) is more common than poari (wife joining husband's house). Any children born to the couple belong to the group chosen at the time of marriage. This means that an individual inherits the mother's name if born into her house or the father's name if born into his house.

There is a spiritual dimension to ambilineal descent in Tiwa culture. Membership and affiliation to a descent group is expressed via surname (and domestic belonging/residence associated) as well as connection to deities. The Tiwas believe that there are numerous deities that inhabit the home. At birth a child inherits the house's descent group and the bonds that have been established between the god inhabiting the home. This affiliation with the deities serves as a principal criteria for lineage identification because the individual is associated with all of the houses within the descent group that are worshipping the same group deity. For example, two individuals who have the same surname could claim unrelatedness if they do not worship the same group deity.

=== In Oceania ===
In the Northern Gilbert Islands of Butaritari and Makin, which are in Micronesia, ambilineal descent systems are evident. In both groups ambilineal descent is understood through land ownership, occupation, and inheritance. Membership in an ambilineal descent group, often called a ramage, includes those who can trace their descent (through either the female or male line) to the founder of the group, as well as individuals who can trace their descent to the founder and have inherited land rights to a part of the founder's estate. In this system an individual is not a member of every group they can genealogically trace kinship to. Rather, membership depends on land possession within the group. Upon marriage, couples have the choice in which group they want to join.

Ambilineal systems are also found in Samoa, Tonga and with Māori people in New Zealand. Similarly to Butaritari and Makin, land ownership and inheritance is the basis for membership and affiliation in a descent group, but in these three systems membership is most often based on the male line. In this system, both the mother and father can be used for affiliation with a particular descent group, but emphasis is placed on the father. While it is most desirable for membership into the father's group female links are also used especially when aligning with the female line brings increased power, wealth, or social standing.

== See also ==
- Hawaiian kinship
- Unilineality
- Family
- Cultural anthropology

== Bibliography ==
- Firth, Raymond. (1957). "A Note on Descent Groups in Polynesia". Man. 57: 4–8. doi:10.2307/2795045. JSTOR 2795045.
- Firth, Raymond. (1963) “Bilateral Descent Groups: An Operational Viewpoint.” In Studies in Kinship and Marriage. Dedicated to Brenda Z. Seligman on Her 80th Birthday., edited by Isaac Schapera, 22–37. London: Royal Anthropological Institute of Great Britain & Ireland.
- Firth, Raymond. (1929) Primitive Economics of the New Zealand Maori. New York: E.P. Dutton.
- Goodenough, Ward H. (1970) Description and Comparison in Cultural Anthropology. Chicago: Aldine :55-58.
- Lambert, B. (1966) “Ambilineal Descent Groups in the Northern Gilbert Islands1.” American Anthropologist 68 (3): 641–664.
- Lloyd, P.C. (1966) “Agnatic and Cognatic Descent Among the Yoruba.” Man 1 (4): 484–500.
- Ramirez, Philippe. (2014) People of the Margins: Across Ethnic Boundaries in North-East India. Guwahati: Spectrum:88-98.
- Goodenough, Ward H. (1970) Description and Comparison in Cultural Anthropology. Chicago: Aldine :55-58.
- Coult, A. (1964). Role Allocation, Position Structuring, and Ambilineal Descent. American Anthropologist, 66(1), new series, 29–40.
- Maynes, Mary Jo. Gender, Kinship, Power: a Comparative and Interdisciplinary History. Routledge, 1996.
- Kernan, K., & Coult, A. (1965). The Cross-Generation Relative Age Criterion of Kinship Terminology. Southwestern Journal of Anthropology, 21(2), 148–154.
- Ellis, E. (1980). The Choice of Children's Surnames. Anglo-American Law Review, 9(1), 92–99. https://doi.org/10.1177/147377958000900105
- Crummey, D. (1983). Family and Property amongst the Amhara Nobility. The Journal of African History, 24(2), 207–220.
- Hoben, A. (1963). The role of ambilineal descent groups in Gojjam Amhara social organization. University Microfilms, Inc.
