= Billy Joseph =

Papua New Guinean politician (born 1984)

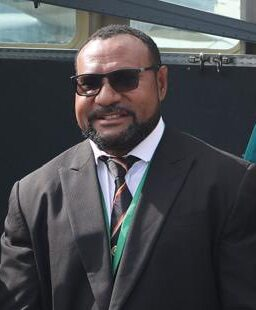
- Joseph in August 2025

Minister of the Papua New Guinea Defence Force
- In office January 19, 2024 – April 9, 2026
- Monarch: Charles III
- Prime Minister: James Marape
- Preceded by: Win Bakri Daki
- Succeeded by: Elias Kapavore

Deputy Chairman of Economic Affairs
- In office February 9, 2022 – January 19, 2024

Personal details
- Born: William Billy Joseph; 24 September 1984 (age 42)
- Citizenship: Papua New Guinea
- Party: Social Democratic (DS)
- Education: University of Papua New Guinea
- Occupation: Politician

William Billy Joseph (born 24 September 1984) is a Papua New Guinean politician and former surgeon who served as the Minister for Defence of Papua New Guinea from January 2024 until his resignation in April 2026.

First elected in the 2022 Papua New Guinean general election to represent the Nipa-Kutubu District, he became deputy leader of the Social Democratic Party. Following a cabinet reshuffle on January 19, 2024, he was appointed the Minister for Defense, taking over from Win Bakri Daki.

In April 2026, he resigned from his position to allow for an investigation into allegations that he had interfered with army recruitment.

== Early life and education ==
William Billy Joseph was born on 24 September 1984. Joseph holds a Bachelor of Medicine and a Bachelor of Surgery from the University of Papua New Guinea School of Medicine and Health Sciences, and went on to become a medical doctor. Upon his election in 2022, he was the fourth doctor in the National Parliament of Papua New Guinea.

== Political career ==
In the 2022 Papua New Guinean general election, Joseph was elected as MP for the Nipa-Kutubu District. In an interview with The National, he stated that work in politics was an extension of medical work, as doctors "deal with all kinds of problems that people bring to the hospital". He cited violence against women and outdated medical infrastructure as examples of such problems, noting how the COVID-19 pandemic had strained the medical system. He joined fellow doctors Wabag MP Dr. Lino Tom, Tewai-Siassi MP Dr. Kobby Bomareo, and Abau MP Dr. Sir Puka Temu in Parliament.

That September, he became Deputy Chairman of Economic Affairs, and joined the Parliamentary Committee on Law and Order, Public Works and Public Accounts. He is Deputy Party Leader of the Social Democratic Party.

=== Minister for Defense ===
He was appointed Defense Minister during the shuffle of the PNG Parliament's cabinet on January 19, 2024, and began his term on the same day under the Marape-Rosso cabinet.

After the 2024 Enga landslide, he flew to the site in a helicopter and took some pictures of the damage. He then went to Yambali where he gave a check of 500,000 kina for buying supplies for 4,000 displaced survivors. Joseph met with Chinese Foreign Affairs Minister Wang Yi and Chinese Ambassador to PNG Zeng Fanhua. There, they discussed about supplies for the damage.

During the same month, he announced 'Operation Planti Balus'. The goal of this operation was to provide transportation supplies to rural areas of PNG. He also helped manage activities leading up to the 50th anniversary of PNG's Independence. The operation officially started from September 3 and ended on September 5.

On 9 April 2026, after a video circulated alleging that Joseph had interfered with army recruitment to favor people from his district of Nipa-Kutubu, he resigned from his position to allow for an independent probe into the allegations.

== Foreign relations ==
=== Australia ===
In April 2024, Joseph began the modernization of the fire services with some to comply with the standards of Queensland. During the 2024 Egna Landslides, Australia promised to give $2,300,000 AUD in necessary aid and supplies.

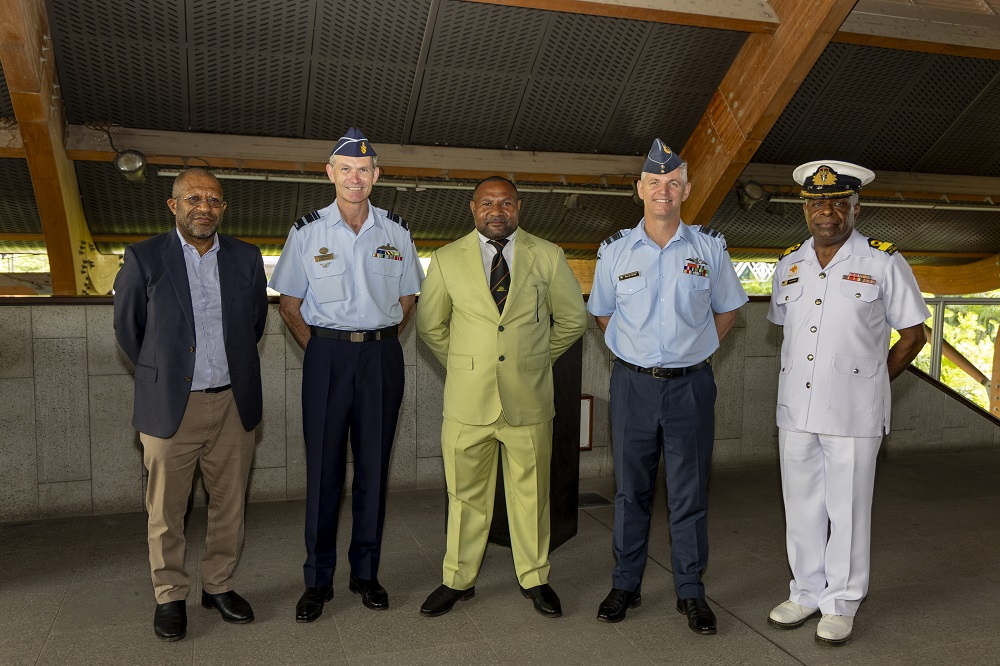
Billy Joseph (center) with Papua New Guinean, New Zealand, and Australian officials in April 2024.

On February 20, 2025, Joseph and Australian Minister for Defense Richard Marles began discussing a new defense treaty between the two nations due to pressure from Beijing. In June 2025, Joseph went to Canberra for the 2025 Defense Conference ‘Preparedness and Resilience’ meeting. He went on the Stop the World! Podcast, hosted by ASPI, with the Deputy Party Leader of the Social Democratic Party to discuss the Pukpuk Treaty. In July 2025, Australian war games were held. Part of the war games were held in PNG, with negotiations for a new military treaty between the two nations underway.

On September 13, 2025, Joseph and Marles made an agreement to integrate the Australian and PNG militaries, which was a blow to Chinese influence in the Pacific. This coincided with the 50th anniversary of PNG's independence. The treaty was officially signed on September 15. On September 19, China responded with a warning claiming that the treaty undermined PNG's own influence.

=== United States ===
In October 2025, Joseph went to The Pentagon and met with Deputy Prime Minister John Rosso, where they discussed opportunities for future engagements and deepening of the security partnership between the U.S and PNG.

=== Fiji ===
In April 2024, Joseph and Home Affairs Minister of Fiji Pio Tikoduadua discussed re-establishing the defense relationship between PNG and Fiji after Joseph made a visit to the Taskforce Command Headquarters in Nadi, Fiji. Joseph had also expressed his interests many times in maintaining strong ties between the two by participating in events like the United Nations and their peacekeeping operations.

=== Japan ===
On March 19, 2025, Joseph went to the 2nd Japan Pacific Islands Defense Dialogue and met Japanese Defense Minister Minoru Kihara with the goal of improving defense relations with Japan. In February 2026, he went to the 3rd Japan Pacific Islands Defense Dialogue and met with Shinjirō Koizumi, where they agreed on the Next-Generation Leadership Security Program.

=== Indonesia ===
In July 2025, Joseph visited Jakarta with Indonesian Defense Minister Sjafrie Sjamsoeddin to discuss stronger defense ties. They discussed further implementing the Defense Cooperation Agreement, which had been signed in 2010 and ratified by Indonesia in 2012. In December 2025, Joseph represented Papua New Guinea during a trilateral Defense Ministers’ Meeting in Port Moresby with Indonesia and Australia, where he stated that they will "deepen trust, harmonize and enhance coordination on issues".

=== Singapore ===
In June 2025, Joseph went to Singapore for the International Institute of Strategic Studies (IISS) Shangri-La Dialogue to discuss security trends. He held bilateral meetings from the sidelines of IISS with representatives of New Zealand, Singapore and Chile.
