= Unilineality =

Determination of descent groups through one sex of ancestor

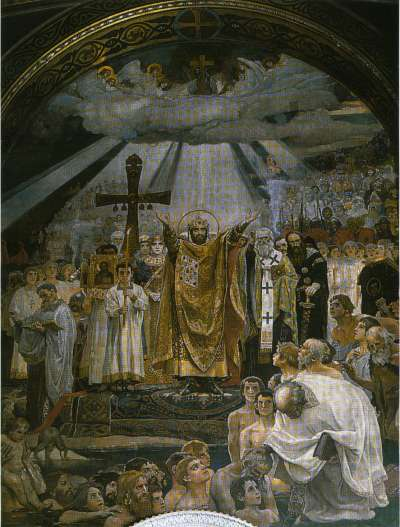
The Baptism of Kievans, a fresco by Viktor Vasnetsov.

Unilineality is a system of determining descent groups in which one belongs to one's father's or mother's line, whereby one's descent is traced either exclusively through male ancestors (patriline), or exclusively through female ancestors (matriline). Both patrilineality and matrilineality are types of unilineal descent. The main types of the unilineal descent groups are lineages and clans.

A lineage is a unilineal descent group that can demonstrate their common descent from a known apical ancestor. It is also called the simple unilineal descent.

== Unilineal descent organization and deep Christianization ==
Recent research on the unilineal descent organization has studied variables that are usually regarded as the main causes of the decline of unilineal descent organization – viz. statehood, class stratification and commercialization – along with one not previously considered: deep Christianization, defined here as having been Christianized over 500 years before ethnographic study. The research demonstrated that the traditionally accepted causes of the decline are less significant than deep Christianization, while the presence of unilineal descent groups correlates negatively with communal democracy and is especially strong for complex traditional societies. Its conclusion is that as the communal democracy correlates positively with the supracommunal one, Christianization might have contributed to the development of modern democracy by helping to replace unilineal descent organization in Europe.

== See also ==
- Ambilineality
- Family
- Cultural anthropology
