= Telefomin Incident =

- Location: Telefomin, Papua New Guinea
- Date: November 1953
- Deaths: 2 patrol officers 2 policemen

The Telefomin incident occurred in November 1953 in Papua New Guinea when two patrol officers and two policemen were killed.

Several locals were arrested, tried and sentenced to death.
