= Sam Basil Jr. =

Papua New Guinean politician

Member of the National Parliament of Papua New Guinea
- Incumbent
- Assumed office April 2022

Personal details
- Party: United Labour Party
- Parent: Sam Basil (father)

Sam Basil Jr. is a Papua New Guinean politician from the United Labour Party. He represents Bulolo Open in the National Parliament of Papua New Guinea.

He is the son of former deputy prime minister of Papua New Guinea Sam Basil.

== See also ==
- Members of the National Parliament of Papua New Guinea, 2022–2027
