= Solan Mirisim =

Papua New Guinean politician (1978–2025)

Minister of Department of Works and Highways
- In office August 24, 2022 – December 1, 2025
- Monarch: Charles III
- Prime Minister: James Marape
- Preceded by: Saki Soloma
- Succeeded by: Peter Tsiamalili Jnr.

Minister of the Papua New Guinea Defence Force
- In office December 2020 – June 2021
- Monarch: Elizabeth II
- Prime Minister: James Marape
- Preceded by: Saki Soloma
- Succeeded by: Win Bakri Daki
- In office 2017 – May 3, 2019
- Monarch: Elizabeth II
- Prime Minister: Peter O'Neill
- Preceded by: William Onglo
- Succeeded by: Saki Soloma

Personal details
- Born: October 9, 1978 Telefomin, West Sepik, Papua New Guinea
- Died: December 1, 2025 (aged 47) Port Moresby, Papua New Guinea
- Resting place: Telefomin
- Citizenship: Papua New Guinea
- Party: Pangu Pati
- Other political affiliations: People's National Congress
- Children: Several including Zollah
- Education: Lae Business College
- Occupation: Politician

Solan Mirisim (October 9, 1978 – December 1, 2025) was a Papua New Guinean politician and businessman who served as the Minister of the Papua New Guinea Defence Force from 2017 to 2019. And again from 2020 until his suspension in 2021. After his suspension, he served as the Minister of Department of Works and Highways from 2022 until his death.

== Early life and education ==
Solan was born on October 9, 1978 in Telefomin, West Sepik. He went to Telefomin Primary School and Telefomin High School before going to Lae and being educated at Lae Business College. He earned a certificate in Business Management.

== Political career ==
Solan began his political career when he was first affiliated with the People's National Congress Party (PNC) during the 2012 Papua New Guinean general election, where he received over 7,000 votes.

During the 2017 Papua New Guinean general election, he represented as a PNC candidate. He later switched to the Pangu Pati sometime before the 2022 Papua New Guinean general election, where he represented the Telefomin district.

Solan served as the Defence Minister for the Papua New Guinea Defence force from 2017 until he resigned on May 3, 2019. Prior to his resignation, rumors about him resigning in April 2019 were claimed to be debunked. Claiming social media stories were fake.

He later served again from December 2020 until June 2021 when he was suspended from his duties due to files revealing allegations of misconduct within office. He also was fined K500 for misinformation regarding his wife and children.

Following his suspension, he was appointed the Minister for Forestry until 2022 when he was appointed the Minister for Works and Highways by the Marape Government, and served from there.

=== Foreign relations ===
Solan has maintained foreign relations with multiple nations. In May 2018, he went on a courtesy call with Japanese ambassador Satoshi Nakajima, where they had discussed mutual interests and cooperation within engineering. In July 2018, he met the Chinese Defense Force Commander Gilbert Toropo and visited medical institutions. In October 2024, Chinese ambassador Yang Xiaoguang met with Solan and discussed promoting stronger synergy along with deeping and improving practical cooperation between China and Papua New Guinea.

== Personal life and death ==
Solan has reported to have a wife along with several children including a daughter named Zollah Mirisim, who is 22 years old.

Solan died in Port Moresby on December 1, 2025, after being rushed to the Port Moresby International Hospital, (Note: Other sources indicate that he died at Pacific International Hospital via St John Ambulance) where he was pronounced dead on arrival. He was 47. The cause of death was speculated to be an illness he had developed prior. Parliament Speaker Job Pomat announced his death during a parliament session the next day, and a coronial assessment for the death of Solan was issued by Prime Minister James Marape on December 3.

A funeral service was held at Siomi Kami Church in Port Moresby on December 15, where he was laid in the Grand Hall of the National Parliament. He went to Vanimo in his casket as a final visit. He was then flown to his birthplace Telefomin, where he was buried there. He was succeeded by Peter Tsiamalili Jnr.

== Reactions ==
Several tributes were paid at Solan's funeral. Some made social media posts regarding Solan's death.

=== Government official's reactions ===
- (Papua New Guinea) Prime Minister James Marape was informed twice before arriving at the hospital. (Note: He was first informed at 12:30am. And again at 1:30am in the morning) He visited his funeral and later delivered a speech. He later renamed a highway from Tabubil to Telefomin as the Mirisim Highway in memorial of him.
- (Papua New Guinea) The Governor of West Sepik Tony Wouwou gave his condolonces. Stating that he had “integrity, humility, and dedication to his people”.
- (Papua New Guinea) Deputy Prime Minister Belden Namah criticized people against Solan, and paid tributes.

=== International reactions ===
- (United States) The U.S Embassy in Papua New Guinea posted a social media post giving their condolences.
- (New Zealand) The RNZ marked Solan's death as one of the "unusual and destabilising periods" in the history of Papua New Guinea.
- (Australia) The Australian High Commissioner to Papua New Guinea Ewen McDonald made a social media post regarding the death and gave their condolences.
