= Afek (mythology) =

Mythic heroine of the Min peoples of Papua New Guinea

Afek is a mythic heroine in the religion of the Min peoples living in Sandaun Province of Papua New Guinea.

Humans were believed created in a multiple birth of the cultural heroine Afek, emerging immediately after the first dog. Afek gave the bush to the spirits right before birthing humans so that they would clear out the villages for the humans to dwell in.

Since as such dogs are spirits (and the "older brother" of man), Urapmin do not kill or eat them (unlike some neighboring tribes), nor do they let dogs breathe on their food. (This contrasts with humans—the Urapmin previously had no cannibalism taboo, but they can share food with them.) In fact, the taboo on eating dogs is one of the few still widely observed.

== See also ==
- Afekan, equivalent of Afek in Tifalmin mythology

== Bibliography ==
- Aletta, Biersack; James B. Greenberg (2006). Reimagining political ecology. Duke University Press. pp. 419. ISBN 0-8223-3672-3.
