= Robert Ganim =

Papua New Guinean politician

Robert Sandan Ganim (born 6 June 1962) is a Papua New Guinean politician. He was a member of the National Parliament of Papua New Guinea from 2012 to 2017, representing the electorate of Wabag Open for the People's Party (2012-2017) and the People's National Congress (2017).

Ganim was educated at Wabag, Telefomin and Nuku Primary Schools in West Sepik Province and Tusbab Secondary School in Madang Province, before graduating with a teaching diploma from Goroka Teachers College in 1984 and an education degree from the University of Papua New Guinea in 1993. He was head teacher at Kandep, Laiagam, Anditale and Kompiam high schools before becoming principal at Wabag Secondary School (later Sir Tei Abal Secondary School) for nine years. He also served as the manager of the Enga Mioks rugby league team. In February 2006, he was appointed as the top education adviser in Enga Province.

Ganim was elected to the National Parliament for the People's Party at the 2012 election, ousting former Deputy Prime Minister Sam Abal in one of the largest upsets of that election. In February 2017, he resigned from the People's Party in order to recontest the 2017 election for the governing People's National Congress. Ganim was chairman of the Parliamentary Referral Education Committee. He was defeated by Dr Lino Tom at the 2017 election.

National Parliament of Papua New Guinea
Preceded by Sam Abal	Member for Wabag Open; 2012–2017	Succeeded by Lino Tom
