= Lino Tom =

Papua New Guinean politician and medical doctor

Member of Parliament for Wabag District
- In office 2017–2024
- Preceded by: Robert Ganim

Personal details
- Born: 1975 (age 50–51) Wabag, Papua New Guinea
- Party: People's Party
- Occupation: Politician, Medical Doctor

Lino Tom (born 1975, in Wabag) is a Papua New Guinean politician and medical doctor.

Tom first entered Parliament for the Wabag District in the 2017 general elections, defeating the incumbent Robert Ganim to become the Member for Wabag District. He was re-elected to the position in 2022 and in August 2024, was appointed as the Minister of Health, later in September 2, he announced resignation from the government. Tom is a member of the People's Party.

He was a medical doctor before entering politics.
