= Elias Kapavore =

Papua New Guinean politician (born 1970)

Minister of the Papua New Guinea Defence Force
- Incumbent
- Assumed office 28 July 2026
- Prime Minister: James Marape
- Preceded by: Billy Joseph

Member of the National Parliament of Papua New Guinea
- Incumbent
- Assumed office May 2015

Personal details
- Born: 25 May 1970 (age 56) Paka Village, West Pomio/Mamusi, Papua New Guinea
- Education: Divine Word University

Elias Kapavore (born 25 May 1970) is a Papua New Guinean politician, who currently serves as the Minister of the Papua New Guinea Defence Force since July 2026. He has been a member of the National Parliament of Papua New Guinea since May 2015, representing the electorate of Pomio Open in East New Britain Province.

== Early life and professional career ==
Kapavore, from Paka village in the West Pomio/Mamusi area, was educated at Pokapun Primary School, Palmalud High School and Divine Word University, receiving a management degree and a double masters in public and business administration. He was the chief executive officer of the Vanimo Hospital and the West Sepik Provincial Health Authority prior to entering politics.

== Political career ==
Nominating as an independent, Kapavore won a May 2015 by-election for the Pomio Open seat following the conviction and imprisonment of the seat's former MP, Paul Tiensten. He joined the governing People's National Congress upon his election, and declared his priority as being to "deliver roads and bridges which will connect Pomio to Kokopo". In November 2015, he raised concerns about environmental damage caused by Niugini Gold Limited's Sinivit Mine.

=== Defence minister (2026-present) ===
In July 2026, Kapavore was appointed as Minister of the Papua New Guinea Defence Force. As minister, he signed a statement of intent with New Zealand Defence Minister Chris Penk to boost bilateral defence cooperation between the two countries. Key provisions included Papua New Guinea seeking support from the Pacific Islands Forum in times of crises, expanding joint maritime cooperation, defence dialogue, training exercises, and military exchanges.

National Parliament of Papua New Guinea
Preceded by Paul Tiensten	Member for Pomio Open; 2015–present	Incumbent
