= Saki Soloma =

Papua New Guinean politician

Minister for Energy
- In office January 21, 2021 – 23 August 2022
- Prime Minister: James Marape
- Preceded by: William Onglo
- Succeeded by: Kerenga Kua

Minister for Correctional Services
- In office 16 November 2020 – 19 December 2020
- Prime Minister: James Marape
- Preceded by: Chris Nangoi
- Succeeded by: Win Bakri Daki

Minister for the Papua New Guinea Defence Force
- In office June 2019 – December 2020
- Prime Minister: James Marape
- Preceded by: Solan Mirisim
- Succeeded by: Solan Mirisim

Personal details
- Born: Saki Hacky Soloma
- Citizenship: Papua New Guinea
- Education: University of Goroka; (Bachelor's degree)

Saki Hacky Soloma is a Papua New Guinean politician who serves as the Minister of Energy for Papua New Guinea from December 2020 to August 2022. He previously served as the Minister for Correctional Services from 16 November 2020 until 19 December 2020 and as the Minister for the Papua New Guinea Defence Force from June 2019 to December 2020.

== Education ==
Saki went to Okapa High School in 1995 before going to Aiyura National High School in 1997. He completed University of Goroka with a Bachelor's degree in 2003.

== Political career ==
Saki was first elected in the 2017 Papua New Guinean general election representing the Okapa District under the Pangu Pati. He was re-elected in the 2022 Papua New Guinean general election representing the same district.

In June 2019, he was elected as Minister of Defence for the Papua New Guinea Defence Force by the Marape government. He was succeeded by Solan Mirisim. And in November 2020, he was appointed as Minister for Correctional Services. He served until December 2020 when he was appointed as the Minister of Energy. He began serving in January 2021, and served until August 2022. In October he was appointed as Chairman of the Constitutional and Law Reform Commission.

== Foreign relations ==
=== Australia ===
In 2019, he went to Australia and met with Nicky Hamer. There, they discussed about stronger relations between Papua New Guinea and Australia as well as stronger cooperation between the two. This was a part of a bigger meeting hosted by both Australian Prime Minister Scott Morrison and PNG Prime Minister James Marape. In the same month, he spoke with senator Linda Reynolds in focusing with better defence cooperation between the two countries.

=== United States ===
In 2020, he and Mark Esper discussed about their defence against the Indo-Pacific region. This also concluded a U.S. – PNG Defense Cooperation Agreement they had made prior.

=== Riot ===
In June 2022, he was attacked by supporters at Okapa station after gathering a rally there. He was eventually rescued by police. The cause was from the outcome of the 2022 Papua New Guinean general election, with many being disappointed with the results.
