= Jimmy Uguro =

Papua New Guinean politician (died 2024)

The Honourable Jimmy Uguro
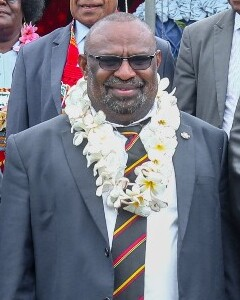
- Jimmy Uguro in 2023

Minister of Education of Papua New Guinea
- In office 20 December 2020 – 6 February 2024
- Monarchs: Elizabeth II; Charles III
- Governor General: Bob Dadae
- Prime Minister: James Marape
- Preceded by: Joseph Yopyyopy
- Succeeded by: Vincent Kumura

Personal details
- Died: 6 February 2024 Wewak, Papua New Guinea
- Party: National Alliance Party; Pangu Pati

Jimmy Uguro (died 6 February 2024) was a Papua New Guinean politician. He served as Minister of Education from 2020 until his death in 2024.

== Biography ==
=== Political career ===
In 1995, Uguro obtained a primary school teaching diploma after training at the Madang School Teachers Training College. In 2001, he obtained a teaching degree at the University of Goroka, followed by a master's degree in this field at Divine Word University in Madang in 2005. He worked in the public administration of the Madang Province before entering politics.

Uguro entered the National Parliament as a deputy for the Usino-Bundi constituency in the 2017 elections, as a member of the National Alliance Party. He served as Deputy Minister of Mines from June 2019 to December 2020, after which he became a member of Pangu Pati. In December 2020, he was promoted to Minister of Education. He was reappointed to this position after the 2022 elections.

=== Death ===
Uguro died in Wewak on 6 February 2024.

== See also ==
- List of members of the Papua New Guinean Parliament who died in office
