= Vincent Kumura =

Papua New Guinean politician

Member of the National Parliament of Papua New Guinea for Usino-Bundi Open
- Incumbent
- Assumed office August 2025
- Preceded by: Jimmy Uguro

Personal details
- Party: Independent

Vincent P. Ambane Kumura is a Papua New Guinean politician. He was elected to the National Parliament of Papua New Guinea in a 2025 by-election to replace his predecessor, Jimmy Uguro, who died in office. The election was very competitive, with 27 candidates and 5 former MPs running, and with Kumura's victory being by a small margin of just 279 votes.

== Biography ==
Kumura studied law at the University of Papua New Guinea but had struggles. He directly wrote to Sir Michael Somare, Papua New Guinea's founding prime minister, asking for financial support to study in the United States. He received this support. After leaving Papua New Guinea for an education in California, U.S., Kumura abandoned a successful finance and business career to return to PNG in 2010. He founded the Kumura Foundation to develop rural areas and provide healthcare and education opportunities. He draws on his personal story in his work with his foundation and in Parliament: “That support [from PM Somare] changed my life, and today I want to give other students the same opportunity.”
