= William Bando =

Papua New Guinean politician

Minister of Coffee for Papua New Guinea
- Incumbent
- Assumed office January 18, 2024
- Prime Minister: James Marape
- Preceded by: Joe Kuli

Chairman of Law and Order
- In office September 2, 2022 – January 18, 2024

Personal details
- Party: United Resources Party

William Bando is a Papua New Guinean politician who currently serves as the second Minister of Coffee for Papua New Guinea since January 2024. He previously served as the Administrator of Hela province sometime in 2018.

== Education ==
He studied at the University of Papua New Guinea, where he got a certificate for Practicing Accountant. He also received a LM Logohu Medal.

== Career ==
Bando was first elected in the 2022 Papua New Guinean general elections representing and gaining a seat for the Koroba-Lake Kopiago district as a United Resources Party candidate. He was appointed as the Chairman of Law and Order in September 2022, and served until January 2024.

Following a cabinet reshuffle in 2024, he was appointed as the second Minister of Coffee for Papua New Guinea, succeeding Joe Kuli.
