= Peter Tsiamalili Jnr. =

Papua New Guinean politician

Minister of Works and Highways
- Incumbent
- Assumed office January 15, 2026
- Prime Minister: James Marape
- Preceded by: Solan Mirisim

Minister of Police and Internal Security
- In office February 2021 – January 15, 2026
- Prime Minister: James Marape
- Succeeded by: John Pundari

Personal details
- Citizenship: Papua New Guinea

Peter Tsiamalili Jnr. is a Papua New Guinean businessman and politician who currently serves as the Minister of Works and Highways since January 2026 after being acting minister in July 2025. A former governor elect for Bougainville, he previously was the Minister for Police and Internal Security alongside a member of the Regional Seat of Bougainville. He served from February 2021 to January 2026.

== Political career ==
Peter was first elected in the 10th Parliament of Papua New Guinea after an election. In February 2021, he was elected as the Minister of Police and Internal Security. In May 2021, he was elected as the Vice Minister on Bougainville Matters, where he assisted the Prime Minister. Following the death of Solan Mirisim, a cabinet reshuffle elected him as the Minister of Works and Highways in January 2026. A ceremony was held later in the month. He was succeeded by John Pundari.

=== Foreign relations ===
Peter attended the 31st Australia-Papua New Guinea Ministerial Forum Communiqué.
