= Bilateral descent =

Family lineage system

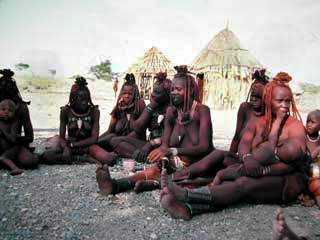
The Himba of Namibia live under a tribal structure based on bilateral descent.

Bilateral descent is a system of family lineage in which the relatives on the mother's side and father's side are equally important for emotional ties or for transfer of property or wealth. It is a family arrangement where descent and inheritance are passed equally through both parents. Families who use this system trace descent through both parents simultaneously and recognize multiple ancestors, but unlike with cognatic descent it is not used to form descent groups.

While bilateral descent is increasingly the norm in Western culture, traditionally it is only found among relatively few groups in West Africa, India, Australia, Indonesia, Melanesia, Malaysia, the Philippines, and Polynesia. Anthropologists believe that a tribal structure based on bilateral descent helps members live in extreme environments because it allows individuals to rely on two sets of families dispersed over a wide area. Historically, North Germanic peoples in Scandinavia in the Late Iron Age and Early Middle Ages had a bilateral society, where the descent of both parents were important. Genealogies featuring the legendary danish king Sigurd Snake-in-the-Eye gives him the matronymic name Áslaugsson due to his mother Aslaug's connection to Völsungs.

Under bilateral descent, every tribe member belongs to two clans, one through the father (a patriclan) and another through the mother (a matriclan). For example, among the Himba, clans are led by the eldest male in the clan. Sons live with their father's clan and when daughters marry they go to live with the clan of their husband. However inheritance of wealth does not follow the patriclan but is determined by the matriclan i.e. a son does not inherit his father's cattle but his maternal uncle's instead.

Javanese people, the largest ethnic group in Indonesia, also adopts a bilateral kinship system. Nonetheless, it has some tendency toward patrilineality.

The Dimasa tribe of Northeast India have a system of dual family clan. The Urapmin people, a small tribe in Papua New Guinea, have a system of kinship classes known as tanum miit. The classes are inherited bilaterally from both parents. Since they also practice strict endogamy, most Urapmin belong to all of the major classes, creating great fluidity and doing little to differentiate individuals.

== See also ==
- List of sociology topics
- Sociology
