= Win Bakri Daki =

Papua New Guinean politician

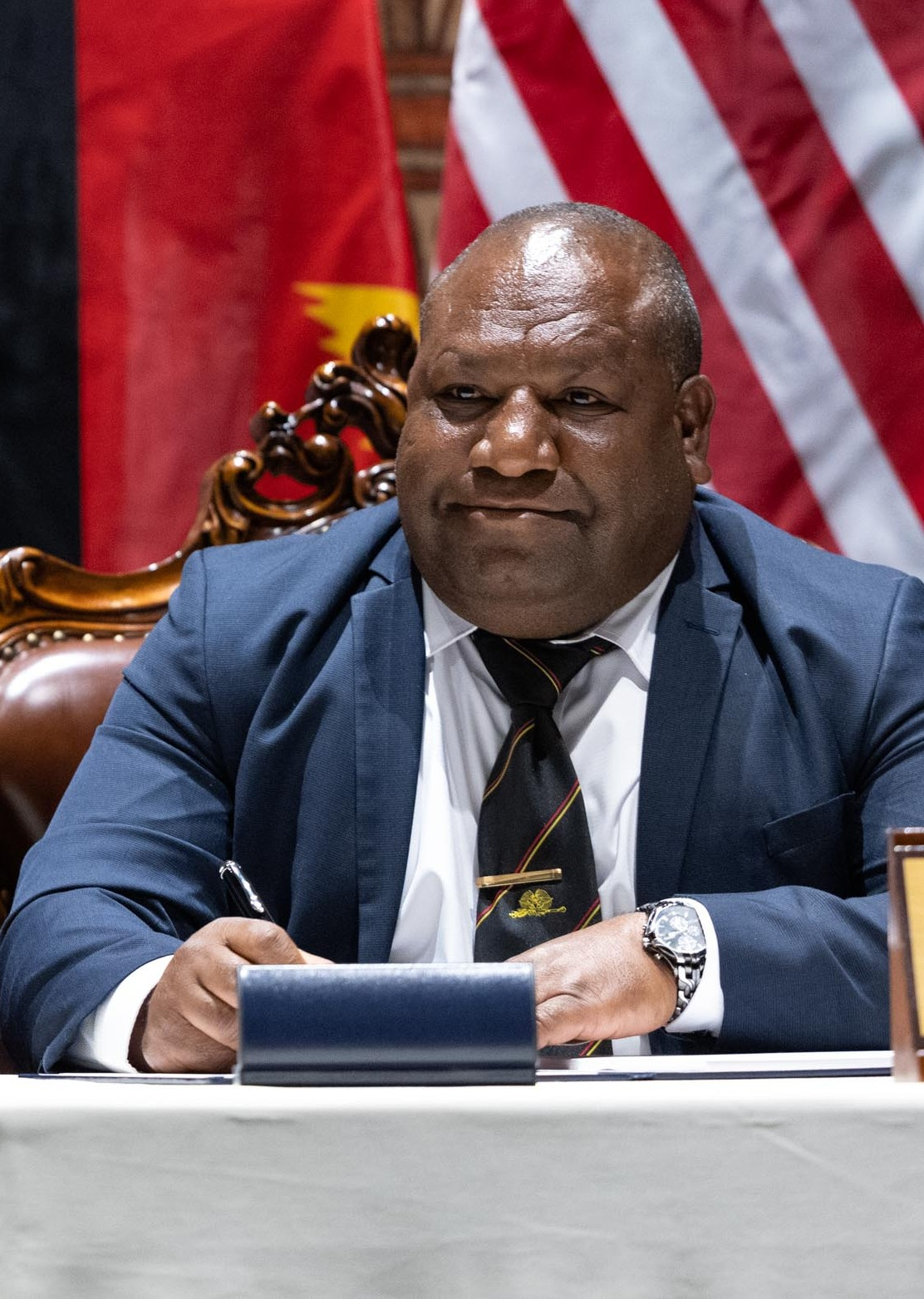
- Daki in 2023

Minister of the Papua New Guinea Defence Force
- In office January 10, 2022 – January 19, 2024
- Monarch: Charles III
- Prime Minister: James Marape
- Preceded by: Solan Mirisim
- Succeeded by: Billy Joseph

Correctional Service Minister
- In office January 2021 – January 2022
- Preceded by: Saki Soloma
- Succeeded by: Joe Kuli

Personal details
- Citizenship: Papua New Guinea
- Party: Pangu Pati
- Other political affiliations: People's National Congress
- Education: Tambul High School
- Occupation: Politician

Win Bakri Daki is a Papua New Guinean politician who served as Minister for Defense of Papua New Guinea from January 2022 until January 2024. Previously, he was Vice Minister for the Department of Treasury until his end of term in 2020. He served as Correctional Service Minister from January 2021 until January 2022, when he was elected to be Minister for Defense. After a cabinet reshuffle in 2024, he was appointed Minister for Commerce and Industry, where he currently serves. He is currently affiliated with the political party Pangu Pati.

== Education ==
Daki first went to Kamage Community School and then went to Tambul High School.

== Political career ==
Daki first ran at the 2017 Papua New Guinean general elections as an independent candidate representing the Tambul-Nebilyer District. He later joined the People's National Congress Party.

Daki was re-elected to the 11th National Parliament in the 2022 Papua New Guinean general election as a candidate under the Pangu Pati. He also represented the Tambul-Nebilyer District again, and received 41,000 votes.

Daki became the Minister of Defense following changes in the Papua New Guinean parliament by Prime Minister James Marape. He succeeded Solan Mirisim as Minister of Defense. During his time, he made several policies such as reducing reliance on imported goods and wanting to make jobs sustainable.

=== Foreign relations ===
Daki has strengthened relations with other countries, including the United States. In 2023, he, along with former Secretary of State Antony Blinken, signed a security pact to improve Papua New Guinea's military capabilities. This granted the U.S six military bases in Papua New Guinea. In 2023, he went and discussed with officials in Geelong, Victoria.

== See also ==
- Billy Joseph
- United States - Papua New Guinea relations
- Government of Papua New Guinea
- James Marape
