= Cognatic kinship =

Mode of descent

Cognatic kinship is a mode of descent calculated from an ancestor counted through any combination of male and female links, or a system of bilateral kinship where relations are traced through both a father and mother. Such relatives may be known as cognates.

== See also ==
- Matrilineality — Kinship through the female line
- Patrilineality — Kinship through the male line
