= Coffee production in Papua New Guinea =

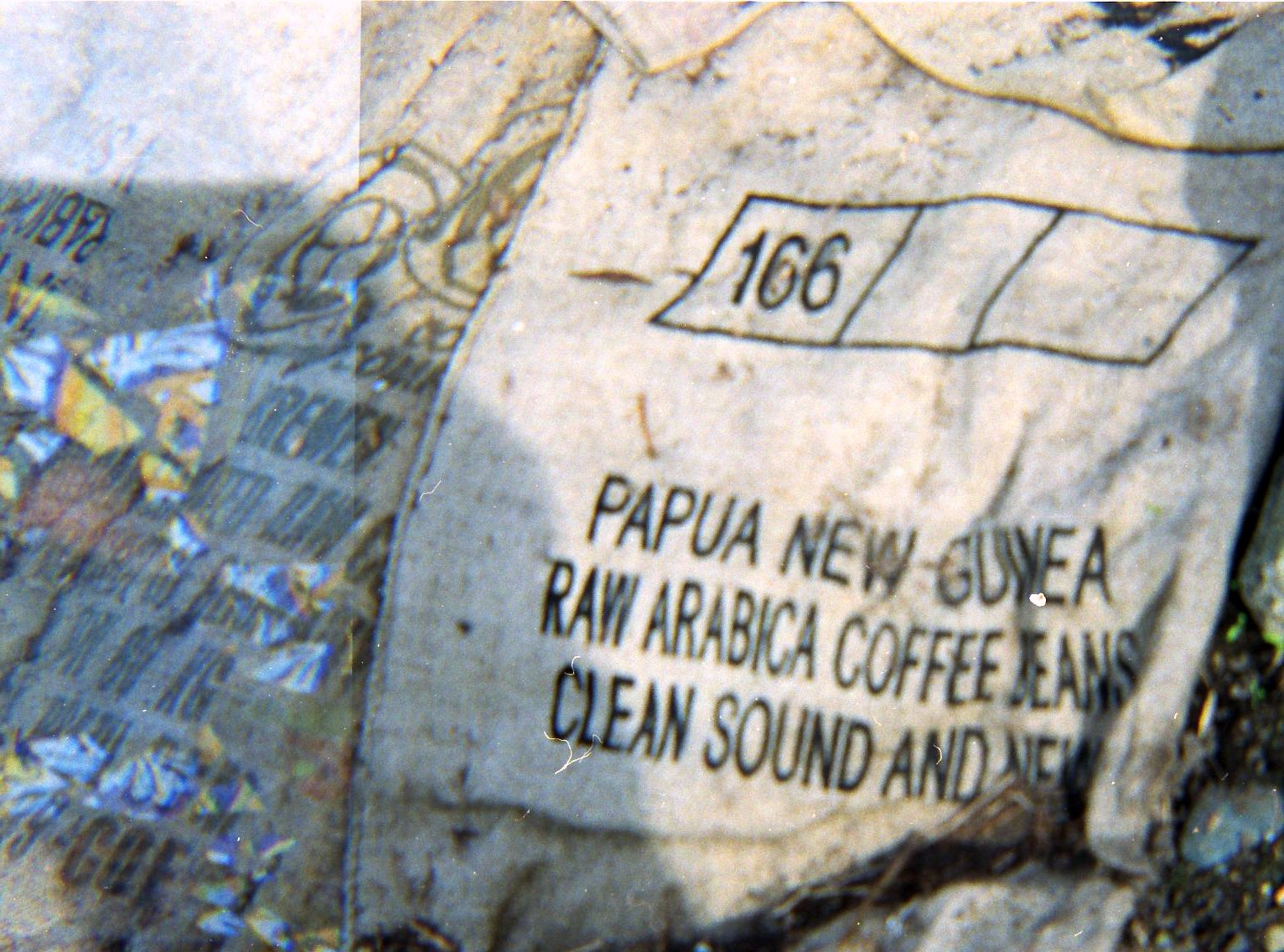
Papua New Guinea raw arabica coffee beans

Coffee production in Papua New Guinea is the country's second largest agricultural export, after oil palm, and employs approximately 2.5 million people. It accounts for approximately 1% of world production, according to the United Nations Conference on Trade and Development (UNCTAD).

Coffee is the highest foreign exchange earner for Papua New Guinea, the majority of which is grown in the Eastern Highland Province, the Western Highland Province, and Simbu. With the industry not derived on a colonial plantation-based system, production is largely by small farmers with land holdings that grow as little as 20 trees per plot in "coffee gardens" alongside subsistence crops. Predominantly in isolated places, the product is mostly certified as "organic coffee".

== History ==
Coffee production in PNG dates back to 1926–1927 when the first Jamaican Blue Mountain Coffee seeds were planted. The Coffee Research Institute claims that coffee was introduced to British Papua in 1890, although it is widely accepted that commercial production only took off in the country in the late 1920s. In Sangara, Papua New Guinea in the foothills in the southeast of the country, 18 commercial coffee plantations were established in 1926, paving the way for commercial production from 1928.

In the 1960s, the infrastructure developed significantly in Papua New Guinea which facilitated a marked growth in the industry, easing the transportation of coffee beans from plantations to the mills to be processed and exported. The coffee industry in Papua New Guinea thrived in the 1970s, benefiting from a slump in production in Brazil on the international market because of problems with frosts. In the 1980s, coffee plantation production declined in Papua New Guinea and decentralized towards localised small coffee farmers who are now accountable for over 85% of total national production. The coffee boom in the 1980s profoundly affected many coffee plantation owners who incurred debts they could not pay off, with the result that many were made redundant. From 1986, a number of cases of coffee rust, caused by Hemileia vastatrix, also affected some parts of Papua New Guinea which had previously been free of the disease.

The coffee industry in Papua New Guinea reached a peak in 1998 when it accounted for about 38% of PNG's non-mineral exports and 13% of total exports. Between 1995 and 1998, coffee production contributed to 42% of the revenue of PNG's total agricultural exports. Since then the industry has rapidly declined, affected by a world depression in coffee prices with prices falling up to 60%. As a result, production slumped by 23% in 2000 and remained stagnant in 2001.

A contemporary problem facing the industry is poor infrastructure and frequent hijacking by bandits which is major issue in Papua New Guinea, with some of the larger coffee producers losing some 50% of their total produce through theft annually. This is an issue of law and order that is creating loss of revenue to the producers through unchecked theft, which is attributed to the inadequate opportunities for the youth of the country to get suitable avenues for education and, more importantly, getting jobs after schooling.

Increased annual production by other competing countries in the world market is also affecting the contemporary industry in Papua New Guinea. In 2009, coffee was reported to be responsible for 18.5% of PNG's agricultural exports and 4.7% of total export revenue, a dramatic fall since the 1990s. In recent years, coordination between the private and public sectors have increased as has a movement towards a greater sustainability, with improved soil nutrition management and retention and education of farmers in prolonging the agricultural productivity of their land.

== Production ==
An estimated 87,000 hectares (210,000 acres) is under coffee cultivation in Papua New Guinea. The majority of the coffee is grown in the highlands, where 70% of the population are dependent upon subsistence agriculture.

In Papua New Guinea there are approximately 2.5 million people employed in the industry, with 280,000 smallholder coffee growers, 660 larger farmers cultivating areas of 1–30 hectares (2.5–74.1 acres), 65 large plantations, 18 registered exporters, 51 registered processors and over 6,000 roadside buyers. However, although 12 provinces are active in the coffee industry, the bulk of coffee (approximately 90%) is produced in the five highlands provinces, Western Highlands (45%), Eastern Highlands (37%), Simbu (6%), Morobe (5%) and East Sepik (5%).

In the late 1990s, PNG produced an average of 1.18 million bags annually, of which all were exported. Washed mild arabica highland coffee dominates the industry in Papua New Guinea (PNG), accounting for 95% of production, the other 5% being lowland washed robusta. The robusta coffee is of poorer quality, being darker, more bitter, with less flavour that the Arabic variety is generally used for cheaper instant coffee.

The higher quality arabica coffee is generally sold for making espresso, cappuccino and latte in the European markets of Switzerland, Germany, France and Italy and for American coffee companies such as Starbucks. The vast majority of the coffee sold to North America is grown in the West and East Highlands on estates; mainly Sigri and Arona coffee respectively. The highest quality widely distributed PNG coffee is from the Colbran estate on the Eastern Highlands.

=== Types of coffee ===
'PNG' the marketing label given to the popular brand of New Guinea Coffee is produced in the eastern half of the island state. There are two varieties, though, of this coffee, the one produced by large estates by the wet process (mostly sold in markets in USA) and the other produced by small farmers in their backyards, also by the wet process. The large estate coffees are also of many brands namely the Sigri and Arona, apart from Papua New Guinea, which are all high-grown coffee (wet-processed coffee) with fragrance and "low-key luxuriousness" akin to the type grown in Maritime Southeast Asia. The coffee grown by the small farmers, which is organically grown, on occasions, do not match with the quality of the estate grown coffee. One of the well established varieties of this type of coffee is the "Village Premium Morobe" produced in the Morobe Province of east-central part of the country.

== Problems ==
One of the main problems faced by coffee farmers in Papua New Guinea is the poor quality of basic infrastructure such as rural roads. This often leads to coffee remaining unsold on farms, which cannot be consumed and results in consequent loss of revenue or in distress sale of produce to even maintain subsistence level of living. Other problem areas highlighted are the changing of the cropping pattern from coffee to more economical crops or food crops, limited family land holdings restraining further growth, labour shortages creating difficulties during the main crop picking season and the unavoidable movement of the youth from villages to the urban areas in search of better job opportunities. Another significant problem faced by producers is the decline of coffee prices in the world market. Such a situation, when persists for long period, would call for subsidies to be provided by the government to small land holders so they can survive till prices improve.

=== Threats to the industry ===
The threat perspectives to coffee industry in PNG, including the aging trees (said to be in the age range of 27–47 years) without signs of timely replacements, large debts in the industry to the Rural Development Bank, and pests and diseases causing diseases such as Coffee Berry Disease (CBD), the spread of Berry Borer and Pink Disease necessitating prevention of its spread from Java to PNG.

=== Quality control ===
The quality of coffee grown in PNG is exceedingly high, often cupping in the specialty coffee range but due to several factors the quality is often compromised. Poor management and poor processes affect the quality of the produce. Locals are ill-equipped to process large volumes of coffee, adequately deal with disease and provide the proper care needed for delicate arabica coffee.

== Product ==
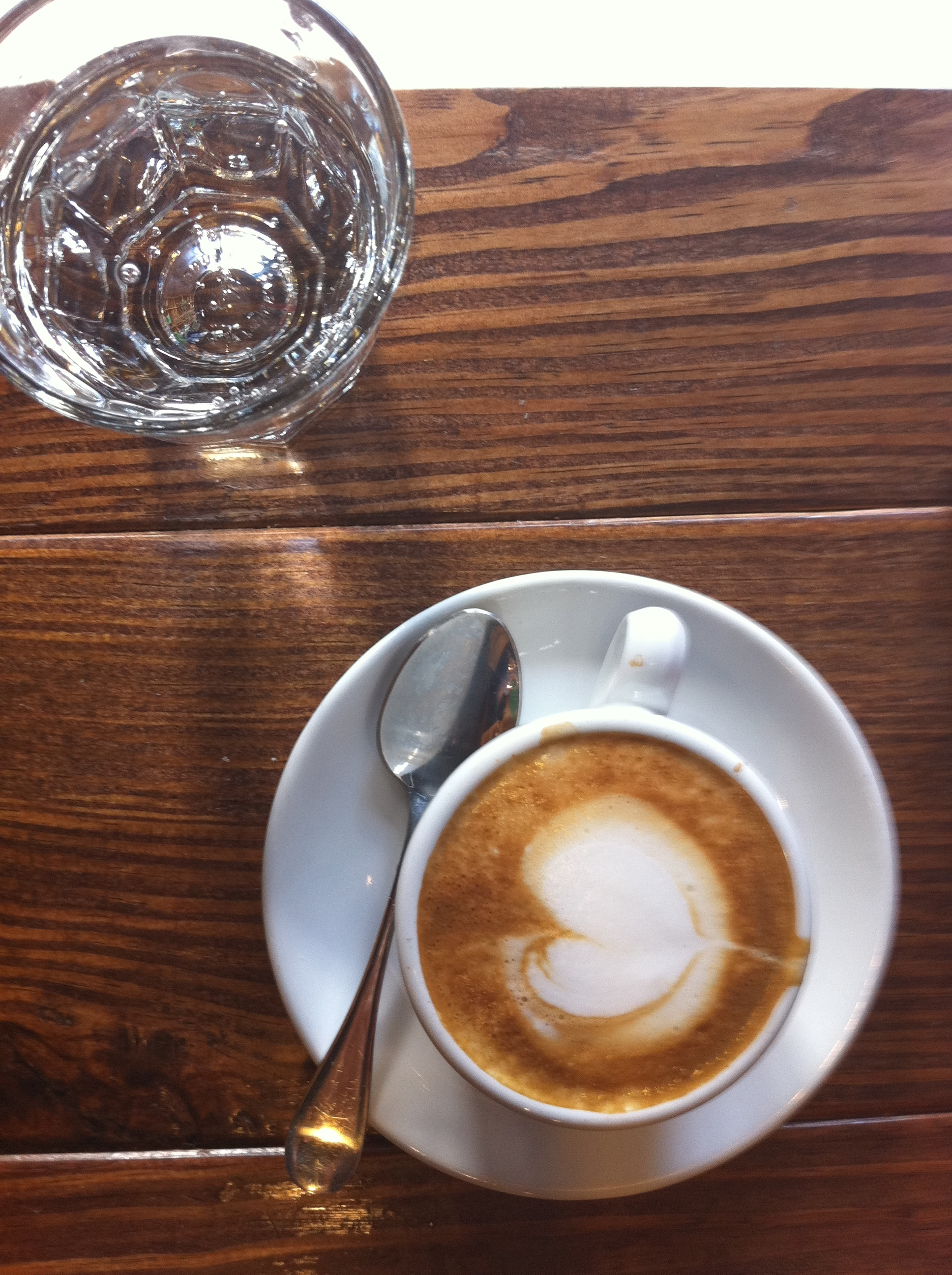

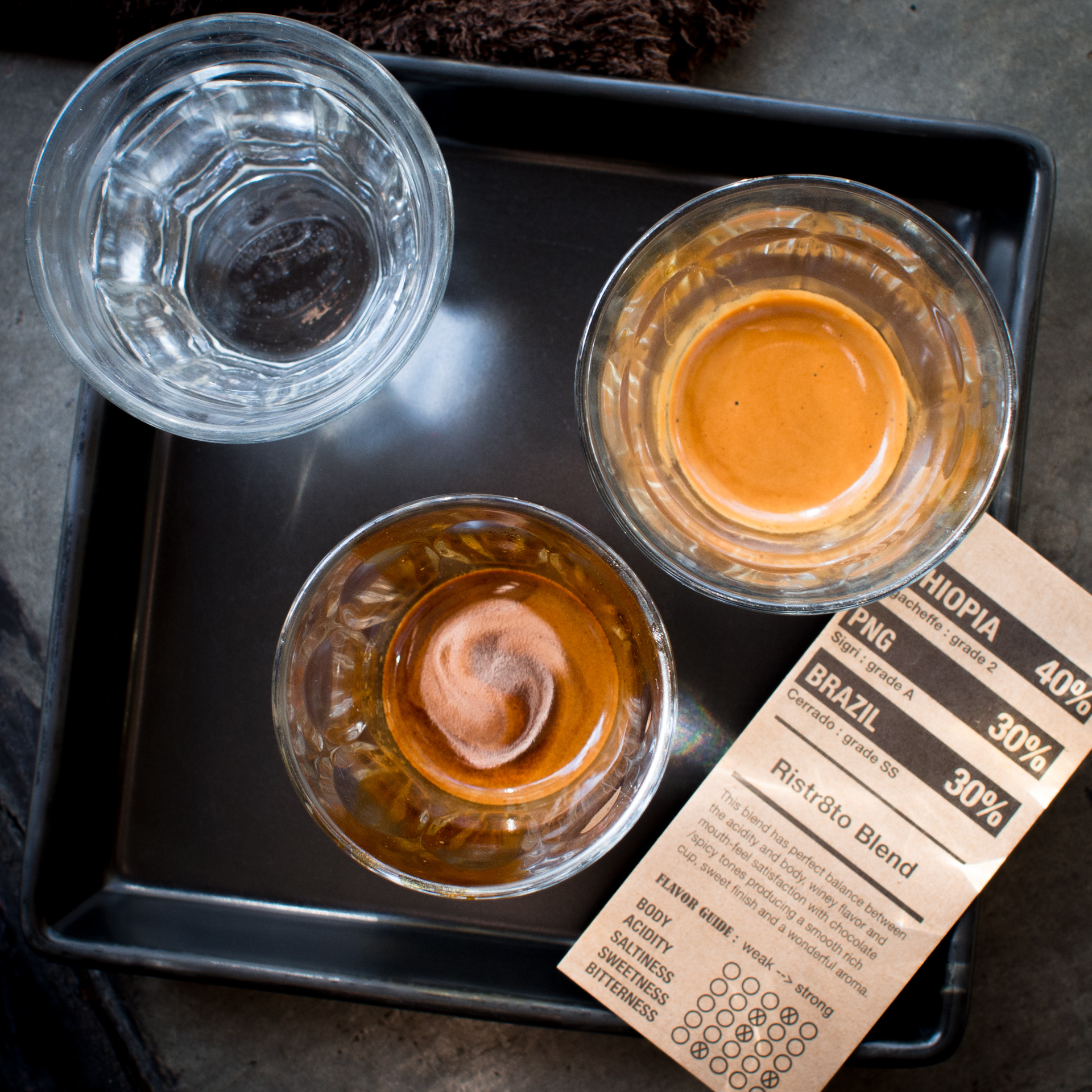
A "doppio ristretto" in Chiang Mai, Thailand, that, amongst others, contains coffee beans from Sigri, New Guinea

The coffee is naturally produced given that synthetic fertilisers and pesticides are too expensive and unobtainable which results in coffee with naturally low levels of caffeine and acidity. Papua New Guinean coffee is said to have medium body, low to medium acidity, a syrupy mouthfeel and often fruity notes.

The Coffee Industry Corporation Ltd., as an umbrella organisation, has regulated, facilitated, and also provided research and extension services to the coffee farming community. This has been enabled in the form of incentives to farmers to sustain production with due care for quality and marketing facilities.

=== Incentive schemes ===
Several incentive schemes have been introduced to help farmers, such as, providing subsidized plants from central nurseries, 'Coffee Credit Scheme' (from which 11,285 farming communities have benefited till March 2001), 'Freight Subsidy Scheme' in the form of subsidising 40% of airfreight, modifying minimum standards of parchment and green bean, establishing standards for cherry, parchment and green coffee and also facilitating establishment of a green bean standard known as the 'Premium Smallholder Coffee' (or PSC), an adaptation for the Gourmet coffee Market (Speciality Coffee Markets) in coffee consuming nations. Speciality Coffee or Gourmet coffee produced in Papua New Guinea has attracted clients from Japan following a publicity seminar. The speciality of this type of coffee produced in Papua New Guinea is that they are produced in their natural habitat without use of fertilizers, pesticides or weedicides or any other artificially manufactured supplements.

== Research ==
The coffee industry in PNG is supported by research conducted by the Coffee Research Institute (CRI), established in 1986 at Aiyura in Eastern Highlands Province. It is a division of the PNG Coffee Industry Corporation. In 2003, CRI and Extension Services Division of CIC were merged to create Research & Growers Services Division. The emphasis in research and extension support in coffee production in PNG is to ensure sustained production of coffee by smallholders, blocks and plantations to meet international standards of not only quality but also achieve economy of production. In this effort, the role of the corporation has been proactive to the farming community by way of establishing nurseries, generous issue of licenses, allotting land on tenure system, providing funding through international funding agencies from ACIAR and European Union (EU) and also providing selective subsidies.

== Quality ==
Quality of coffee produced in PNG has received a boost in recent times with emphasis on setting up wet factories supported by adequate checks and assurances of excellence through a testing process in well equipped laboratories. Consequently, the tasting panel instituted through appropriate training being imparted in Lae and Australia would assure better exposure to PNG coffee in the international market.

== See also ==
- Agriculture in Papua New Guinea
- List of countries by coffee production
- Coffee production in Australia
