= Telefol people =

Telefol, Telefomin, Kelefomin, Kelefoten
Total population
- 7,600; 4,000

Regions with significant populations

Languages
- Telefol language

Religion
- Protestant Christianity, Rebaibal

Related ethnic groups
- Falamin people, Tifalmin people, Miyanmin people, Iligimin people, Untoumin people, Urapmin people

The Telefol people are an ethnic group in the Sandaun Province of Papua New Guinea.

== History ==
Telefol history starts with the "Old Woman" (Afek) traveling through the land that is now the Eliptaman valley. She, as told through their creation stories, founded the Telefolip, the most sacred of Yolam Houses or Haus Tambaran in the Star Mountains Region about 300 years ago. Myth has it that there is a tunnel system between Mount Fubilan, the Yolam House at Bultem and the Telefolip exists, and that is how shell money and other valuable items came to the Telefol.

The Telefol defeated the Telefol-speaking Iligimin people after the Iligimin people razed the Telefolip in the 19th century. The Telefol then proceeded to settle their lands.

They then went on to defeat the Untou people, ritualistically cannibalizing the adults and absorbing the children into their group.

Once the Untoumin were annihilated, the Telefolmin and Miyanmin would sometimes raid each other until the later 1950s, when pacification occurred.

== Culture ==
The Telefol were part of a ritual system encompassing all of the Min peoples. They were acknowledged by the Min as being at the highest level of sacred knowledge, and groups such as the Baktaman were at the lowest level. The Telefolmins' level may have been matched by the Urapmin.

The Telefol possess a ubiquitous accessory called the bilum. Young children are introduced to the skills of bilum-making.

Magalim, a masalai or bush spirit of great significance to the Telefol is active at the fringes of Telefol consciousness. He is known by various names such as Aanang Kayaak, Tenum Misim, Bagan Kayaak. He is a "boss" of all things wild and of the forests. Magalim takes many forms: a snake, a dog, an overly generous European, a headless European, and a four glowing-eyed Ok Tedi worker who ran speedily over the landscape

=== Counting system ===
The Telefol language's base-27 counting system is mapped onto the body by counting each of the following: the left pinky to the left thumb (1–5); the wrist, lower arm, elbow, upper arm, and shoulder (6–10); the side of the neck, ear, and left eye (11–13); the nose (14); and the right eye to the right pinky (15–27; as for 1-14 but mirrored and in reverse order).

== See also ==
- Telefol language

== Bibliography ==
- Ingold, Tim (2000). The perception of the environment. Routledge. pp. 465. ISBN 978-0-415-22831-2.
- Manderson, Lenore; Margaret Jolly (1997). Sites of desire, economies of pleasure: sexualities in Asia and the Pacific. University of Chicago Press. p. 367. ISBN 978-0-226-50304-2.
- Robbins, Joel (2004). Becoming sinners: Christianity and moral torment in a Papua New Guinea society. University of California Press. pp. 383. ISBN 978-0-520-23800-8.
- Jorgensen, Dan. 1980. "What's in a Name? The Meaning of Meaninglessness in Telefolmin." Ethos 8(4):349 - 366.
- Jorgensen, Dan. 1981. "Life on the Fringe: History and Society in Telefolmin." in ed. Robert Gordon, Plight of Peripheral People in Papua New Guinea. Volume 1: The Inland Situation. Cambridge M.A: Cultural Survival Inc.: 59 - 79.
- Jorgensen, Dan. 1990. "The Telefolip and the Architecture of Ethnic Identity in the Sepik Headwaters." in eds. Barry Craig and David Hyndman, Children of Afek: Tradition and Change Among the Mountain-Ok of Central New Guinea. Sydney: Oceania Monographs. 151 - 160.
- Jorgensen, Dan. 2002. "The Invention of Culture, Magalim and the Holy Spirit." Social Analysis 46(1):69 - 79.
- Jorgensen, Dan. 2007. "Hinterland History: The Ok Tedi Mine and its Cultural Consequences in Telefolmin." The Contemporary Pacific 18(1):11-56.
