= People's Party (Papua New Guinea) =

- Leader: Peter Ipatas
- President: Douglas Ivarato
- Secretary: Willie Palme
- Founder: Peter Ipatas
- Founded: 2006
- National Parliament: 4 / 118

Website
- peoplespartypng.com

The People's Party is a political party in Papua New Guinea.

It was founded in 2006 by Peter Ipatas, governor of Enga Province, following his resignation from the Papua New Guinea Party. The party won three seats at the 2007 election: Ipatas, Sailon Beseo (Kainantu Open) and Samson Kuli (Usino-Bundi). The party then supported Michael Somare for Prime Minister. It gained an additional MP in August 2010, when newly elected Wewak Open MP Dr Moses Manwau joined the party. During the attempts to topple Somare's government in his absence in 2011, the party strongly supported his designated Acting Prime Minister, Sam Abal.

The People's Party won six seats at the 2012 election: Ipatas, John Pundari (Kompiam-Ambum Open), Robert Ganim (Wabag Open), Davis Steven (Esa'Ala Open), Mogerema Sigo Wei (Karimui-Nomane Open) and Westly Nukundi (Dei Open), while Kuli lost his seat. It switched its support to the government of Peter O'Neill after the election. The party "unequivocally supported" an extension of the "grace period" banning no-confidence votes from 18 months to 30 months.

In January 2013, the party announced a merger with the governing People's National Congress. However, later that month, the Registrar of the Integrity of Political Parties and Candidates Commission stated that the requirements of the Organic Law on the Integrity of Political Parties and Candidates had not yet been met, and that they were "still two different parties". The parties remain closely linked; however, while some sources have stated that they have merged, the Integrity of Political Parties and Candidates Commission still lists the two as separate parties, and it remains separately registered for the 2017 election.
