= Mountain Ok people =

Min peoples or Mountain Ok are a cultural group in the West Sepik Province of Papua New Guinea and Highlands Papua in Indonesia.

The Min peoples, though multiple distinct peoples, shared a ritual system. The Telefol were acknowledged by the Min as being at the highest level of sacred knowledge, and groups, such as the Baktaman, were at the lowest level. In this ranking, the Urapmin were either at the top, or at least, very close to the Telefol.

== Bibliography ==
- Barker, John (2007). The Anthropology of Morality in Melanesia and Beyond. Ashgate Publishing, Ltd. ISBN 978-0754671855.
- Moretti, Daniele (2007). "Ecocosmologies in the Making: New Mining Rituals in Two Papua New Guinea Societies". Ethnology. 46 (4).
- Robbins, Joel (2004). Becoming Sinners: Christianity and Moral Torment in a Papua New Guinea Society. University of California Press. pp. 383. ISBN 978-0-520-23800-8.
