= Telefomin =

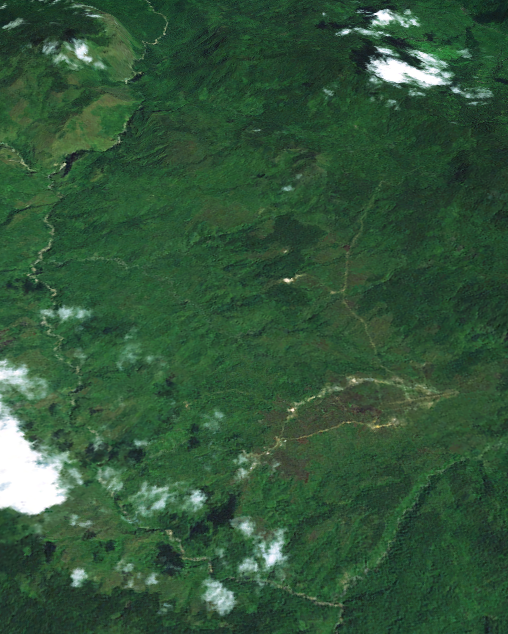
- An image of Telefomin from space. The Sepik river can be seen, only a short distance from its source.

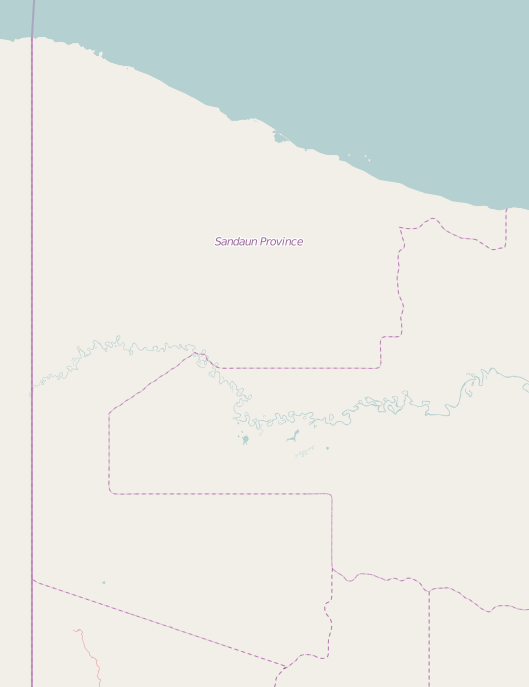
- Location within Sandaun Province
- Coordinates: 5°07′30″S 141°38′30″E
- Country: Papua New Guinea
- Province: Sandaun Province (West Sepik)
- Time zone: UTC+10 (AEST)
- Location: 47 km (29 mi) NE of Tabubil; 272 km (169 mi) S of Vanimo; 470 km (290 mi) NNW of Daru; 780 km (480 mi) NW of Port Moresby
- Climate: Af

Telefomin is a station town on the border of Sandaun and Western Provinces in Papua New Guinea. The town started during the Second World War after Mick Leahy was assigned to engineer an airstrip in 1944 for the United States for use against the Imperial Japanese Army forces based in New Guinea.

The Sepik River runs west–east south of the town. The Baptist Mission of Telefomin contains a notable museum and fossils that have been found in the area.

The Telefomin peoples traditionally have carved designs onto tall boards for the entrances of their houses.

In 1953 two Australian patrol officers and four police were killed by tribesman in the Telefomin Incident.

A road connecting Telefomin to Tabubil was opened on 12 September 2025.
