= Lagaip-Porgera District =

Lagaip-Porgera Lagaip-Pogera
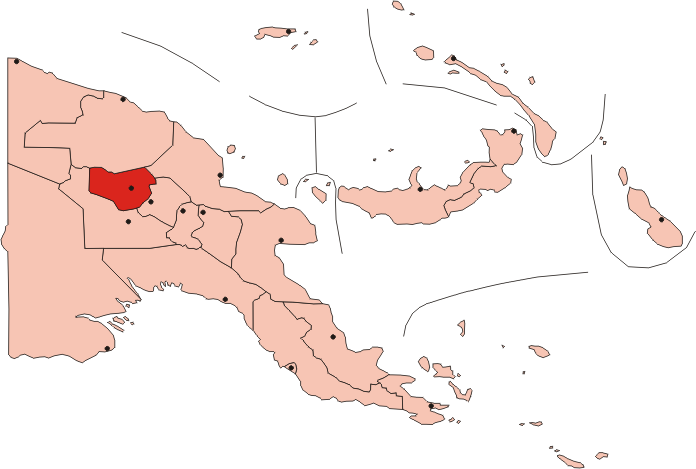
- Location of Enga Province

- Location within Papua New Guinea
- Coordinates: 5°27′48″S 143°08′42″E
- Country: Papua New Guinea
- Province: Enga Province
- Capital: Lagaip-Porgera

Area
  - Total: 4,608 km^{2} (1,779 sq mi)

Population (2011 census)
  - Total: 158,873
  - Density: 34.48/km^{2} (89.30/sq mi)
- Time zone: UTC+10 (AEST)

Lagaip-Porgera (also spelled local as Lagaip-Pogera) is a district of the Enga Province of Papua New Guinea. Its principal towns are Laiagam and Porgera.

== Administrative subdivisions ==
The district is divided into four Local Governments:

- Lagaip Rural
- Maip-Mulitaka Rural
- Paiela-Hewa Rural
- Porgera Rural

== Demographics ==
The population of the district was 158,873 at the 2011 census.

== Climate ==
The average tempiture is 44.6°F . The warmest month is December, at 50°F, and the coolest month is February, at 35.6°F. The average rainfall 124.96 inches per year.

Lagaip Porgera

Climate chart (precipitation, max. and min. temperature)
J	F	M	A	M	J	J	A	S	O	N	D
289 13 5	282 12 −7	283 12 −1	379 13 −2	235 13 1	225 11 5	196 12 5	190 14 2	321 14 2	263 14 3	236 14 2	274 15 5
- █ Average max. and min. temperatures in °C
- █ Precipitation totals in mm
Imperial conversion
J	F	M	A	M	J	J	A	S	O	N	D
11 55 41	11 54 19	11 54 30	15 55 28	9.3 55 34	8.9 52 41	7.7 54 41	7.5 57 36	13 57 36	10 57 37	9.3 57 36	11 59 41
- █ Average max. and min. temperatures in °F
- █ Precipitation totals in inches

== Gallery ==
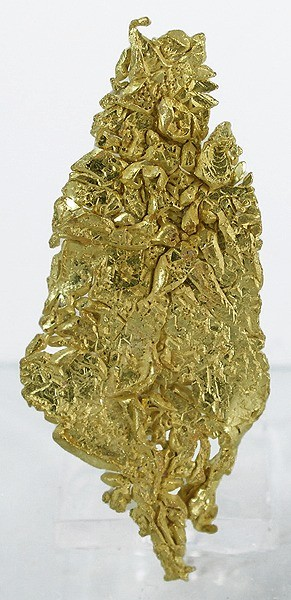
Gold specimen from Porgera Rural LLG collected in the 1980s.

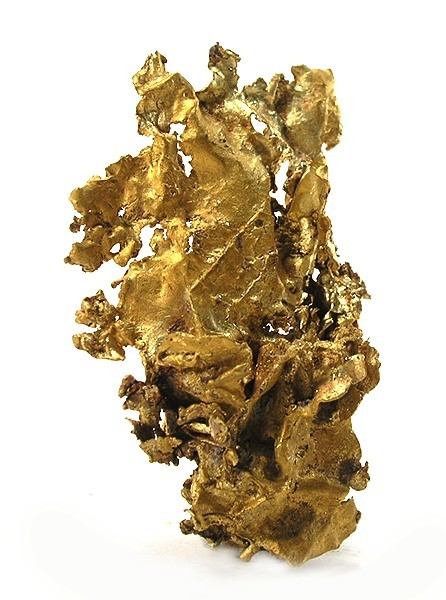
Gold specimen from the Pogera gold mine.
