= Yambali =

Yambali, Papua New Guinea
- Village
- Interactive map of Yambali, Papua New Guinea
- Coordinates: 5°23′7.38″S 143°23′18.75″E
- Country: Papua New Guinea
- Elevation: 2,230 m (7,320 ft)

Population
  - Total: 4,000

Yambali is a village in Maip Muritaka Rural LLG, Lagaip District of Enga Province, Papua New Guinea. It is located directly at the Laiagam-Porgera road. Yambali is 595 km (370 mi) northwest of the capital, Port Moresby. As of May 2024, Yambali had a population of nearly 4,000 people. The settlement was destroyed in the 2024 Enga landslide.
