= Kandep Rural LLG =

Local-level government in Papua New Guinea

- Location within Papua New Guinea
- Coordinates: 5.843457°S 143.509436°E
- Country: Papua New Guinea
- Province: Enga Province
- Time zone: UTC+10 (AEST)

Kandep Rural LLG is one of two LLGs of the Kandep District of Enga Province, Papua New Guinea. It is located in southern Wabag, the capital town of Enga Province. Kandep shares land borders with Laiagam - Porgera, Wabag, and Wapenimanda District, along with additional land borders between the Southern Highlands, the Western Highlands provinces, and the newly Provinces.

Wabag is accessible via a three-hour road trip along the Kandep - Laiagam Road. Access via Kandep - Mendi Road is currently unavailable due to construction efforts; however, the Kandep - Magarima Road remains connected.

Kandep LLG comprises council wards from Lai and Mariant. The Lai River which flows from north to south divides the District into two LLGs.

== Wards ==
- 01. Weri
- 02. Mumund
- 03. Iuripaka
- 04. Supi
- 05. Aluwaip
- 06. Gini
- 07. Komborosa
- 08. Imali (Pindata)
- 09. Pindaka
- 10. Pura
- 11. Kambia
- 12. Koropa
- 13. Lagalap No.1
- 14. Lakalap No.2
- 15. Winjap No.1
- 16. Winjap No.2
- 17. Lawe
- 18. Muyen
- 19. Warabim No.1
- 20. Warabim No.2
- 21. Teteres
- 22. Yapum
- 23. Murip
- 24. Lakis
- 25. Lyumbi Island
- 26. Porgeramanda
- 27. Kokas
- 28. Rugutengesa
- 29. Kandep Stn
- 30. Sawi
- 31. Werit 2
- 32. Ipul
- 33. Komatin (Megere)
- 34. Tinjipak (Supi No.2)
- 35. Wambokon (Gini No.2)
- 36. Kondo (Kombolos No.2)
- 37. Kamale (Imali 2)
- 38. Kalimang (Pindak 2)
- 39. Mamamdai Pura 2
- 40. Kambia 2
- 41. Lauk Kolopa 2
- 42. Tarapis
- 43. Kiap Akulia
- 44. Lawe 2
- 45. Kemau Tesres
- 46. Kiakau Murip 2
- 47. Keso
- 48. Wapis Kokas 2
- 49. Nangulam Lungutenges 2
- 50. Sawi No.2
- 51. Kola
- 52. Kolopen
- 53. Yangin
- 54. Wapis

    7 wards below need to create 

- 55. Konatsolsambal
- 56. Tipia Manda
- 57. Yuripak Two
- 58. Alowaip Two
