= Kandep =

District Headquarters

Coordinates: 05°50′32″S 143°30′38″E

Kandep is the district headquarters of Kandep District in the southern Enga Province of Papua New Guinea. It is a rural station located in the southern part of the district, and is administered by Kandep Rural LLG.

== Flights ==
The old Kandep District Airport is located in the heart of Kandep.

== Safety ==
Warring tribes and factions have made travel along the roads dangerous, with hold-ups becoming all too common.
