= Akali Tange Association =

Papua New Guinean community organization

Akali Tange Association Inc.
- Purpose: Community advocacy, human rights
- Headquarters: Porgera
- Executive Officer: McDiyan Robert Yapari
- Website: https://sites.google.com/site/akalitange/

Akali Tange Association Inc is a human rights focused landowner's association based in Porgera, Papua New Guinea that advocates for community interests where multinational mines operate.

== Organisation ==
Membership includes the relatives of more than twenty deceased "illegal miners" who have been killed near the Porgera Joint Venture.

In 2006, the organisation's Executive Officer was Jethro Tulin, and as of 2017, it was McDiyan Robert Yapari.

== History ==
In April 2005, Akali Tange published The Shooting Fields of Porgera Joint Venture documenting allegations of ongoing assaults and murders of local residents by the security contractors of Porgera Gold Mine. They shared the 163 page report with MiningWatch Canada. Catherine Coumans of MiningWatch Canada described the report as gruesome and credible. The report expanded the scope of concern of activists from only environmental to also human rights.

The report led to an admission from Placer Dome that their security guards and local police killed eight Papua New Guineans. This led to a 2006 public commission. However, the results were not made public.

In 2007, Akali Tange joined the Porgera Landowners Association to form the Porgera Alliance organization.
