= Mining in Papua New Guinea =

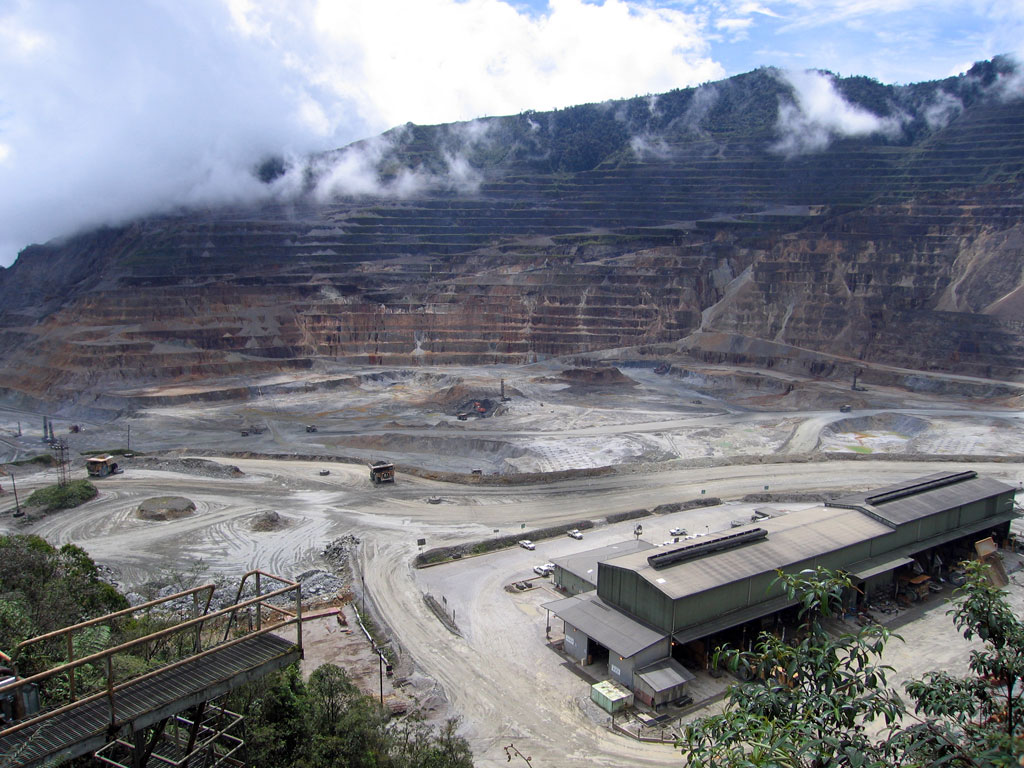
The Ok Tedi Mine

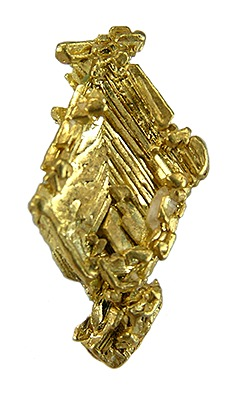
Crystalline gold from a mine in PNG

Mining in Papua New Guinea is an important part of the Papua New Guinean economy.

== History ==
In the late 1800's mining in PNG was focused on gold mining using limited if any mechanisation. Up until 1970, there was little large scale mineral extraction in Papua New Guinea. Since the 1970s, mineral extraction has dominated the national economy.

With the exception of the Oki Tedi Mine (copper-gold) and the Ramu nickel-cobalt mine, almost all of the mining in PNG had been gold mining. The two largest gold mines are the Porgera (Enga Province) and Lihir (New Ireland Province) mines. In 2009, the Hidden Valley gold and silver mine (Morobe Province) commenced production.

All the mining activity that has taken place in the country since 1970 has produced approximately 5 million tonnes of copper between 1970 and 2007. The country produced 202,277 t of copper in 2003 compared to 211,315 in 2002, all of which was produced by the Oki Tedi Mine the most active mine in the country. The mine reported that 29.32 Mt of ore was mined (approximately 240,000 t/d material moved) and 29.26 Mt milled (77,000 t/d) with a head grade of 0.78% Cu and 0.8 g/t Au. Respective gold and copper recoveries for 2003 at Ok Tedy were 68% and 84%.

== Mines ==
=== Edie Creek ===
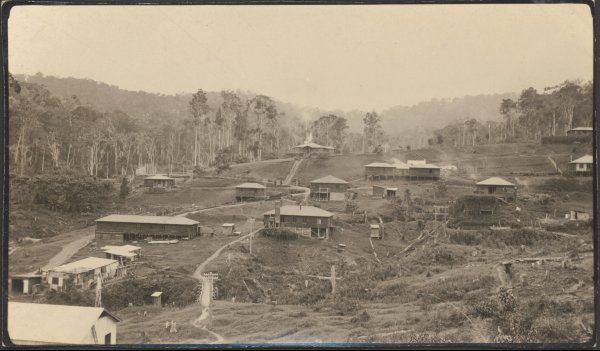
Edie Creek, Central New Guinea, 1936.

Edie Creek has been a historic gold and silver mining area since its discovery in 1926. Located about 5 km south-west of Wau, it was the centre of one of the first major gold rushes in PNG before World War II. Large amounts of gold have been extracted by both alluvial and underground mining. Brothers William and Stanley Royal found gold at Edie Creek in 1926. On 16 July 1951, a Qantas Drover aircraft crashed into the sea near Lae carrying gold belonging to the Bulolo Gold Dedging Company. It is believed that 35,000 pounds worth of gold bullion was on board. It was recovered later by special divers. The remains can be seen here.

=== Frieda River ===
The Frieda River Project is situated on the border of Sandaun and East Sepik Provinces on a tributary of the Sepik River.

=== Hidden Valley/Hamata ===
Hidden Valley is an open-pit, gold-silver mine and processing plant in Morobe Province. The mine is approximately 210 km north-north-west of Port Moresby, and 90 km south-southwest of Lae. It is operated by Morobe Mining Joint Ventures, a 50:50 joint venture between Harmony, a company that operates primarily in South Africa, and Newcrest, an Australian gold and copper mining company. The metals are epithermal deposits from hydrothermal systems related to volcanic activity.

=== Kainantu ===
Construction of the Kainantu Gold Mine, now often referred to as K92, began in March 2004 and commenced operations in March 2006. In 2004 Landowners threatened to close down Highlands Pacific's Kainantu gold mine. Kainantu Gold Mine is an underground mine and the concentrate is trucked to Lae and shipped to Japan for processing. In January 2009 production was halted. The mine has been designed to produce in excess of 100,000 ounces of gold per year. In 2007, a decision was made by Highlands Pacific Ltd. to sell Kuinantu Gold mine and licences to Placer Dome Oceania, a subsidiary of Barrick Gold Corporation for a cash price of US$141.5 million. The mine is now owned and operated by K92 mining, a Canadian company.

=== Lihir ===
Lihir is an open cut gold mine operating on Lihir Island in the Bismarck Archipelago. It is wholly owned by Newcrest.

The company, incorporated in Papua New Guinea in June 1995, and named Lihir as its first project was to raise capital to build the Lihir Island gold mine was merged with Newcrest Mining at the end of August 2010 (the last day for trading of Lihir Gold shares was August 30, 2010). Australian economist Ross Garnaut served as Lihir's chairman from 1995 to 2010.

Merger talks were first made known in April 2010, with an announcement by Newcrest Mining. On Monday August 23, 2010 the A$9.5 billion takeover offer by Newcrest was approved after 99.86% of Lihir Gold Shareholders voted in favour of it. The takeover received national court of Papua New Guinea approval on August 28, 2010.

The acquisition made Newcrest Mining the world's fifth-largest gold producer with a production of 2.8 million ounces of gold (2009 combined production of the 2 companies).

=== Misima ===
Misima Island is known as a mining island. A huge mine operated many years on the island. The Misima mine was a joint venture by Placer Dome (owning 80%) and the state-owned Orogen Minerals. In March 2012, Barrick closed its post closure monitoring office in Bwagaoia having successfully rehabilitated the mine and mill sites.

Since 2004 when the mine closed, artisanal mining has become a major source of income in the island, with an association Misima Alluvial Gold Mining Association (MAGMA) starting in 2007. Other sources of income, especially for people living on the north coast, are cash crops of coconuts, copra, and cacao. A commercial fisheries project has been proposed, but has not been developed yet.

=== Mt. Kare ===
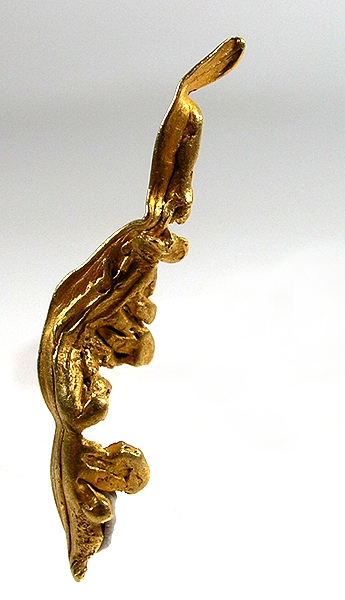
Specimen gold from Mt. Kare

=== Ok Tedi Mine ===
The Ok Tedi Mine is situated at Mount Fubilan in the Star Mountains in western PNG, close to the Indonesian border. OK Tedi Mining Limited is 100% Government owned (2014).

=== Panguna mine ===
Bougainville Copper (BC) developed the Panguna mine on Bougainville Island, producing copper concentrate from 1972 until May 1989, when mining operations were suspended due to civil unrest in the province. Rio Tinto is a major shareholder of the BC (54%) and is currently reviewing its stake in the company. The deposit has a life of mine of some 20 years and has a capacity to produce 180 000t of copper and 480 000 oz gold per year. This development marked one of the first major investments in PNG, and was at one stage one of the world's largest copper - gold mines.

As of 2014, talks of restarting mining operations in Panguna mine have continued, with BC seeking official endorsement from the Autonomous Bougainville Government and the National Government of Papua New Guinea.

=== Porgera ===
The Porgera Gold Mine is a large gold mining operation located in Enga province. The mine is located at the head of the Porgera Valley and end of the river and operated by Barrick Gold d.b.a. Porgera Joint Venture (PJV).

=== Ramu ===
The Ramu lateritic nickel-cobalt mining project is located in the Madang Province of Papua New Guinea. The 2022 annual output was 34,302 tonnes of nickel and 2,987 tonnes of cobalt contained in a mixed hydroxide intermediate product.

The project comprises the Kurumbukari mine site and beneficiation plant, and a 135 kilometres (84 mi) slurry pipeline from the mine to the Basamuk processing plant. The mine is located on the Kurumbukari plateau, on the southern side of the Ramu River Valley, 75 kilometres (47 mi) to the southwest of Madang. The processing plant site is located on the coast of Basamuk Bay, 55 kilometres (34 mi) to the southeast of Madang.

Discovered in 1962 by the Australian Bureau of Mineral Resources, the Kurumbakari project was explored intermittently by several companies. By the 1990s, Highlands Pacific completed detailed exploration followed by a feasibility study. In 2005, China Metallurgical Group Corporation (“MCC”) acquired the majority interest in the Project and Ramu NiCo Management (MCC) Limited became Manager and Operator for the Ramu Nickel Joint Venture. The mine project was commissioned in 2012 and achieved design capacity in 2017.

=== Simberi Oxide Gold Project ===
Allied Gold, an Australian-based company, operate an open pit gold (and silver) mine called the Simberi Oxide Gold Project in the volcanic highlands on the eastern side of Simberi Island Gold production started in February 2008 and the mine has a projected life of 8 years. Production for the 2008 calendar year was 75,267 ounces (2,133,787 grams).

=== Solwara 1 ===
3.789°S 152.094°E

The Solwara 1 Project is located at 1600 metres water depth in the Bismarck Sea, New Ireland Province. It will be the world's first deep sea mining project, with first production expected in 2013. The resource is high grade copper-gold resource and the world's first Seafloor Massive Sulphide (SMS) resource. Important minerals are created by the rapid cooling of the gases emerging from volcanic openings on the sea floor. In 2014 a 20-year mining license was granted to a Canadian company.

=== Woodlark ===
A mine in Milne Bay province.

== Environmental impact of mining ==
Increased mining in Papua New Guinea has caused notable environmental impacts. Papua New Guinea has permitted the direct discharge of tailings to its rivers and seas for decades.

After the construction of an open-cut gold mine and an ore-processing facility on Misima Island in 1988, large increases of sedimentation caused a decrease in tissue-layer thickness of a nearby coral reef. Mining in the Ok Tedi Mine also increased sedimentation in the Ok Tedi River by 5-10 times. The poisonous waste reaches the Fly River where it kills fish and trees, and poisons croplands and drinking water. Increased sediment load in the river has caused high concentrations of dissolved copper in the inner floodplain.

== Reserves and mineral exports ==
Papua New Guinea has large reserves of minerals and gas. The mineral exports are gold, silver, copper, nickel, and cobalt. According to the Bank of Papua New Guinea's Quarterly Economic Bulletin, the weighted average kina price of Papua New Guinea's export commodities (excluding LNG) increased by 20.7% in September 2021, compared to an increase of 2.5% in the corresponding quarter of 2020. There was an increase of 16% in the weighted average price of mineral exports, compared to an increase of 8.2% in the corresponding quarter of 2020.
