= Kaokalam =

Village in Papua New Guinea

- District: Maip Muritaka Rural LLG

Kaokalam is a village in Enga Province, Papua New Guinea. It is located 600 kilometres (372 miles) northwest of the capital, Port Moresby.

== History ==
In May 2024, the village was heavily affected by the 2024 Enga landslide.
