= Kandep District =

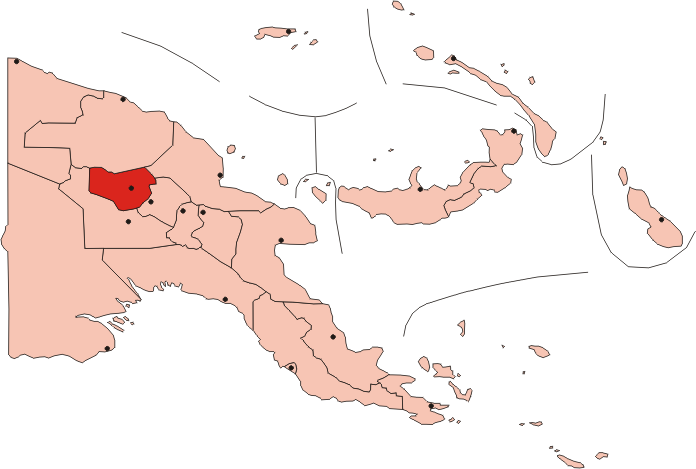
- Location of Enga Province

- Location within Papua New Guinea
- Coordinates: 5°25′S 143°30′E
- Country: Papua New Guinea
- Province: Enga Province
- Capital: Wabag
- LLGs: List: Kandep Rural LLG; Wage Rural LLG

Area
  - Total: 2,001 km^{2} (773 sq mi)
- Elevation: 2,000 m (6,600 ft)

Population (2011 census)
  - Total: 73,102
  - Density: 36.53/km^{2} (94.62/sq mi)
- Time zone: UTC+10 (AEST)

Kandep District is one of the five districts of Enga Province in Papua New Guinea. It is located in the southern part of Wabag, the capital town of Enga. Kandep shares land borders between the Laiagam-Porgera district, Wabag, and Wapenamanda District. It also shares borders with Southern Highlands, Western Highlands and the newly breakaway Hela Province. Kandep is accessible by road, and the Kandep–Laiagam Road links to Wabag which is 3 hours drive back and forth. The Kandep–Mendi road, a newly sealed road can be used to travel to Mt. Hagen via Mendi. The Kandep–Magarima Road is also connected.

Kandep was formed due to volcanic eruption of Mt. Sugarloaf, and thus has many crater lakes; the largest being the Pakelem Lake encircling Lyumbi Island.

The people of Kandep live in tribes and land is owned by individual tribes and land inheritance is through the paternal side. Kandep is situated at an altitude of 2000m above msl (7,000ft). Kandep has a population of approximately 73,000.

Kandep has two LLGs, Kandep LLG and Wage LLG with its own LLG presidents.

Constituency

For efficient service delivery, Kandep District is divided into two constituencies with its own Presidents, who is elected by the elected Councilors of each Wards. Each constituency is further divided into Wards who are run by an elected Councilor by the residents of that ward. For census purposes, the ward is further divided into census units.

Most of the information presented in the census is provide by the National Statistical Office during their country-wide census.
