= February 2024 Enga Province massacre =

2024 intertribal massacre in Enga province

Enga Province massacre
- Part of Ethnic violence in Papua New Guinea
- Location: Wapenamanda District, Enga Province, Papua New Guinea
- Date: February 18, 2024
- Attack type: Massacre
- Deaths: 49
- Perpetrator: Unknown

The February 2024 Enga Province massacre occurred on 18 February, 2024, where dozens of people were shot and 44 killed in a tribal dispute in Wapenamanda District, Enga Province, the remote highlands region of Papua New Guinea. Casualties numbered at least 49, including both combatants and bystanders.

== Background ==
Clans and tribes in New Guinea have fought each other for centuries over various disputes such as land. In more recent times, elections have been a trigger for violence with tribes aligned along local candidate and party lines.

The escalation of violence during which the massacre occurred involved around 17 tribes, including the Ambulin and Sikin tribes. Authorities had spoken to security forces about the tense situation the previous week.

== Attack ==
In retaliation for the death of a woman, her village's warriors, their allies, and mercenaries traveled to attack a neighboring tribe. At 4am on February 18, they were ambushed by men from two different tribes who had been hiding in a school building. Authorities reported that M16s, AR15s, self-loading rifles, and pump action shotguns were among the weapons used in the attack.

According to local police, officers were nearly killed as they attempted to intervene in the violence. Following the attack, bodies were found across the area, with some likely still unaccounted for as of February 19.

== Reactions ==
=== Domestic ===
Initial reports by authorities reported 64 deaths, a number later revised to 26. As bodies were recovered, the number rose again to 49.

Papua New Guinea Prime Minister James Marape expressed great concern about the situation and asked combatants to lay down their arms, saying "One killing or two killings doesn’t solve the problem. It contributes towards more problems".

Miki Kaeok, the representative for Wapenamanda in Papua New Guinea's parliament, called for a state of emergency.

Police Commissioner David Manning requested that legislation be introduced to increase police powers to "prevent acts of domestic terrorism".

Local leaders, some of whom had warriors killed in the attack, also expressed disinterest in continuing armed combat.

=== International ===
Australian prime minister Anthony Albanese announced the country was willing to assist the government of Papua New Guinea. As of February 20, the Queensland Rugby League is considering whether the Papua New Guinea Hunters will play their first Queensland Cup home games of the 2024 season in Port Moresby, due to concerns over players' safety in Papua New Guinea following the massacre.
