= Homelessness in Papua New Guinea =

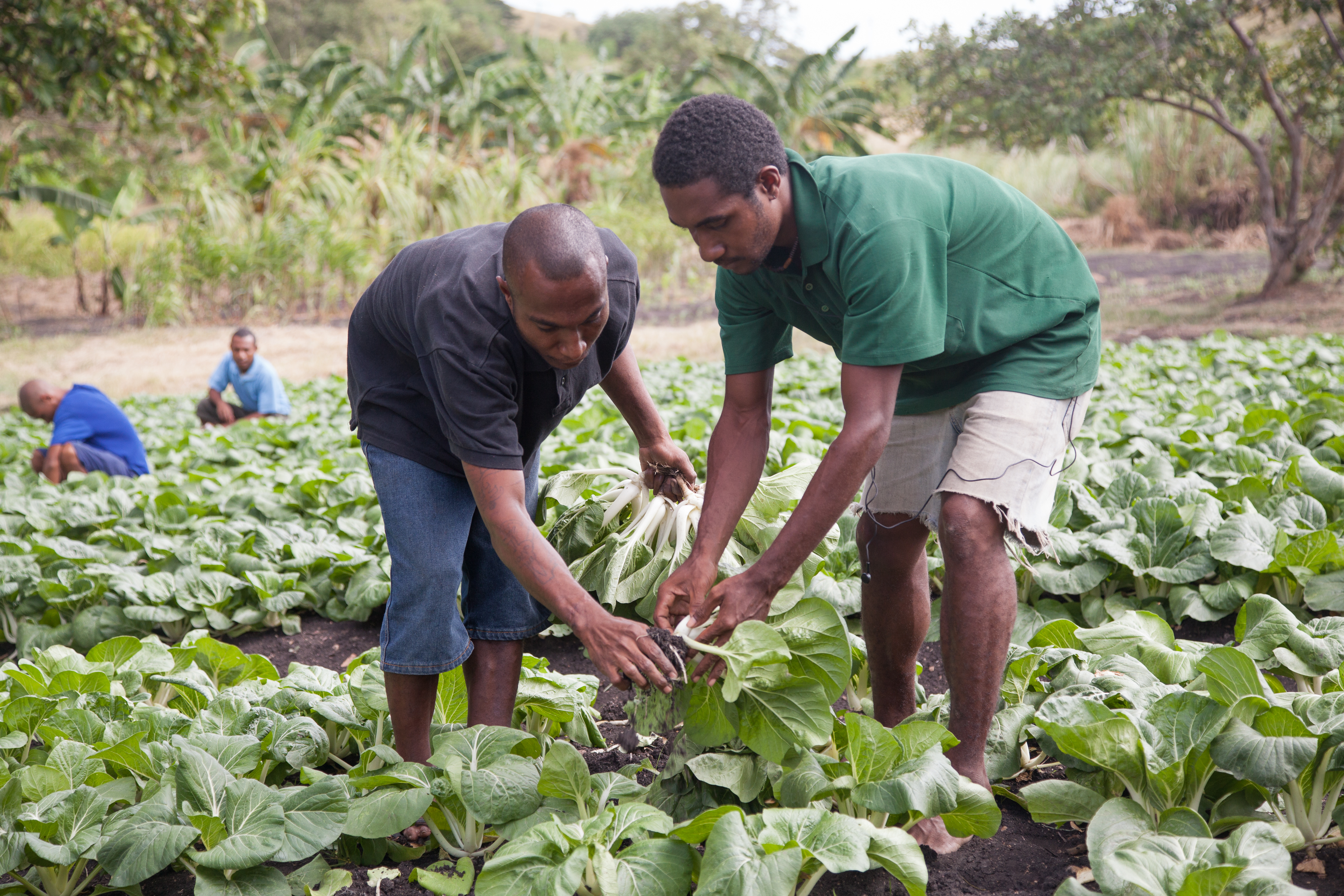
Homeless boys at City Mission Farm near Port Moresby learning various vocational skills

Homelessness is a significant issue in Papua New Guinea, particularly in the nation's capital Port Moresby. Youth are particularly vulnerable, with the capital of Papua New Guinea being home to over 5,000 homeless children. Causes of homelessness in Papua New Guinea include both natural disasters and civil unrest. Issues like malnutrition, poor mental health, and illness disproportionately affect the country's growing homeless population.

Homeless people are often referred to as "Drain Dwellers" due to their inhabitance of drainage systems. The homeless face negative discrimination and stereotyping, leading to further social disenfranchisement. Homeless encampments are often visited by politicians and homeless people often cast votes in major elections.

== Port Moresby settlements ==
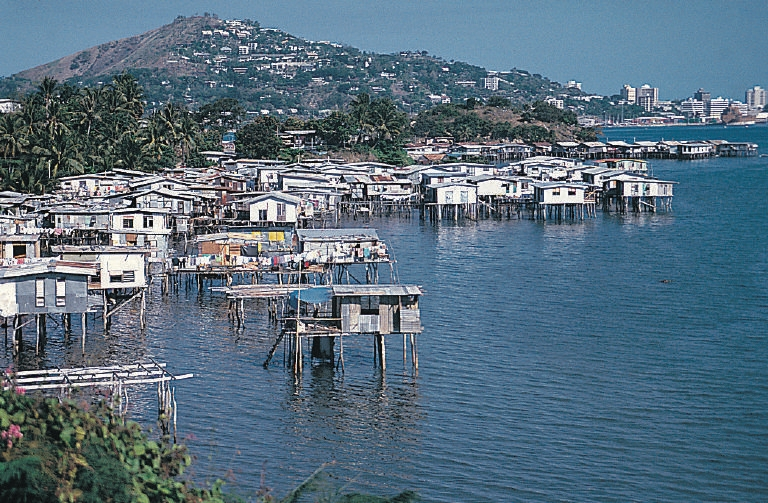
Poor coastal housing at Hanuabada in Port Moresby

People coming to Port Moresby for employment may struggle to find affordable housing. The average yearly cost to rent an apartment in Port Moresby is $13,920 AUD, whereas the average annual income for Papua New Guineans is only $3,555 AUD. In another study, a typical rental property cost 120% of household income. These conditions directly result in illegal settlements on the outskirts of town. These settlements have been said to be sources of crime. Over half of the city's population live in these urban squatter settlements, and most cities in Papua New Guinea now have some sort of urban squatter settlements. Children growing up in these settlements cannot legally inherit the land; therefore, they are subject to issues like housing insecurity and homelessness as they grow older.

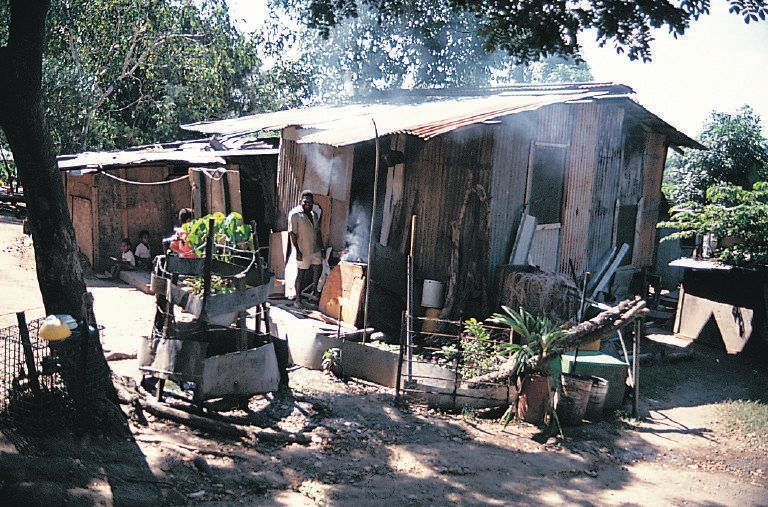
Squatters from the Highlands living at Six-Mile Rubbish Tip in Port Moresby

A large settlement on the outskirts of Port Moresby named Rabiagini was cleared by police in early 2026. The community, home to thousands and composed of squatters, was accused of being home to petty theft and illegal occupation of land. Families were given a 30-day notice before the eviction. Settlers protested, claiming that they legally purchased the land and occupied permanent homes. This land is often informally purchased from previous customary landowners, and the current occupants are unaware they do not have a legal right to live on the lot.

Papua New Guinea’s eviction campaigns leave many residents of these types of settlements homeless. In order to evict residents, homes are purposefully bulldozed or burned down by police. Some residents voluntarily deconstruct their homes in the hopes of salvaging the parts for later. After the destruction of their homes, settlers have to move elsewhere, and sometimes are forced to live in places like abandoned cars or buses. The head of the Catholic Church of Papua New Guinea, Sir John Cardinal Ribat, has criticized the evictions, citing the increase of homelessness, and urging the government to invest in more infrastructure for youth.

These settlements are not immune to natural disasters, such as fires, that destroy the shelters. In 2017, a fire that broke out in the Hanuabada Village settlement left over 150 of its residents homeless. Women in these settlements are also more vulnerable to prostitution.

== Causes of homelessness ==
=== Natural disasters ===
Other instances of homelessness include families who have lost their homes due to natural disasters. Common issues include flooding, earthquakes, cyclones, and landslides. Papua New Guinea sits on the Ring of Fire, a tectonic belt notorious for its earthquakes and volcanic activity. Climate change is affecting Papua New Guinea in particular. The country's low-lying Carteret Islands have observed a sea-level rise that is threatening their homes.

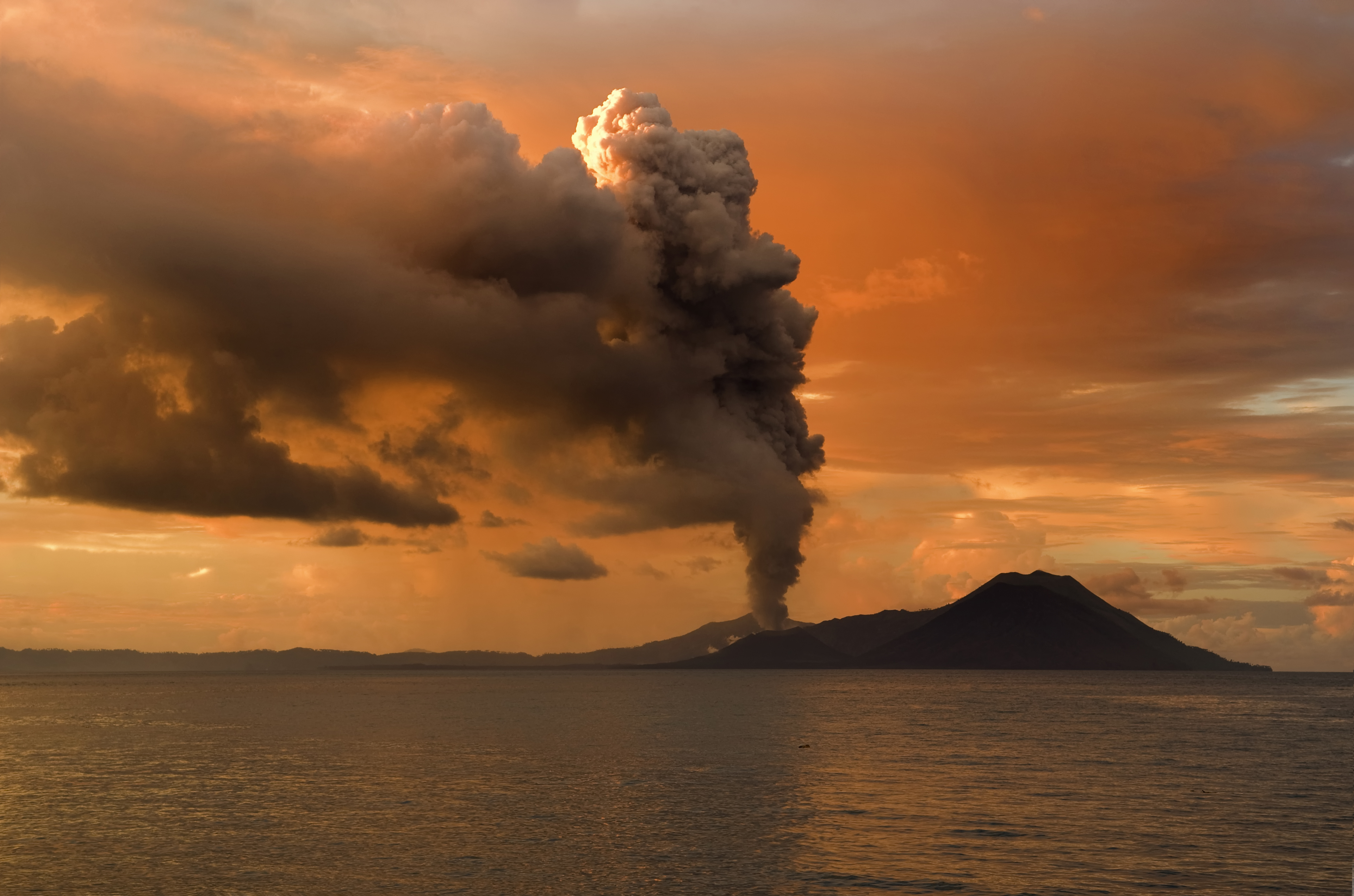
Tuvurvur volcano, part of Rabaul Caldera

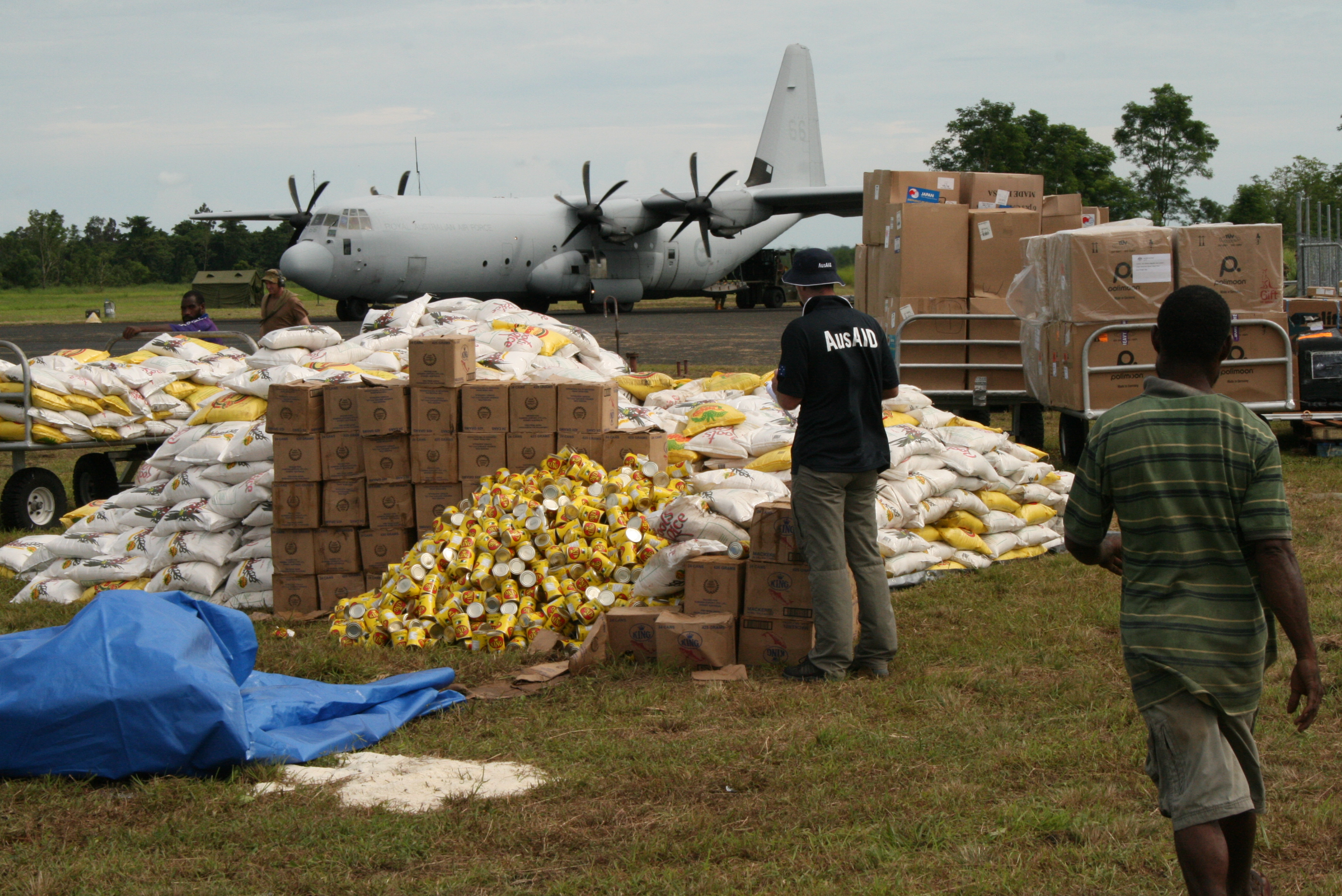
Lives were lost and major bridges, water supplies, crops and villages in Oro Province were destroyed by flooding associated with Cyclone Guba

Around 30,000 people became homeless in 1998 after heavy rains flooded the Sepik and Ramu Rivers and left over 50 villages underwater. In 2017, around 500 people became homeless following floods in the Eastern Highlands Province. In 2007, some 13,000 people became homeless following flooding in the Northern Province. After heavy rains caused the Waghi River in the Dei area of Western Highlands to flood, around 700 residents were left homeless. Approximately 25 hectares of land were underwater, including homes, farmland, and livestock-inhabited area.

In 2018, a magnitude 7.5 earthquake struck Papua New Guinea and destroyed many homes in the Southern Highlands province. The Urila care centre, operated by the International Committee of the Red Cross, provided temporary shelter and relief for affected families. It was estimated that 35,000 people living in the Highlands were displaced. A later earthquake in 2022 left nearly 8,000 students at the University of Goroka homeless.

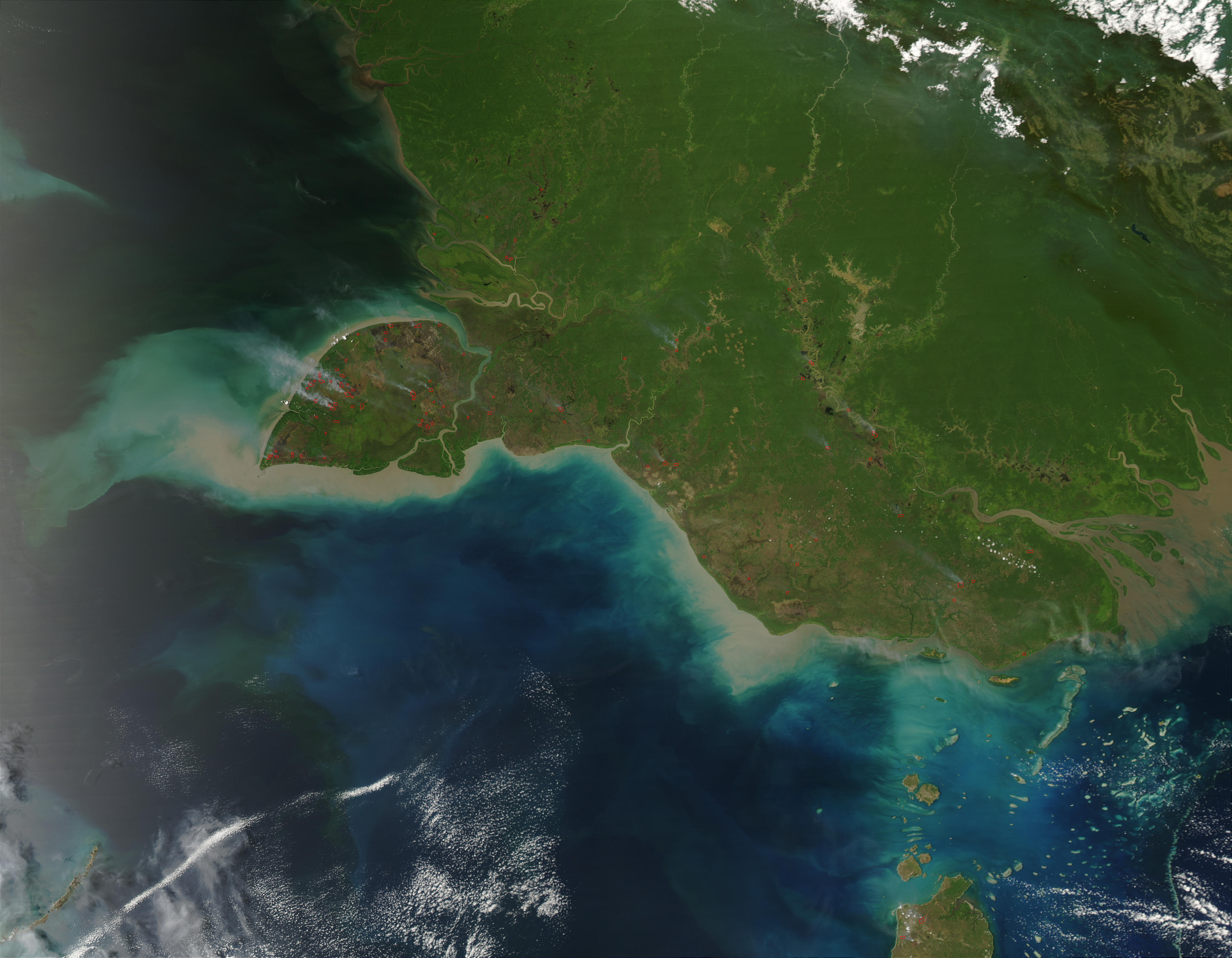
Fires on the island of New Guinea in 2002

Category five Cyclone Maila left hundreds of people homeless across the western Pacific in 2026. This included residents of small islands in Papua New Guinea's Milne Bay Province. The earlier 2014 Cyclone Ita left 5,000 homeless in Milne Bay. In addition, the natural disaster also destroyed gardens that were supplying residents with food.

A 2024 landslide destroyed over 150 homes in Yambali. Following the landslide, an additional 250 houses were also marked as unfit to inhabit due to shifting ground. Combined, these measures left 1,250 people of the village homeless.

Two back-to-back volcanic eruptions of Mount Ulawun and another volcano in 2018 left over 13,000 homeless. Homes were coated in ash and lava, destroying them entirely.

=== Civil unrest ===
Conflicts between communities in smaller towns and villages can lead to increased homelessness. Tribal conflict has directly led to rape and attacks on women and children, often with the consequence of homelessness. The introduction of firearms has worsened the situation in recent years.

In 2026, following a conflict in the Nanuk area of East New Britain province, 22 families' homes were burned down, leaving them homeless. In 2011, protests following the rape of a young woman in Lae, Papua New Guinea's second largest city, directly led to the burning down of homes. After a woman was gang-raped by over 24 men of an opposing tribe in 2017, she was left homeless and had to take refuge in impermanent shelters.

=== Unsafe housing conditions ===
In Lae, the Bumbu police barracks were condemned, forcing 100 policemen and their families into homelessness.

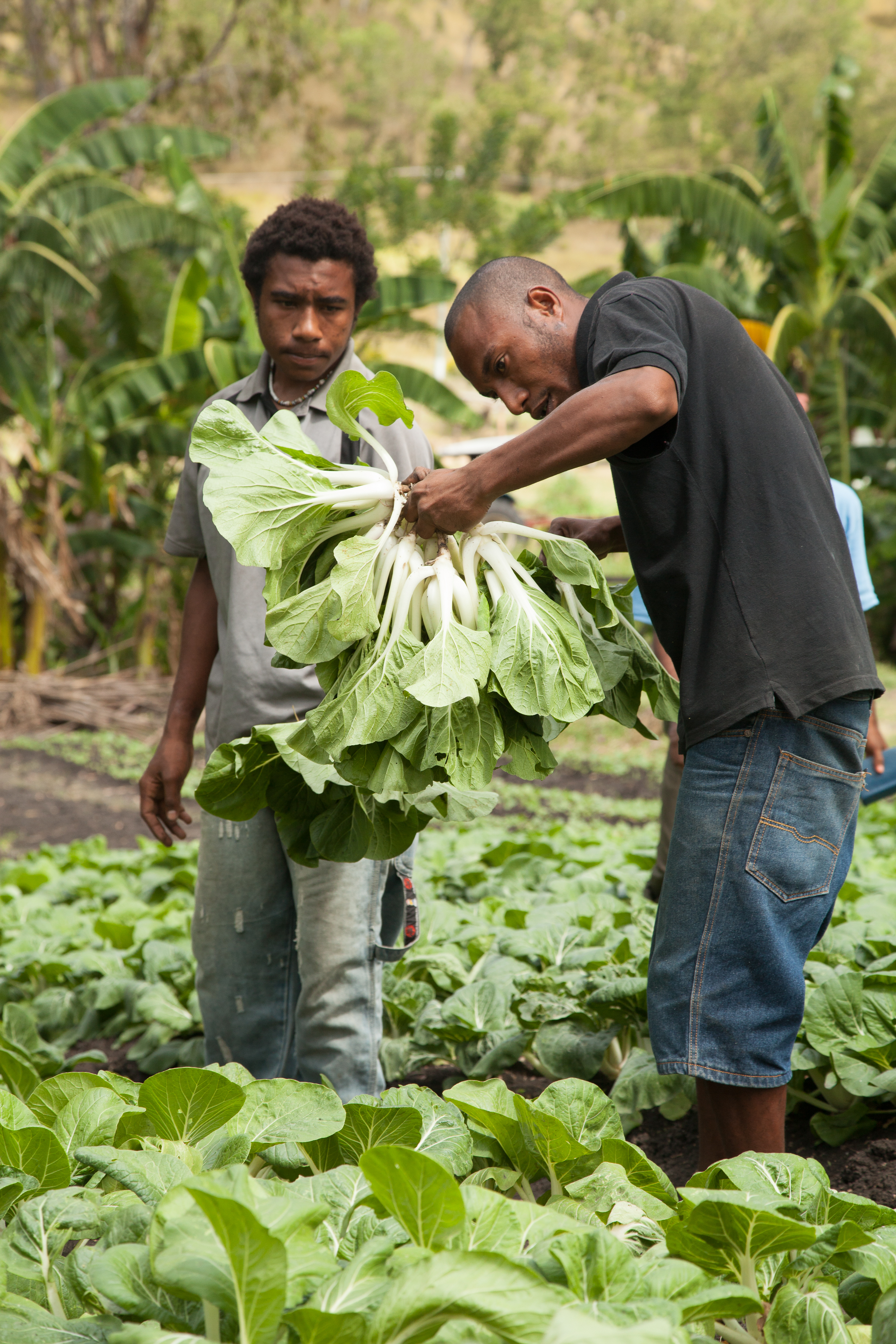
Homeless boys at the Christian NGO City Mission Farm learning vocational skills

== Religious outreach ==
Religious institutions have played a large role in the support of Papua New Guinea's homeless population. Mother Teresa visited the country multiple times, the first in 1972, and established a charity. Faith-based City Mission provides vocational training to homeless youth.

Sir John Cardinal Ribat, the head of the Catholic Church of Papua New Guinea, has publicly criticized the government's evictions of squatter communities in the outskirts of Port Moresby for its creation of further homelessness.

== Youth homelessness ==
As of 2018, it is estimated that the homeless population in the nation's capital includes over 5,000 homeless children. The government and charities working in the region state that migration from rural to urban areas are a leading cause for the rise in homelessness.

The Malaysian Association of Papua New Guinea raises around 1 million kina annually for the support of homeless youth in Port Moresby.

=== Working street children ===
One study on working street children in Papua New Guinea surveyed 324 children, of which seven percent were currently living on the street, but overall, 51% had been living on the street at one point in the past. Children sell items like bottles in order to buy food.

=== Refugees ===
Children from other countries who have refugee status in Papua New Guinea have also become homeless. A 17-year-old who fled persecution from Iran became homeless after a disagreement with his housemate in Lae.

== Government responses ==
The government of Papua New Guinea has been criticized for the lack of support it provides to the homeless community. In addition, it has been criticized for the eviction of urban squatter settlements, further exacerbating the crisis. Critics have said that in cases where eviction is inevitable, the government needs to ensure proper support is put into place to limit resulting housing crises. National Office of Child and Family Service (NOCFS) is tasked with providing a response to homelessness.

In 2023, the Papua New Guinean government pledged to build up to 2,000 homes in the Port Moresby area that are climate-friendly in an effort to mitigate homelessness. They will receive support from the International Finance Corporation.

=== Population census ===
Papua New Guinea conducts a population and housing census once every decade. The 2011 Papua New Guinea census was criticized for inaccurately counting the number of homeless Papua New Guineans due to a low estimated birth rate that potentially undercounted homeless children.

=== Legislation ===
- Lukautim Pikinini (Child) Act 2009

== Active charities ==
- Life Care PNG
- City Mission
- Women of Hope Shelter
