= Wage Rural LLG =

Local-level government in Papua New Guinea

- Country: Papua New Guinea
- Province: Enga Province
- Time zone: UTC+10 (AEST)

Wage Rural LLG in Kandep District is one of the two Local-Level Governments (LLGs) of the Kandep District of Enga Province, Papua New Guinea. It is located at Southern part of Wabag, capital town of [Enga Province]. Kandep shares land borders between Laiagam - Porgera, Wabag, and Wapenimanda District. Also shares borders with Southern Highland, Western highlands and newly breakaway Provinces of Hela.

Kandep is accessible by road. Kandep - Laiagam Road linking to Wabag is 3 hours drive back and forth. The Kandep - Mendi road is under construction. The Kandep - Magarima Road also provides a connection.

Wage LLG comprises council wards from Upper and Lower Wage. The Lai River which flows from north to south divides the District into two LLGs. The eastern part is called the Lai LLG and the western part called the Wage LLG. Magarima in the newly established Hela Province can be accessible from the Lower Wage (Titip) by road. However, the road connection between Kandep and Magarima is connected by a bridge which sometimes sinks in the Kandep swamp. Several companies have been contracted to carry out the maintenance and reconstruction of the bridge but up till now, no work has progressed.

It is the lack of bridge that people cross over from Kandep by wooden canoes and either walk all the way or by chance catch one of the two PMVs which make scheduled trips to Magarima.

== Wards ==
- 01. Yumbis
- 02. Karekare
- 03. Longap
- 04. Mamal
- 05. Peliyanjak
- 06. Porokale
- 07. Titengis
- 08. Kitali
- 09. Kumbanda
- 10. Sitindak
- 11. Kuikale
- 12. Andokoe
- 13. Bioko
- 14. Imapiak
- 15. Kanean
- 16. Kinduli
- 17. Laguni
- 18. Maru
- 19. Rumbipak
- 20. Titip
- 21. Nerep
- 22. Waip
- 23. Kondaka
