= Marcopper mining disaster =

Philippine mining accident on March 24, 1996

The Marcopper mining disaster is one of the worst mining and environmental disasters in Philippine history. It occurred on March 24, 1996, on the Philippine island of Marinduque, a province of the Philippines located in the Mimaropa region. The disaster led to drastic reforms in the country's mining policy.

A fracture in the drainage tunnel of a large pit containing leftover mine tailings led to a discharge of toxic mine waste into the Makulapnit-Boac river system and caused flash floods in areas along the river. One village, Barangay Hinapulan, was buried in six feet of muddy floodwater, causing the displacement of 400 families. Twenty other villages had to be evacuated. Drinking water was contaminated killing fish and freshwater shrimp. Large animals such as cows, pigs and sheep were overcome and killed. The flooding caused the destruction of crops and irrigation channels. Following the disaster, the Boac River was declared unusable.

== History ==
Marcopper Mining was a Canadian corporation that officially started its copper mining operations in 1969 at the Mt. Tapian Ore Deposit on Marinduque Island in the Philippines. When the Mt. Tapian reserve was depleted in 1990, Marcopper moved its operations to the San Antonio copper mine, three kilometers north of the Mt. Tapian site. Mine tailings from the Mt. Tapian site were discharged into Calancan Bay. It is estimated that 84 million metric tons of mine tailings were discharged into the shallow bay between 1975 and 1988. Complaints from local residents led to the Mt. Tapian open-cut mine site being converted to receive mine tailings from the San Antonio mine on a temporary basis. Marcopper plugged up the Mt. Tapian pit with a concrete fixture to allow it to act as a disposal lake for the mining waste. The use of the Tapian Pit as a waste containment system was unconventional. Environmental risk assessment and management had not been carried out by Marcopper.

The Marinduque Mines operated by Marcopper dumped waste into the shallow bay of Calancan for 16 years, totaling 200 million tons of toxic tailings. When exposed to ocean breezes, the tailings, which partially floated, become airborne and landed on rice fields, in open water wells, and on village homes. Local residents called this their "Snow from Canada." This "Snow from Canada," consisting of mine tailings, forced 59 children to undergo lead detoxification in the Philippine capital of Manila. At least three children died from heavy metal poisoning.

== Mining disaster ==
This disaster at the Marcopper Mines on Marinduque made headlines around the world. In August 1996, a significant leak was discovered in the pit's drainage tunnel. The leak caused a fracture which discharged tailings into the Makulapnit-Boac river system. This released over 1.6 million cubic meters of tailings along 27 km of the river and coastal areas. The impact on the river and the people who depended on it for their livelihoods was severe. The rush of tailings displaced river water which inundated low-lying areas, destroying crops and vegetable gardens and clogged irrigation channels supplying water to rice fields. The release left the Boac River virtually unusable. The effects of the incident were so devastating that a United Nations assessment mission declared the accident to be a major environmental disaster. The Tapian pit contained around 23 million metric tons of mine waste. Officials of the DENR (Department of Environment and Natural Resources) claimed they did not know of the presence of the drainage tunnel that measured 2.6 kilometers long and 1 meter wide which was located underneath the pit, which led to the Makulapnit and Boac river system.

The toxic spill caused flash floods which isolated five villages, with populations of 4,400 people each, along the far side of the Boac river. One village, Barangay Hinapulan, was buried under six feet of muddy floodwater, causing 400 families to flee to higher grounds. Sources of drinking water were contaminated with toxins. Fish, freshwater shrimp and pigs were killed outright. Helicopters had to fly in food, water and medical supplies to the isolated villages. The inhabitants of 20 of the 60 villages in the province were told to evacuate.

== Aftermath ==
The government estimates this toxic tailings waste killed ₱1.8 million worth of freshwater and marine life and ₱5 million milk fish fry. The 27-kilometer Boac river, which was the main source of livelihood for those who did not work for Marcopper, was declared unusable by government officials.

After the disaster, Marcopper and Placer Dome closed all their mines. The government attempted to cover up the fact they had not enforced environmental laws throughout the years. The local residents in Marinduque have claimed they knew about the tunnel for almost 20 years. Evidence came to light that Marcopper knew of the leak in the drainage tunnel in advance of the accident, as there had been a long history of problems regarding the tunnel and pit.

=== Health issues ===
On 17 April 1996, a Department of Health (DOH) report said that residents may already be harboring quantities of zinc and copper beyond tolerable limits. Nine residents were found to have zinc in their blood more than 200% above safe levels. Water samples also revealed dangerous levels of contamination i.e. 1,300% above the human tolerable level of 0.5 microgram per 1/1,000 litres of water. Residents complained of skin irritations and respiratory problems which could have been caused by poisonous vapors such as hydrogen sulfide and nitrous oxide from mine wastes. Despite the findings, Marcopper claimed the tailings were non-toxic.

In 2016, the DOH regional office called Marinduque a health emergency due to the effects of the Marcopper disaster.

=== Policy reforms ===
A year before the disaster, the Philippine Mining Act was enacted to push for the liberalization of the country's mining industry. The Marcopper mining disaster led to significant changes in the government's mining policies. The disaster prompted government to revise the rules of the Mining Act to focus more on the protection of the environment and address social issues. Higher standards for rehabilitation were set and stronger provisions on no-go areas were put into place. Consultations with local governments and indigenous communities also became a priority.

=== Investigation and findings ===
Oxfam, an international development and humanitarian aid agency with projects in the Philippines was approached by Marinduque community members for help. Oxfam Australia's Mining Ombudsman took their case and released a report. The report calls on Placer Dome to complete an environmental clean-up, adequately compensate affected communities, and take steps to prevent future disasters. The report updates similar findings made by the United States Geological Survey in July 2004. As of 2005 Placer Dome (which ran the mine at the time of the disaster) was the sixth largest gold mining company in the world and was listed on the Toronto Stock Exchange, but it has since been acquired and is no longer an independent company. At the time of the incident Marinduque was identified as among the 44 poorest of the 80 provinces in the Philippines.

Inspection of the site has been difficult because the area is off-limits, even to environment and local officials.

=== Legal action and awarding of damages ===
On October 4, 2005, the provincial government of Marinduque sued Marcopper's parent company, Placer Dome, for $100 million in damages. Placer Dome was purchased in 2006 by Barrick Gold, who has joined the lawsuit.

As of 2017, the provincial government had been preparing to file a new case against Placer Dome and Barrick Gold for environmental damage in the municipalities of Boac and Mogpog.

In 2022, the Marinduque regional trial court ordered Marcopper Mining Corporation to pay damages to more than 30 plaintiffs, ruling on a case filed in 2001 that the collapse of Marcopper's siltation dam on December 6, 1993, resulted in significant harm to properties and agriculture. The decision mandated Marcopper to compensate each of the plaintiffs with ₱200,000 for temperate damages and ₱100,000 for moral damages. The decision also required Marcopper to pay a total of ₱1 million as exemplary damages for all the plaintiffs.

== See also ==
- Marinduque
- Placer Dome
- Barrick Gold
