= Timbarra Gold Mine =

Mine in New South Wales, Australia

Timbarra
- Location in Australia
- Location: Tenterfield, New South Wales, Australia; 29°07′S 152°18′E
- Closed: 2001

The Timbarra Gold Mine was a highly controversial gold mine located on the Timbarra Plateau, at the head waters of the Clarence River, near Tenterfield, New South Wales, Australia. The gold ore body consisted of a greisen type granite. The protracted controversy attracted national and international attention, and catalysed an anti-cyanide extraction campaign in Australia.

== Mine history ==
The mine was initially developed in the late 1990s by a medium-sized mining company, Ross Mining. After six months the mine went into "care and maintenance", and never re-opened. Delta Gold acquired the mine through a take-over of Ross Mining. Eventually the mine was acquired by Placer Dome who were in turn taken over in 2006 by Barrick Gold.

Placer Dome undertook an intensive rehabilitation programme at the mine site, setting new standards for mining rehabilitation in New South Wales.

Precious Metal Resources ( ASX: PMR ) has applied for an exploration licence over the mine and is planning to develop the project and start job creation in the area. The senior management at PMR have continued their extensive research in the project and believe over the coming years they will be able to reopen the mine and start production.

The Timbarra Gold Mine has in excess of 300MT of Resource.

== Controversy ==
Timbarra Gold Mine was subject to intensive protest for several reasons:

- High diversity of threatened species, including rare frogs, on the site.
- Disturbance to an Aboriginal site.
- Unsuitable site for heap-leach cyanide mining due to wetland conditions and high rainfall.

Ross Mining countered the criticism with arguments in favour of the mine:

- Mine provided needed employment and economic stimulus to the local Tenterfield district.
- Mine site was not pristine, being subject to disturbance from previous mining.

Anti-mine action took on different forms:

- Direct action, including roadblocks by protestors, with over 100 arrests.
- Court cases by Aboriginal native title claimants and environmentalists.
- An intensive media campaign.

The controversy surrounding the mine was the subject of a 2002 documentary, Demon Fault, which was commissioned by Australia's Special Broadcasting Service and featured miners, protesters, environmental and legal specialists, local farmers and landowners in a protracted battle over the mining operation.

The mine is now owned by an Australian ASX company called Precious Metal Resources ( ASX:PMR)

== Litigation ==
The project was the subject of litigation in the NSW courts. Ross Mining NL had been granted a development consent by the Tenterfield Shire Council pursuant to the Environmental Planning and Assessment Act 1979, which required a Species Impact Statement to be submitted with an application for development consent if the development is "likely to significantly affect threatened species". The respondent did not submit a Species Impact Statement, and the Timbarra Protection Coalition sought to rely upon this to invalidate the development consent. Talbot J who heard the Class 4 proceedings in the Land and Environment Court held that the decision of the Council to accept the application without a Species Impact Statement was not reviewable as it was not an error of jurisdictional fact and, accordingly, refused to admit evidence on the issue of "likely to significantly affect threatened species". The decision of Talbot J of the Land and Environment Court was appealed to the Court of Appeal. The central issue for determination was whether the decision of council to accept a development application without a Species Impact Statement was reviewable. The Court of Appeal had to rule on the question of whether a development 'likely to significantly affect threatened species' involves a jurisdictional fact and whether evidence of the existence or non-existence of that fact was admissible in appeal from council's decision. Spigelman CJ held that the issue of "likely to significantly affect threatened species" involves a jurisdictional fact. It was held that the decision of council regarding need for a Species Impact Statement was reviewable and related evidence was admissible.

== Closure ==
The mine was closed in 2001 after heavy rainfall resulted in two successive overflows from the cyanide ponds vindicated concerns about the site. Fortunately, cyanide extraction had ceased and actual cyanide levels were low.

Then owners, Delta Gold, undertook a Mine Closure Plan which included former protestors as stakeholders. This resulted in a pioneering consensus approach to the rehabilitation that continued throughout the Mine's ownership by Placer Dome.

The impact from the improved road access to the mine site is an ongoing concern to environmentalists as it has opened up the Timbarra Plateau to potential development, especially agriculture.

== See also ==
- Mining in Australia
- Environmental issues in Australia
