= Kompiam Rural LLG =

Local-level government in Papua New Guinea

- Country: Papua New Guinea
- Province: Enga Province
- Time zone: UTC+10 (AEST)

Kompiam Rural LLG is a local-level government (LLG) of Enga Province, Papua New Guinea.

== Wards ==
- 01. Silim
- 02. Birip
- 03. Wapai
- 04. Sauanda
- 05. Aiyulites
- 06. Pomanda
- 07. Kipilimanda
- 08. Kompiam Station
- 09. Imbilik
- 10. Kaipures
- 11. Waibukam/Waipukam
- 12. Kaindan
- 13. Winikos
- 14. Laiagam
- 15. Yamanda
- 16. Lingenas/Lengenas
- 17. Rum
- 18. Paip
- 19. Pagalilyam
- 20. Aperas
- 21. Kiokai
- 22. Liap
- 23. Ipmauanda
- 24. Lapalama
- 25. Lyiamanda
- 26. Rudisau
- 27. Lailam No. 1
- 28. Keman
- 29. Paimanda
- 30. Pulipas
- 31. Alakul
- 32. Kaimas
- 33. Yaumanda
- 34. Samaremanda
- 35. Yawalimanda
- 36. Aipanda
- 37. Amaimal
- 38. Makale
