= Porgera Landowners Association =

Papua New Guinean group

The Porgera Landowners Association (PLOA) was formed in the late 1980s and incorporated in 1992. Its objectives are to represent the 10,000 landowners with traditional land around the Porgera Gold Mine and serve as a pressure group on behalf of the landowners, and to pursue landowner claims in the courts in Port Moresby. The PLOA is funded by royalties from the mine, so that the mine pays for the institution established to oppose it.

Porgera Gold Mine was built by Vancouver-based Placer Dome, and began operations in 1990. It is one of the world's top ten gold mines, producing over 16 million ounces up to 2009. The mine, which is operated by Porgera Joint Venture (PJV), has been 95% owned by Toronto-based Barrick Gold Corporation following Barrick's takeover of Placer Dome in 2006.

== Funding ==
2% of the mine's total sales, less selling expenses, are paid out as royalties to the provincial government and various local bodies. The PLOA receives 12% of the mine's royalties. Since 2005 the PLOA has received:

- 2004 PGK3.1 million [$1 million]
- 2005 PGK2.8 million [$868,000]
- 2006 PGK2.2 million [$700,000]
- 2007 PGK2.5 million [$875,000]
- 2008 PGK3.6 million [$1.4 million]
- 2009 PGK3.6 million [$1.7 million]
- 2010 PGK4.2 million [$2 million]

The 2011 royalty is expected to be greater due to higher gold prices.

== Leadership ==
The office holders of the PLOA are elected by one representative of each of the 24 sub-clans that own traditional land in and around PJV's mining area. At a special meeting of the PLOA in July 1995, Mark Ekepa was elected as Chairman of the PLOA, and he has been the Chairman ever since. Originally the chairman was supposed to be subject to an annual election. In January 2001 Ekepa was re-elected Chairman and he changed the constitution so that an election was only required every five years.

== Advocacy activities ==
The PLOA has been the most vocal critic of PJV's mining activities. Mark Ekepa characterises his role as a David and Goliath struggle with Barrick Gold. Since 2007 he has travelled every year to Barrick's Annual General Meeting in Toronto, Canada, to protest against environmental and human rights abuses by PJV, though he missed the 2011 meeting due to flight delays. Ekepa's main objective is to force the mine to pay for a mass relocation of every member of the community who lives within the immediate area of the mine.

In 2008 the PLOA formed the Porgera Alliance, an umbrella body, to seek justice for human rights and environmental abuse, both in Porgera and the country as a whole.

In April 2009 Mark Ekepa travelled to Port Moresby with the stated intention of meeting the Prime Minister Michael Somare, in order to withdraw the PLOA's support for the police deployment to Porgera. The police had allegedly burnt down 300 houses belonging to local landowners. On behalf of the landowners, Paulus Dowa Lawyers threatened to sue the National Police Commissioner Gari Baki and the Minister of Internal Security Sambi Rambi for destruction of property.

Mark Ekepa met James Cameron, the director of the science fiction film Avatar, in New York City in 2010. Cameron said to Ekepa that the film was premised on ‘the struggles of people like yours’.

The PLOA, supported by an international non-profit organisation MiningWatch Canada, launched a complaint in March 2011 against Barrick Gold and PJV with the Canadian National Contact Point, the mediator for breaches of OECD Guidelines for Multinational Enterprises. The complaint alleges that living conditions amongst the community around the mine are incompatible with OECD guidelines, that PJV's private security staff have abused and killed members of the community, and that public security forces have evicted and destroyed homes. The complaint also raises concerns about the mine's riverine tailings disposal, and the mine's impact on air quality.

The Canadian National Contact Point has informally met both sides, and both sides have agreed to enter into mediation.

== Controversies ==
=== Patricide ===
Mark Ekepa reportedly shot his father in the head at close range in 1996 during a public argument over mine compensation money. The killing meant that Ekepa took his father's place as one of the most important tribal leaders in Porgera, and that he was able to take control of the PLOA. Ekepa was never convicted for killing his father.

=== Financial transparency ===
Since becoming Chairman of the PLOA in 1995, Mark Ekepa has become a wealthy individual. He has property, businesses, and has a reputation for buying new cars. While Ekepa has become a voice on the global stage, those in the Porgera community distrust him due to the PLOA's lack of financial transparency.

The PLOA continually refuses to publish its accounts, despite considerable efforts by landowners to access this information. Many landowners have complained that the leadership of the PLOA have been embezzling royalty payments that should otherwise benefit ordinary landowners.

In 2000 a visiting anthropologist from the University of Chicago recorded that the PLOA had received PGK5.5 million [$2.1 million] in royalties from PJV during the previous six years, and that only PGK300,000 [$114,000] remained in the PLOA bank accounts, whilst there was no record of how the rest of the money had been spent. The head of the Porgera Development Authority had asked PricewaterhouseCoopers to look at the PLOA's books.

=== Misappropriation charges ===
In April 2005 Mark Ekepa was arrested by police in Mount Hagen on charges of misappropriation. He was released on bail of PGK5,000 [$1,600].

In March 2005 this issue had come to the attention of Prime Minister Sir Michael Somare, who wrote to Government Secretary Joshua Kalinoe complaining that the mine royalties were being hijacked by third parties and middlemen.

=== Rivalries ===
When Mark Ekepa was elected the PLOA Chairman in 1995 he had defeated fellow Porgeran William Gaupe. Twice Mark Ekepa had to defend his leadership of the PLOA in Papua New Guinea's National Court, first in 2000, and again in 2004, when William Gaupe had been elected the new Chairman of the PLOA at a special community meeting. Ekepa overturned Gaupe's election victory in the National Court.

William Gaupe was popular in Porgera for having led a gang raid on PJV's drilling contractor in 1987, when he stole a safe containing cash and all the passports of the expatriate workers, and was chased by PJV's helicopter up the mountain. Gaupe gave himself up to the police and served two years in prison.

In 2005 Ekepa was criticised by a rival Porgeran leader for never having called for the government to investigate suspected community deaths on the mine site. Jonah Pilah Kipu, the chairman of a Porgera youth association, said that Ekepa had only first spoken out about the issue - some 21 suspected deaths over 15 years - after being arrested by the police on charges of misappropriation.

Some Porgerans allege that Ekepa maintains his control of the PLOA by rigging the organisation's elections.

=== International NGOs ===
International NGOs, which fund Mark Ekepa's annual trips to North America, have been criticised for legitimising Ekepa by their association with him.
