= Pilikambi Rural LLG =

Local-level government in Papua New Guinea

- Country: Papua New Guinea
- Province: Enga Province
- Time zone: UTC+10 (AEST)

Pilikambi Rural LLG is one of the four Local-Level Government Areas (LLGs) of Lagaip Porgera Electorate in Enga Province, Papua New Guinea. The other three LLGs in the district are Maip-Mulitaka Rural, Paiela-Hewa Rural and Porgera.

== Name ==
The name PiliKambi is extracted from two main tribes along the Lagaip River. They are Apulin (Pili-Apul which means rain) and Sambe (Kambi which refers to the Eagle, born out of an Eagle.)

== Government ==
The Pilikambi LLG has one President, 19 Village Councillors and 2 appointed women reps. The main Pilikambi government station and council chamber is in Kepelam Village. Kepelam village is owned by both Sambe and Apulin tribes and is looked after by its traditional Chief Akem.

Pilikambi Sub District is the home to Lake Lau, the Mighty Lagaip river (head of Strickland and Fly), Aipiandak salt Lake, Mt Sugarloaf, and many great rivers like Sepik and Purari originates from the Yopos Plateau near Lake Lau. Tee or Moka is common amongst the Pilikambi people.

== Notable people ==
Some of Papua New Guinea's great men originate from Pilikambi. These include Sir Tei Abal, First Opposition Leader, his son Sam Abal, Paul Paken Torato, Kundapen Kelvin Talyaga, Basil Murian and the Current Governor of Enga Grand Chief Peter Ipatas. Ipatas, Murian and Talyaga hail from Apulin tribes whilst Abal and Torato come from the Sambe tribe. Abal and Torato come from the same clan of Temaga Tiagan of Yaingel Valley while Murian and Talyaga come from the same clan Sikita and same sub-clan Nerul.

== Economy ==
Pilikambi is the most disadvantaged sub district in Papua New Guinea in terms of Economic sustainability. They hardly have any cash crops and income source.

== Infrastructure ==
Health, Education, and infrastructural services are general run down. They only have the Catholic run St. Christopher Sub Health Centre at Kepelam followed by the government run Yango Sub district Health Centre supported by Kupitu, Pokeras and a number of Aid Posts. Pilikambi High School and a number of Primary schools and many Elementary School are there but the operations are affected mainly by the road conditions and tribal fights. The newly built Lii Road cross cutting from Wabag-Kepelam-Kandep is only accessed by Four Wheel Drives.

== Tourism ==
In the west of the Sub District headquarters lies the Lake Lau. A guide is recommended but you would find the Andati, Tanzen, Sikita, Kaiti, Talyulu, Epoko and Tiagan clansmen People.

== Religion ==
Pilikambi is mainly Catholic followed by Lutherans, Christian Apostolic Fellowship (CAF), Seventh-Day Adventists (SDA) and other Pentecostal churches.

== Wards ==
Wards of Pilikambi Rural LLG:

- 01. Kinapulama
- 02. Yokonda
- 03. Tupangus
- 04. Porgeras
- 05. Yangil
- 06. Kailam
- 07. Landelam
- 08. Piyakain
- 09. Tumbiop
- 10. Kanamanda
- 11. Kepelam
- 12. Mapomanda
- 13. Papayuku
- 14. Kipos
- 15. Pulukus
- 16. Kanak
- 17. Yango
- 18. Tendep
- 19. Lyamala
