= Frieda River Airport =

- IATA: FAQ; ICAO: AYFR

Summary
- Airport type: Public
- Location: Frieda River, Papua New Guinea
- Elevation AMSL: 200 ft (61 m)
- Coordinates: 04°36.54′S 141°57.62′E

Maps
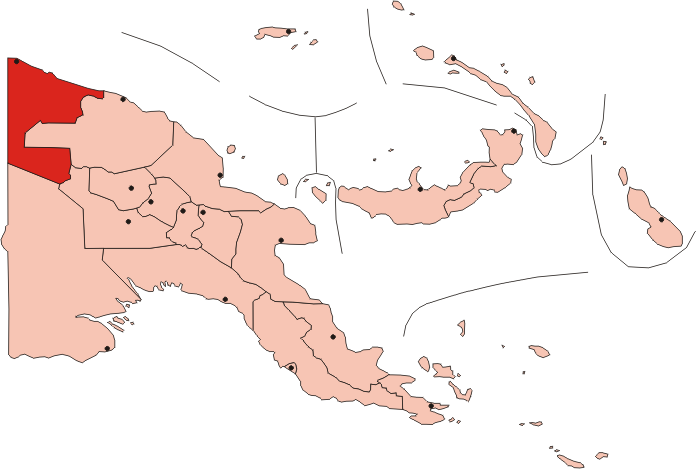
- West Sepik (Sandaun) province in PNG

- Location within Papua New Guinea

Runways
Direction	Length		Surface
Direction	m	ft	Surface
03/21	640	2,100
- Source: PNG Airstrip Guide

Frieda River Airport (IATA: FAQ, ICAO: AYFR) is an airfield serving the Frieda River area in Papua New Guinea. It is located near the border between the provinces of West Sepik (Sandaun) and East Sepik. The area has a gold and copper mine known as the Frieda River Project. The airfield is located 428 nautical miles (793 km; 493 mi) northwest of Port Moresby, the capital and largest city of Papua New Guinea.

== Facilities ==
The airfield resides at an elevation of 200 feet (61 m) above mean sea level. It has one runway designated 03/21 which is 640 metres (2,100 ft) long.
