= Rachel Jewkes =

South African scientist

- Citizenship: South Africa
- Occupations: scientist, researcher
- Organization: What Works to Prevent Violence Global Programme
- Notable work: A UN-sponsored study coauthored by Jewkes on male violence against women in Asia

Rachel Jewkes is executive scientist: research strategy in Office of the President and former unit director of the Gender and Health Unit of the South Africa Medical Research Council, based in Pretoria, South Africa. She also serves as Director of the What Works to Prevent Violence Global Programme, as well as of the Secretary of the Sexual Violence Research Initiative. She has been a member of the National Council Against Gender-Based Violence in South Africa and the PEPFAR Scientific Advisory Board and the WHO's Strategic and Technical Advisory Committee for HIV-AIDS (STAC-HIV). Jewkes studied medicine, receiving a master's in community medicine (MSc) and a doctorate in medicine (MD) from the London School of Hygiene & Tropical Medicine, University of London. She is an honorary professor in the faculty of Health Sciences, School of Public Health at the University of Witwatersrand, Johannesburg, and is an A-rated researcher with the South African National Research Foundation. Jewkes moved from England to South Africa in 1994.

== Recent research ==
A UN-sponsored study coauthored by Jewkes on male violence against women in Asia and the Pacific reported that a high number of men admitted to sexual violence. Survey researchers have questioned the plausibility of some of the findings of this study. In 2013 Jewkes also published on depressive symptoms after sexual assault, the epidemiology of child homicides and intimate femicide-suicide.

== Publications ==
=== Sexual violence ===
- Fulu, Emma; Warner, Xian; Miedema, Stephanie; Jewkes, Rachel; Roselli, Tim; Lang, James (2013). Why Do Some Men Use Violence Against Women and How Can We Prevent It? Quantitative Findings from the United Nations Multi-country Study on Men and Violence in Asia and the Pacific. Bangkok: UNDP, UNFPA, UN Women and UNV. ISBN 978-974-680-360-1.
- Jewkes, Rachel; Sen, Purna; Garcia-Moreno, Claudia (2002). "Sexual violence" (PDF). In Krug, Etienne G.; Dahlberg, Linda L.; Mercy, James A.; Zwi, Anthony B.; Lozano, Rafael (eds.). World report on violence and health. Geneva: World Health Organization. pp. 147–82. ISBN 978-92-4-154561-7.
- Abrahams N, Jewkes R, Hoffman M, Laubsher R (May 2004). "Sexual violence against intimate partners in Cape Town: prevalence and risk factors reported by men". Bulletin of the World Health Organization. 82 (5): 330–7. PMC 2622838. PMID 15298223.
- Jewkes R, Christofides N, Vetten L, Jina R, Sigsworth R, Loots L (October 2009). "Medico-legal findings, legal case progression, and outcomes in South African rape cases: retrospective review". PLOS Medicine. 6 (10) e1000164. doi:10.1371/journal.pmed.1000164. PMC 2752115. PMID 19823567.

=== Homicide and femicide ===
- Mathews S, Abrahams N, Jewkes R, Martin LJ, Lombard C, Vetten L (July 2008). "Intimate femicide-suicide in South Africa: a cross-sectional study". Bulletin of the World Health Organization. 86 (7): 552–58. doi:10.2471/blt.07.043786. PMC 2647481. PMID 18670666.
- Abrahams N, Jewkes R, Martin LJ, Mathews S, Vetten L, Lombard C (2009). "Mortality of women from intimate partner violence in South Africa: a national epidemiological study". Violence and Victims. 24 (4): 546–56. doi:10.1891/0886-6708.24.4.546. PMID 19694357. S2CID 33535951.

=== Women's health ===
- Abrahams N, Jewkes R, Mvo Z (2001). "Health care-seeking practices of pregnant women and the role of the midwife in Cape Town, South Africa". Journal of Midwifery & Women's Health. 46 (4): 240–7. doi:10.1016/S1526-9523(01)00138-6. PMID 11603639.
- Jewkes, Rachel; Flood, Michael; Lang, James (18 April 2015). "From work with men and boys to changes of social norms and reduction of inequities in gender relations: a conceptual shift in prevention of violence against women and girls" (PDF). The Lancet. 385 (9977): 1580–1589. doi:10.1016/S0140-6736(14)61683-4. PMID 25467578. S2CID 18597874. Pdf.
