= Frieda River Project =

Mine in Papua New Guinea

Frieda River mine
- Interactive map of Frieda River mine
- Location: Sandaun and East Sepik Provinces, Papua New Guinea
- Products: Gold Copper

The Frieda River Project is a large open cast mine and associated infrastructure in the Sandaun and East Sepik Provinces of Papua New Guinea. The mine is located along a tributary of the Sepik River. The deposit is a large copper-gold porphyry deposit. The project includes a hydroelectric scheme to provide electricity. and service by the Frieda River Airport. In 2010, the mine had estimated reserves of 14.3 million oz of gold.

== Ownership ==
The project was originally majority owned by Xstrata. It is now owned 80% by Chinese state-owned PanAust Ltd after it was bought from Glencore/Xstrata in 2013, and 20% by Australian Stock Exchange-listed Highlands Pacific.

PanAust is "an Australian incorporated company" owned by Guangdong Rising H.K. Limited, "a wholly owned subsidiary of Guangdong Rising Assets Management Co. Ltd" which is "a Chinese state-owned company" in Guangdong Province, China.

Feasibility studies were underway in 2010 and completed on 19 May 2016, and were reportedly on track at that time for submission to the Government of Papua New Guinea.

== Environmental impact ==
The planned mine would cover 16,000 hectares of land that is currently forest, comprising an open pit mine, a tailings dam, a hydroelectric dam and other infrastructure including roads and an airport.

There is enormous concern in Papua New Guinea and elsewhere about the potential for environmental damage to the Sepik River from the mine.

The mine is located in a seismically active area, and the tailings dam for the mine would eventually hold 1.5 billion tonnes of mine waste.

The environmental impact statement for the mine notes that "the extreme consequences of complete failure [of the tailings dam] leading to the uncontrolled release of large quantities of water and solids (from waste rock and tailings placement) would likely result in extreme downstream environmental and social impacts.”

== See also ==
- Mining in Papua New Guinea
- Xstrata
