= Wapenamanda District =

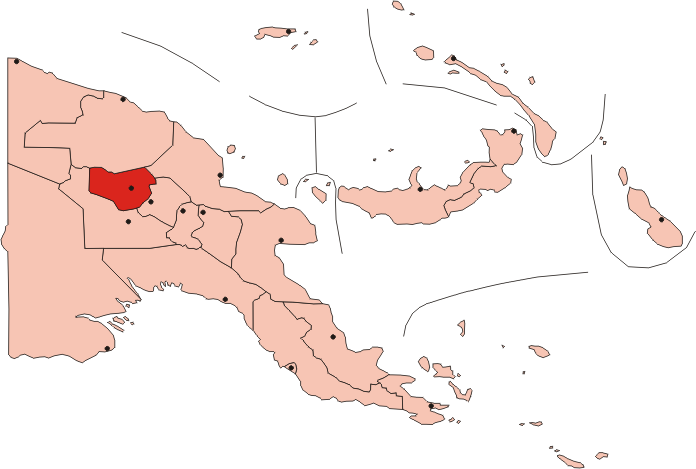
- Location of Enga Province

- Location within Papua New Guinea
- Coordinates: 05°38′36″S 143°53′43″E
- Country: Papua New Guinea
- Province: Enga Province
- Capital: Wapenamanda

Area
  - Total: 1,042 km^{2} (402 sq mi)

Population (2011 census)
  - Total: 71,797
  - Density: 68.90/km^{2} (178.5/sq mi)
- Time zone: UTC+10 (AEST)

Wapenamanda District is a district in Enga Province of Papua New Guinea. Its capital is Wapenamanda. The population of the district was 71,797 at the 2011 census. Wapenamanda Airport, the only airport in Enga Province is located in Wapenamanda Town. Air Niugini, OTML charter Dash 28, HaviLift, PNG Air and other private permitted air service flights daily services to Enga Province.

There are four secondary schools in the district which are St Paul's Lutheran Secondary School, Highlands Lutheran International School, Wapenamanda Foursquare Secondary and the newly created Pitipas RMCN secondary School.

Wapenamanda is considered one of the province's food baskets. The landscape includes plateaus, valleys, gorges and ravines. The lower Lai basin is a fertile valley towards the Sepik river. To the south of those gorges lie the Minamb valley.

Wapenamanda is divided into two Local Level Governments – Wapenamanda Rural and Tsak LLG. Tsak is more populous. The road network is being slowly improved. Power is slowly being connected, starting with Tsak. The road to Tsak has been sealed. Lowerlai, with a population of about 11,000 people, has not benefited from the power projects. The road network into lower is also attended to on a piecemeal basis. Digicel mobile communication towers cover 60% of the district. Constituents who reside in lower-lying areas suffer from low bandwidth and network connectivity problems.

Wapenamanda has one hospital, the Mambisanda Immanuel Hospital run by the Good News Lutheran Church. Law and order is maintained by and self-balancing local leadership structure.
