= Maramuni Rural LLG =

Local-level government in Papua New Guinea

- Location within Papua New Guinea
- Coordinates: 5.13674°S 143.488535°E
- Country: Papua New Guinea
- Province: Enga Province
- Time zone: UTC+10 (AEST)

Maramuni Rural LLG is a local-level government (LLG) of Enga Province, Papua New Guinea.

== Wards ==
- 01. Biak
- 02. Net Nai
- 03. Pasalaugus
- 04. Wailep
- 05. Tongori
- 06. Kaematok
- 07. Wangalongen
- 08. Neliyakou
- 09. Ilya
- 10. Poreak
- 11. Warakom
- 12. Pokale
- 13. Penale
