= Hewa Rural LLG =

Local-level government in Papua New Guinea

- Location within Papua New Guinea
- Coordinates: 5.2000°S 143.4000°E
- Country: Papua New Guinea
- Province: Enga Province
- District: Kompiam-Ambum District
- Time zone: UTC+10 (AEST)

Hewa Rural LLG is a local-level government (LLG) of Enga Province, Papua New Guinea.

== Wards ==
- 01. Hewaga
- 02. Piyawi
- 03. Yawirima
- 04. Puyolipa
- 05. Pipiya
- 06. Yupiyopa
- 07. Kepiyomana
- 08. Yamilipa
- 09. Hikopilipa
- 10. Yupila
- 11. Kalipana
- 12. Lapilika
- 13. Anikopaka
- 14. Wakilopa
- 15. Yankipi
- 16. Pupiyama
