= Paela Rural LLG =

Local-level government in Papua New Guinea

Paiela Rural LLG
- Location within Papua New Guinea
- Coordinates: 5.4835°S 143.1200°E
- Country: Papua New Guinea
- Province: Enga Province
- District: Porgera-Paela District
- Time zone: UTC+10 (AEST)

Paiela Rural LLG is a local-level government (LLG) of Enga Province, Papua New Guinea.

== Wards ==
- 01. Tomba
- 02. Kanak
- 03. Kepilam
- 04. Yokona
- 05. Maramuni
- 06. Alipis
- 07. Yoponda
- 08. Yalaki
- 09. Lukanda
- 10. Ipanda
- 11. Piyan
- 12. Lapoko
- 13. Tukumanda
- 14. Wik
- 15. Tapos
- 16. Kamap
- 17. Anapanda
- 18. Pawala
