= Misima mine =

- Location: Milne Bay Province, Papua New Guinea
- Products: Gold

The Misima mine was a mid-sized gold mine in Papua New Guinea that was operated from 1989 to 2004 by Placer Dome. The mine is located in the south-east of the country in Milne Bay Province. One estimate of the remaining resource is 5 million oz of gold.
