= Wapenamanda Rural LLG =

Local-level government in Papua New Guinea

- Location within Papua New Guinea
- Coordinates: 5.632376°S 143.888049°E
- Country: Papua New Guinea
- Province: Enga Province
- Time zone: UTC+10 (AEST)

Wapenamanda Rural LLG is a local-level government (LLG) of Enga Province, Papua New Guinea.

== Wards ==
- 01. Awas
- 02. Tubiakores
- 03. Aipanda
- 04. Kaiamanda
- 05. Tombes
- 06. Yalis
- 07. Yuk
- 08. Alumbalam
- 09. Elyaganda
- 10. Takaipos
- 11. Mambisanda
- 12. Kumbas Kau
- 13. Wares
- 15. Rauanda
- 16. Pina
- 17. Yaibos
- 18. Topakapos
- 19. Paus
- 20. Kuimamanda
- 21. Kangarapos
- 22. Pompabus
- 23. Kanamanda
- 24. Mondop
- 25. Pausa
- 26. Kumbu
- 27. Yaramanda
- 28. Tapend
- 29. Yakaendis
- 30. Unda
- 31. Anji
- 32. Nanai
- 33. Walya
- 34. Ipia
- 82. Wapenamanda Urban
