= Maip Muritaka Rural LLG =

Local-level government in Papua New Guinea

Maip Mulitaka Rural LLG
- Location within Papua New Guinea
- Coordinates: 5.247°S 143.242°E
- Country: Papua New Guinea
- Province: Enga Province
- Time zone: UTC+10 (PGT)

Maip Muritaka Rural LLG is a local-level government of Enga Province, Papua New Guinea.

In the news coverage of the 2024 Enga landslide affecting Yambali and Kaokalam villages, it was generally referred to as "Mulitaka".

== Wards ==
- 01. Tumudane
- 02. Walya
- 03. Yeim
- 04. Yalum
- 05. Tombaip
- 06. Rumbapes
- 07. Yambali
- 08. Mulitaka
- 09. Torenam
- 10. Malaumanda
- 11. Lauk
- 12. Tokom (Winjak)
- 13. Lemong/Poreak
- 14. Kaundak
- 15. Pokolip
- 16. Yuyango
- 17. Puaipak
- 18. Paitengis
- 19. Ipalopa

== See also ==
- 2024 Enga landslide
