= Porgera Gold Mine =

Mine in Enga Province, Papua New Guinea

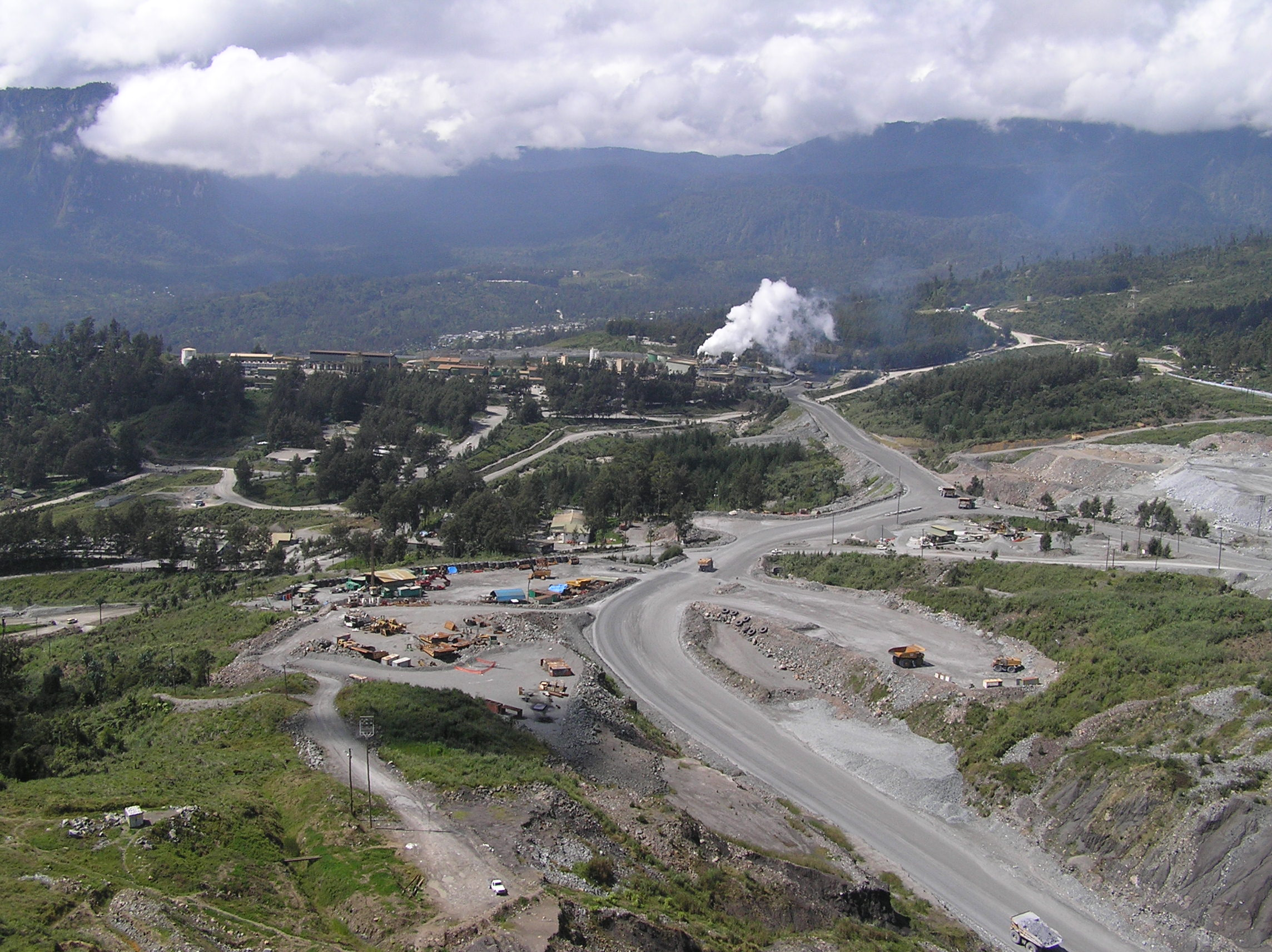
- Looking out across the lower half of the Porgera processing plant, and down into the Porgera valley

- Location in Papua New Guinea
- Location: Enga, Papua New Guinea; 5°27′53″S 143°06′17″E
- Products: Gold, Silver
- Production: 572,600 ounces gold, 94,764 ounces silver
- Financial year: 2009
- Opened: 1990
- Company: Porgera Joint Venture (PJV): 95% Barrick Gold, 5% Mineral Resources Enga (MRE)
- Website: Barrick Gold Corp Website

The Porgera Gold Mine is a large gold and silver mining operation near Porgera, Enga province, Papua New Guinea (PNG). Located at the head of the Porgera Valley, The mine is situated in the rain forest covered highlands at an altitude of 2,200 to 2,700 m, in a region of high rainfall, landslides, and frequent earthquakes.

The Porgera Gold Mine closed in April 2020, following the end of its special mining lease. Extensive negotiations for a new special mining lease were concluded in 2023 and the reopening of the mine was announced in December 2023, with first production expected in the first quarter of 2024.

The new special mining lease was finally issued to New Porgera Limited, an entity 51% owned by PNG stakeholders (including state-owned Kumul Minerals Holdings Limited, local landowners and the Enga provincial government), and 49% by Barrick Niugini Limited (BNL), itself a joint venture between Barrick Gold and Zijin Mining of China.

Porgera Gold Mine is the second largest mine in Papua New Guinea and is regarded as one of the world's top ten producing gold mines. In 2009, it produced 572,595 ounces of gold and 94,764 ounces of silver and had 2,500 employees and 500 contractors. Since it began operating, the mine has produced more than 16 million ounces of gold and almost 3 million ounces of silver, accounting for about 12 percent of Papua New Guinea's total exports. The mine's proven and probable mineral reserves as of 2009 amount to 8.1 million ounces of gold.

Porgera Gold Mine has consistently been criticized for environmental and human rights issues. Its internal investigations have revealed that killings, brutal gang rapes, and beatings have been carried out by mine security personnel.

== Ownership history ==
Its exploration and development was under Placer, then it began production in 1990 and was developed and operated by Placer Dome,(a merger between Placer and Dome) which was acquired in 2006 by Barrick Gold, the world's largest gold mining company at that time. Emperor Gold Mine, holding a minority stake of 20%, was sold to Barrick in April 2007. This gave Barrick (Niugini) a 95% ownership of the operation. The remaining 5% is owned by Mineral Resources Enga (MRE), which the Enga Provincial Government owns, the Papua New Guinea National Government, and the Porgera Landowners Association. Barrick Gold Corporation and Zijin Mining Group each own 50% of Barrick (Niugini) Ltd.

In 2020 the Papua New Guinea government decided not to renew Barrick Gold's lease on the mine, prompting Barrick to sue the government within Papua New Guinea and at an international tribunal. The government backed down after negotiating a greater ownership stake in the joint venture.

== Production ==
Porgera Gold Mine began operation in 1990. Originally an underground operation, open-pit mining became increasingly important after 1993, temporarily putting an end to underground mining in 1997. Starting in 2002, the mine utilised both open-pit and underground mining methods for ore extraction. The site of the last open pit to be excavated was Mt Waruwari.

When operating, the open pit mine could move up to 160,000 tonnes of rock material and gold-bearing ore daily, and the underground mine over 2,000 tonnes. Ore was processed in a mainly conventional plant, utilising several SAG and Ball mills, four Autoclaves, floatation cells and CIP / CIL. Gravity recovery was also used, with Knelson concentrators used for primary recovery, and an Acacia Reactor treating the concentrate. A large fleet of Cat 777 and Cat 789 trucks were used on the surface, fed by O&K shovels, and smaller excavators and loaders. A collection of underground development and production drilling equipment was used to break ground, which was bogged by Elphinstone RH series LHD's into a fleet of Elphinstone AD45 trucks.

== Management and employees ==
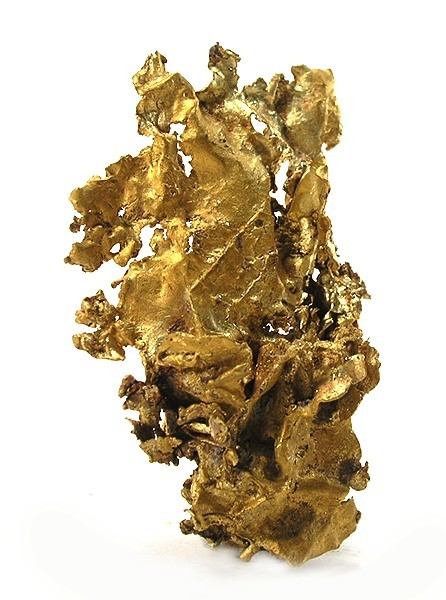
Piece of gold of unusual size and quality from Porgera mine, 4.7 x 2.8 x 1.6 cm

The management approach to community relations changed when Barrick Gold took ownership from Placer Dome, which was quickly followed by the termination of the community relations staff that Placer Dome has employed. The new approach to community relations was described as "more vicious" and "more cruel" by journalist Richard Poplak the Canadaland podcast in 2022.

Although the mine is nominally a joint venture, it is managed by Barrick Gold personnel, who are employed on a fly in fly out basis. None of the management team lives in the Porgera region, and all are accommodated in the mine's camp facilities.

The mine has an extensive training and education program, offering diverse traineeships and apprenticeships to locals. This has resulted in many people gaining the necessary skills for employment at the Porgera mine and other mining operations in Papua New Guinea and other countries.

In 2009, out of 2,427 employees at the mine, 93.49% were PNG nationals, 1,606 were Porgerans, 33 other Engans, 630 other PNG nationals, and 158 were expatriates.

== Production ==
The mine was originally one of the world's major low-cost gold producers, but operating costs have increased. In 2004 it produced over one million ounces of gold at a cash cost of US$192 per ounce. Its output fell to about 865,000 ounces in 2005, and has reached 572,595 ounces of gold at cash costs of US$515 per ounce in 2009. With its 2,500 employees and 500 contractors it is one of the largest gold mines in Papua New Guinea and Australasia, and is widely regarded as one of the world's top ten producing gold mines.

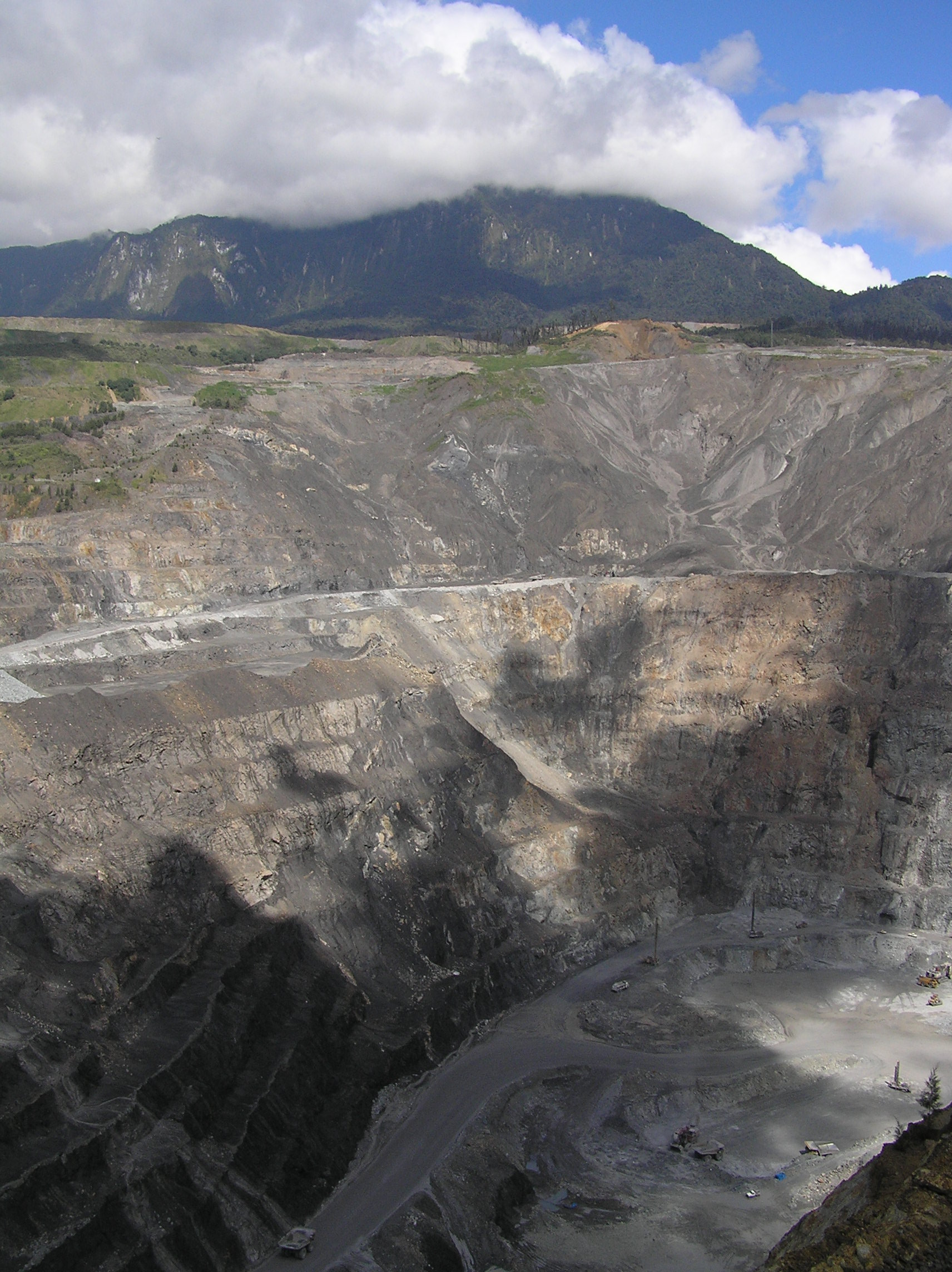
Looking down into the Porgera open pit

Production of the mine
Year	Gold	Silver	Year	Gold	Silver
1990	265,890 ounces	224,227 ounces	2000	910,434 ounces	110,276 ounces
1991	1,216,101 ounces	593,312 ounces	2001	760,622 ounces	113,043 ounces
1992	1,485,077 ounces	139,619 ounces	2002	641,811 ounces	126,772 ounces
1993	1,156,670 ounces	129,860 ounces	2003	851,920 ounces	164,691 ounces
1994	1,032,768 ounces	133,890 ounces	2004	1,019,746 ounces	185,336 ounces
1995	848,870 ounces	90,770 ounces	2005	867,925 ounces	157,740 ounces
1996	854,822 ounces	106,535 ounces	2006	523,358 ounces	104,238 ounces
1997	712,693 ounces	100,479 ounces	2007	513,177 ounces	79,561 ounces
1998	726,806 ounces	91,614 ounces	2008	632,603 ounces	90,610 ounces
1999	754,754 ounces	100,694 ounces	2009	572,595 ounces	94,764 ounces
Total 1990–2009				16,348,642 ounces	2,938,031 ounces

== Impact ==
The mine has had a large impact on its immediate local area. Modern health care and education services have been brought to the valley by the mine, and some members of the community have profited from the mine's presence. However, alcoholism, lawlessness and illegal mining have all increased.

In 2022, Canadaland featured journalist Richard Poplak who criticized the mine for providing buildings but not maintenance or staff, analyzing that the modest investment in the local community would not last; Poplak described the community investment as "ghost whok". The town of Porgera was described as "hell" and a "dump ground". Catherine Coumans of MiningWatch Canada spoke about how mountains of dumped tailings blocked passage between communities and polluted rivers.

== Controversies ==
=== Civil unrest (April–May 2007) ===
On 23 April 2007, local landowner groups protesting over proposed relocation settlements were successful in peacefully halting mining and processing operations at the mine. The suspension lasted for ten days, during which various local landowner clans, PNG government representatives, and PJV mine management eventually agreed on how best to move on.

=== Human rights issues ===
The mine employs its security force, numbering between 400 and 500 persons. Some sections of the security forces are licensed to utilize lethal force. Police and security guards have killed eight people (the company's figures) to 14 people (according to a community association) over the past ten years and injured many more. In 2009 rising insecurity around the mine led the government of Papua New Guinea to deploy several squads of mobile policemen to Porgera. According to Amnesty International, the deployment resulted in the eviction of nearby villagers and the burning of their houses.

Human Rights Watch investigated and documented reports of abuse, including brutal gang rapes and beatings, carried out by security personnel at the mine. After having denied previous claims of crimes committed at the mine, Barrick Gold launched an internal investigation which confirmed the findings.

In 2022 Canadaland reported hundreds of rapes undertaken by employed security contractors, and starting in 2003 or 2004 a policy of using sexual violence as a means to deter people from salvaging for gold on and around the mine. Canadaland quoted Akali Tange's 2005 report The Shooting Fields of Porgera Joint Venture which documents allegations of murder of local residents by mine security contractors.

After acknowledging the history of sexual violence perpetrated by guards at the mine in 2010, Barrick Gold set up a compensation scheme and paid 119 survivors of sexual violence approximately CAD$8,000 per person on the condition that they agreed not to sue Barrick Gold.

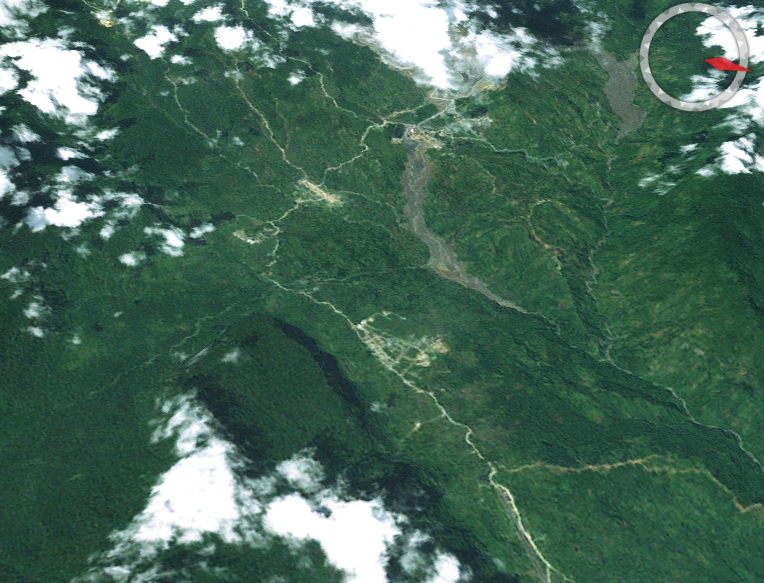
NASA Landsat image of Porgera mine

=== Environmental issues ===
The mine has, for many years, been severely contaminating the Porgera River, adjacent rivers, and the Gulf of Papua. The mine practises riverine tailings disposal, by which processed ore is dumped directly into the local river. This increases sediment loading by approximately 8 million tonnes per year. Additionally, the mine has two 'Erodible Dumps' – areas where soft waste rock are dumped, and the high amount of local rainfall gradually washes into the local rivers. The increase in sediment loading is hard to quantify but is generally thought to be in the range of 4 to 6 million tonnes per year. The river systems eventually deliver hundreds of millions of tonnes of sediment into the Gulf of Papua.

The main concern with riverine tailings disposal as practiced by the PJV is not the quantities of sediment, but the toxicity of the tailings, which contains significant quantities of cyanide, mercury and other heavy elements. The mercury is 'fixed' in a compound state by which it is thought will not ultimately enter the food chain, but no conclusive research has been performed. However, the mine has been certified as fully compliant with the International Cyanide Management Code.

The mine also has three vast dumps of waste rock—stone with quantities of gold ore too low to be processed economically.

In January 2009, Norway's finance ministry announced that the Government Pension Fund of Norway excluded Barrick Gold from its investments due to the “severe environmental damage” caused by the Porgera Gold Mine, stating that “the company’s riverine disposal practice is in breach of international norms [and] the company’s assertions that its operations do not cause long-term and irreversible environmental damage carry little credibility [and that there is] reason to believe that the company’s unacceptable practice will continue in the future.”

=== Local politics ===
The local body, which was established to represent the landowners around the mine, the Porgera Landowners Association (PLOA), is funded by a percentage of royalties from the mine, receiving $1.4 million in 2009. However, the PLOA refuses to publish its accounts, and many landowners accuse the leadership of the PLOA of lining their own pockets at the expense of ordinary landowners. As a result, the mine negotiates with individual landowners direct rather than through the PLOA as intended.

== Accidents ==
- In August 1994, eleven workers were killed when a blast destroyed the Dyno Wesfarmers explosives factory at the Porgera Gold Mine. The explosion left a crater 40 meters wide and 15 meters deep, damaging property up to 2 kilometers away. The cause of the accident was never determined.
- On 3 March 2012, five people were killed and at least one person was injured in a routine blast at the mine. Police said the victims had entered the mine illegally to search for gold. The three survivors were arrested and charged with trespassing.

== See also ==
- Ok Tedi environmental disaster
