= Papua New Guinea Red Cross Society =

Organization

- Abbreviation: PNGRCS
- Founded: 1977
- Type: Non-profit organisation
- Purpose: Humanitarian Aid
- Location: Papua New Guinea
- Affiliations: International Committee of the Red Cross; International Federation of Red Cross and Red Crescent Societies

The Papua New Guinea Red Cross Society, also known as PNGRCS, was founded in 1977 and has its headquarters in Port Moresby, Papua New Guinea.
