= Placer Dome =

Canadian mining company (1987–2006)

Placer Dome Inc.
- Industry: Mining
- Predecessor: Placer Development; Dome Mines
- Founded: 13 August 1987
- Defunct: 3 May 2006
- Fate: Acquired by Barrick Gold
- Headquarters: Vancouver, British Columbia
- Key people: Peter W. Tomsett (President, CEO); Robert M. Franklin (Chairman)
- Products: Gold; Copper
- Number of employees: 13,000 (2005)

Placer Dome Inc. was a large mining company specializing in gold and other precious metals, with corporate headquarters in Vancouver, British Columbia, Canada.

In August 2005, the company had interests in 16 gold mining operations in 7 countries; it had a market capitalization of $6.7 billion USD (on June 30, 2005). For the year 2004, it had sales of $1,888 million, net earnings of $284 million, and cash from operations of US$376 million.

The company was purchased by Barrick Gold in 2006, and was assimilated into Barrick.

== History ==
Placer Dome was formed in Vancouver in 1987, by amalgamating Placer Development Ltd. of Vancouver (founded in British Columbia in 1926), Dome Mines Limited of Toronto (founded in Ontario in 1910, to build the original Dome Mine), and Campbell Red Lake Mines Ltd. of Toronto (founded in Ontario in 1944).

Placer Dome was heavily invested in mines in South Africa prior to the end of apartheid. Sensing that their ability to continue owning mines in post-apartheid South Africa would diminish, they started investing in Australia and Papua New Guinea, and briefly became Australia's biggest landlord.

Placer Dome operated the Detour Lake gold mine before selling the property in 1988 while it was being decommissioned. Placer Dome acquired several mining companies over its lifetime: Kiena Gold Mines Ltd. in 1988 (0.92 shares of Placer Dome Inc. for each share of Kiena Gold Mines Ltd.), Sigma Gold Mines Ltd. in 1988 (0.97 shares of Placer Dome Inc. for each share of Sigma Gold Mines Ltd.), Placer Pacific Ltd. in 1997 (0.066 shares of Placer Dome Inc. for each share of Placer Pacific Ltd. held), Getchell Gold Corporation in 1999 (2.45 shares of Placer Dome Inc. for each common share of Getchell Gold Corporation held), AurionGold Ltd. in 2003 (17.5 shares of Placer Dome Inc. for every 100 AurionGold shares, plus US$0.28 per AurionGold share), and East African Gold Mines Ltd. in 2003 ($252.4 million in cash).

In 2002 the first 3.6 tonne, 17 kW, hydrogen-powered hydrail mining locomotive for Placer Dome was demonstrated in Val-d'Or, Quebec.

== Reputation ==
Placer Dome was generally perceived as more progressive than its competitors in terms of community engagement and environmental concerns, although its rushed context analysis and community engagement in the set up of Porgera Gold Mine resulted in misunderstandings and community tension that led to "war" between the local population and Placer Dome, and also later Barrick Gold, once they bought Placer Dome.

== Operations ==
In August 2005 Placer Dome had interests in 16 mining operations in seven countries: Campbell, Musselwhite, and Porcupine in Canada; Golden Sunlight, Turquoise Ridge, Cortez, and Bald Mountain in the United States; Zaldívar and La Coipa in Chile; North Mara in Tanzania; South Deep in South Africa; Porgera in Papua New Guinea; and Osborne, Henty, Kalgoorlie, and Granny Smith in Australia.

In New South Wales Australia, Placer Dome obtained ownership of the defunct Timbarra Gold Mine, where it achieved some local acclaim for setting new, higher State standards for mining rehabilitation.

In Papua New Guinea, at the Porgera Gold Mine, Placer Dome severely contaminated the Porgera river, surrounding rivers and the gulf of Papua. In 2005, Akali Tange Association published their report The Shooting Fields of Porgera Joint Venture which documents allegations of murder of local residents by mine security contractors.

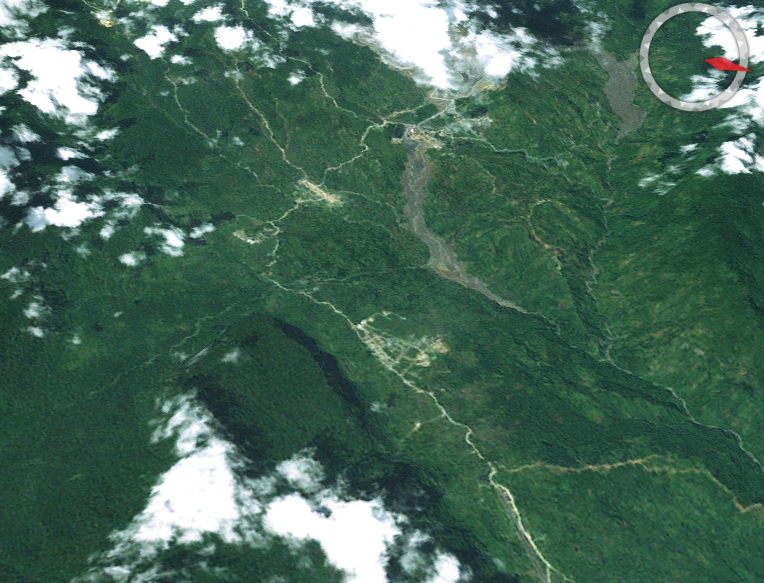

== Controversy ==
Placer Dome (and now Barrick Gold) are defendants in an ongoing court battle over the highly controversial Marcopper mining disaster, which took place at the Marcopper Mine (run by Marcopper, a Placer Dome subsidiary) on the island of Marinduque, Philippines.

== Takeover ==
Barrick Gold acquired 100% of Placer Dome shares on January 20, 2006, and integrated the company into its own. Once Barrick gained over 90% of the company shares it could force people to sell their shares to gain the 100% which it required. March 8, 2006 was the final day for trading of Placer Dome's common shares on the Toronto Stock Exchange and the New York Stock Exchange.
