= Lagaip Rural LLG =

Local-level government in Papua New Guinea

- Location within Papua New Guinea
- Coordinates: 5.495148°S 143.48861°E
- Country: Papua New Guinea
- Province: Enga Province
- Time zone: UTC+10 (AEST)

Lagaip Rural LLG is a local-level government (LLG) of Enga Province, Papua New Guinea.

== Wards ==
- 01. Mamale
- 02. Wapele
- 03. Kembos
- 04. Komaip
- 05. Wanepos
- 06. Takuup
- 07. Kasap
- 08. Yangiyangi
- 09. Kindarep
- 10. Yakenda
- 11. Keriapaka
- 12. Aiyak (Aiyaka)
- 13. Ipai
- 14. Lyonge
- 15. Paip
- 16. Liop
- 17. Yaki Due
- 18. Sirunki
- 19. Yailingis
- 20. Kaipare
- 21. Pore
- 22. Tukusenda (Tukisenta)
- 23. Nagulama
- 24. Yomondi
- 25. Kusi
- 26. Paindako
- 27. Kulita
- 28. Watali
- 29. Pipingus
- 30. Kuimas
- 81. Laiagam Urban
