= Porgera Rural LLG =

Local-level government in Papua New Guinea

- Location within Papua New Guinea
- Coordinates: 5.482337°S 143.122476°E
- Country: Papua New Guinea
- Province: Enga Province
- Time zone: UTC+10 (AEST)

Porgera Rural LLG is a local-level government (LLG) of Enga Province, Papua New Guinea.

== Wards ==
- 01. Anawe
- 02. Mugulep
- 03. Apalaka
- 04. Yuyan
- 05. Politika
- 06. Paiyam
- 07. Palipaka
- 08. Kairik
- 09. Tipinini
- 11. Yomodaka
- 12. Yanjakali
- 13. Nekeyanga
- 14. Yaparep
- 15. Yarik
- 16. Pandami (Kairik)
- 18. Taipoko
- 83. Porgera Urban

- Yanjakali - Suyan

- 84. Paiam Town

-Paiam - Lukale -kairik one
