= Wabag =

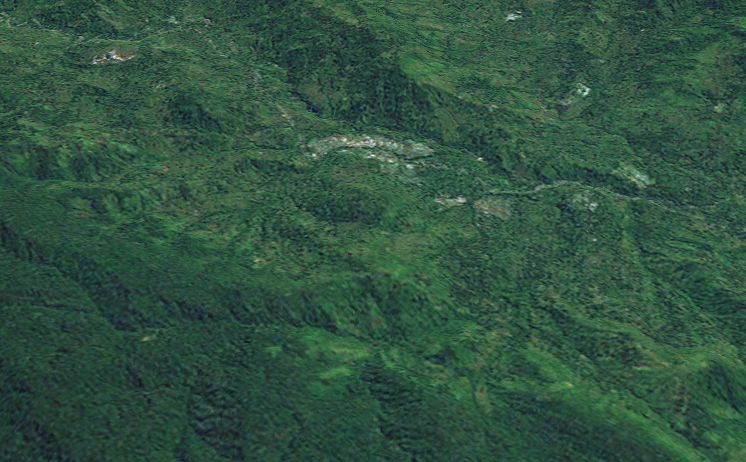
- Wabag from space

- Location within Papua New Guinea
- Coordinates: 05°29′31″S 143°43′18″E
- Country: Papua New Guinea
- Province: Enga Province
- District: Wabag District
- LLG: Wabag Urban LLG
- Elevation: 2,000 m (6,600 ft)
- Highest elevation: 2,135 m (7,005 ft)

Population (2000)
  - Total: 4,072

Languages
  - Main languages: Enga, Tok Pisin
  - Traditional language: Enga
- Time zone: UTC+10 (AEST)

Wabag is the capital of Enga Province, Papua New Guinea. It is the least populous provincial capital in the country. It is on the Lai River; the Highlands Highway passes through the town, between Mount Hagen and Porgera. Europeans first visited the site in 1938-39. A radio camp and airstrip were established in 1938-39 but restrictions on transportation and the surrounding land's infertility long inhibited Wabag's development.

It is administered under Wabag Urban LLG.

== History ==
A regional outpost of the Western Highlands District under the Australian Administration of Papua and New Guinea, shortly before Independence in 1975 much of the Enga-speaking region of the Western Highlands was separated into a discrete District and then, at Independence, Province with Wabag as the Provincial Headquarters.

== Wabag today ==
There is a dense rural population and coffee and pyrethrum are widely grown in food gardens as cash crops though depredations during tribal fights and difficulties in marketing have inhibited the development of a significant commercial agriculture sector and in any case it is Mount Hagen, not Wabag, that is the commercial metropole. Law and order problems, considerable violent crime and chronic house break-ins have continued to compromise the amenity of town life. A fine public library established by the Australian administration immediately before Independence in 1975 is long since dispersed, book pages being desirable for rolling cigarettes and reading books not having taken hold. The Enga Provincial Government buildings have been burned to the ground more than once. The original airstrip (IATA: WAB) is closed but Air Niugini runs regular flights to Port Moresby from Wapenamanda Airport about 40 minutes away by road.

== Climate ==
Under the Köppen climate classification Wabag has a wet subtropical highland climate (Cfb). Temperatures are very consistent year round, with warm days and cool nights. Precipitation is very heavy year round in the form of rain, with June and July being the driest months.

Climate data for Wabag, Papua New Guinea (1953–1967)
Month	Jan	Feb	Mar	Apr	May	Jun	Jul	Aug	Sep	Oct	Nov	Dec	Year
Mean daily maximum °C (°F)	22.7 (72.9)	22.7 (72.9)	22.7 (72.9)	22.5 (72.5)	22.7 (72.9)	22.6 (72.7)	21.9 (71.4)	21.8 (71.2)	22.3 (72.1)	22.5 (72.5)	22.8 (73.0)	22.3 (72.1)	22.5 (72.4)
Daily mean °C (°F)	17.1 (62.8)	17.3 (63.1)	17.3 (63.1)	17.1 (62.8)	17.0 (62.6)	16.5 (61.7)	16.0 (60.8)	16.3 (61.3)	16.5 (61.7)	16.5 (61.7)	16.7 (62.1)	16.9 (62.4)	16.8 (62.2)
Mean daily minimum °C (°F)	11.6 (52.9)	11.9 (53.4)	12.0 (53.6)	11.7 (53.1)	11.3 (52.3)	10.4 (50.7)	10.1 (50.2)	10.7 (51.3)	10.6 (51.1)	10.5 (50.9)	10.5 (50.9)	11.6 (52.9)	11.1 (51.9)
Average rainfall mm (inches)	287.9 (11.33)	296.3 (11.67)	353.2 (13.91)	291.0 (11.46)	184.5 (7.26)	138.9 (5.47)	123.6 (4.87)	192.3 (7.57)	264.9 (10.43)	265.9 (10.47)	262.3 (10.33)	307.3 (12.10)	2,968 (116.85)
Source: KNMI (rainfall 1950–1984)

== See also ==
- Wabag Urban LLG
- Wabag Rural LLG
