= Laiagam =

Coordinates: 5°17′S 143°46′E

Laiagam is situated in the west of Enga Province, Papua New Guinea. It is the main town of the newly created Lagaip District; after it was separated from the then Lagaip-Porgera District by the Papua New Guinea Parliament through an Act passed in 2021. It is still the largest and most populated district of Enga's five administrative districts.
