= Porgera =

Porgera Pogera
- Location within Papua New Guinea
- Coordinates: 05°27′42″S 143°09′01″E
- Country: Papua New Guinea
- Province: Enga Province
- District: Lagaip-Porgera District
- LLG: Porgera Rural LLG
- Time zone: UTC+10 (AEST)

Porgera (also spelled Pogera) is a town in Enga Province, Papua New Guinea. It lies to the east of Porgera Gold Mine. It is administered under Porgera Rural LLG.
