= Enga Province =

Province in Papua New Guinea

Enga Province Enga Provins (Tok Pisin) Enga
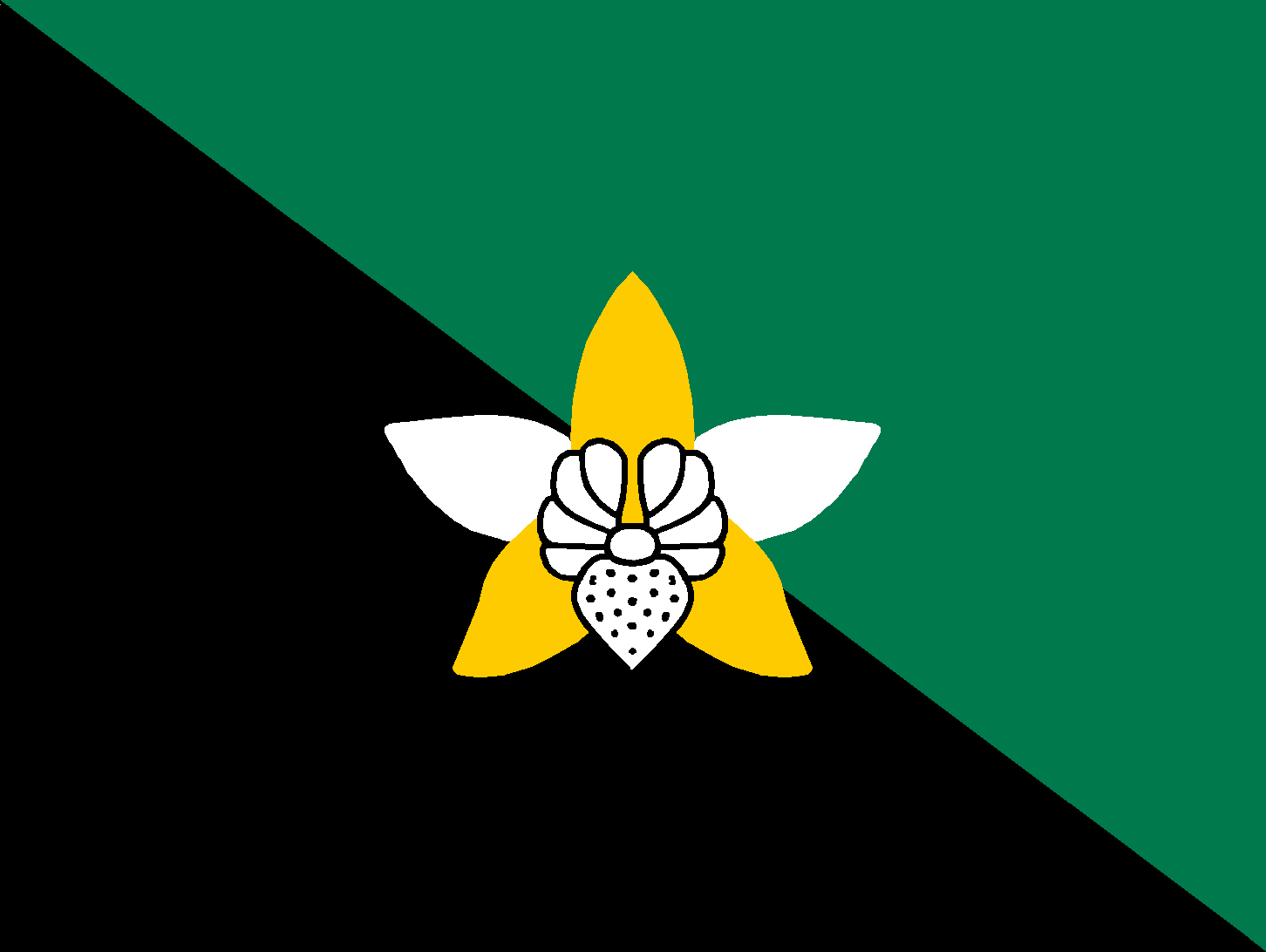
- Flag

- Enga Province in Papua New Guinea
- Coordinates: 5°30′S 143°30′E
- Country: Papua New Guinea
- Capital: Wabag
- Districts: List: Kandep District; Kompiam-Ambum District; Lagaip District; Porgera-Paela District; Wabag District; Wapenamanda District

Government
  - Governor: Peter Ipatas (1997–present)

Area
  - Total: 11,704 km^{2} (4,519 sq mi)

Population (2021 census)
  - Total: 571,060
  - Density: 48.792/km^{2} (126.37/sq mi)
- Time zone: UTC+10 (AEST)
- ISO 3166 code: PG-EPW
- HDI (2018): 0.480 low · 20th of 22

Map of Enga Province

Enga is one of the provinces in Papua New Guinea (PNG). Enga is geographically situated in the northern region of Papua New Guinea and was separated from the adjacent Western Highlands at the time of national independence in 1975. The majority ethnic group are Engans. Approximately 500,000 people live within the province, which has one spoken language in all five of its districts. A small minority of Engans' land on the eastern side of the region remained in the Western Highlands, their territory being accessible by road from Mount Hagen but not directly from elsewhere in Enga territory.

== History ==
Europeans—typically Australian gold prospectors—originally entered what is now Enga province from the east in the late 1920s, although the best-known exploration of Enga took place during the early 1930s when Mick Leahy and a party of men travelled from what later became Mount Hagen to the site of the future Wabag and then south through the Ambum Valley to what later became East Sepik.

On 24 May 2024, a landslide occurred affecting six villages in Maip Muritaka Rural LLG. It is estimated that over 670 people died in this disaster

== Culture ==
Engans are divided into three subgroups, the Mae, the Raiapu, and the Kyaka.

Like many other highland Papua New Guineans living west of the Daulo Pass (between Chimbu Province and Eastern Highlands Province), the traditional Engan settlement style is that of scattered homesteads dispersed throughout the landscape. Historically sweet potato was the staple food, sometimes supplemented by pork. The modern diet places an increasing emphasis on store bought rice and tinned fish and meat. Pigs remain a culturally valued item with elaborate systems of pig exchange also known as "tee" that mark social life in the province. The Raiapu practice extensive agriculture in their highland region. Sweet potatoes are the major crop, forming two-thirds of the Raiapu diet. They also raise pigs.

The Raiapu Enga believe in a variety of supernatural beings, although anthropologist Richard Feachem states that the Raiapu "derive no joy or comfort from their religious beliefs" due to the pervasively indifferent or malevolent nature of those spirits. The yalyakali, or "sky people," are fair-skinned and beautiful deities whose idyllic lives in the clouds mirror the agricultural and clan structure of the Raiapu below but lack the sadness of ordinary life. They are considered remote and unapproachable by humans. Feachem states that "the remaining spirit beings (ghosts and demons) are an aggressive and bellicose group who are mercilessly engaged in an endless cycle of revenge and mischief." The yuumi nenge, or "destructive ground force," are ghosts which cause deaths from exposure in the forest. A timongo is a spirit which leaves a human body upon death and wanders the forests as "a source of continual fear and alarm for the living," particularly the still-living members of their own immediate families, against whom they bear "bitter grievances." Also living in the wild forests, as well as caves and pools, are evil, carnivorous demons known as pututuli, which can change their shape but are often seen as being extremely tall with two-fingered claws. The Raiapu believe that human babies are occasionally switched by female demons with pututuli babies. Topoli are human sorcerers who possess secret knowledge of spells or other esoteric knowledge, and can defend against and communicate with hostile spirits. They "may be described as a healer of broken limbs, or a catcher of lost ghosts," writes Feachem.

== Crime and violence ==
Tribal violence in Enga has been a way of life, although traditional weaponry, rules of engagement, and peace treaties kept casualties low. This norm has begun to change in the region in the 21st century, with greater use of firearms, mercenaries, and ignoring rules of engagement leading to greater loss of life. Firearms are believed to have been stolen from government armouries. Only a fifth of the 5000 Australian-made Self Loading Rifles and half of the 2000 M16's delivered to the Papua New Guinea Defence Force (PNGDF) from the 1970s to the 1990s were found in government armouries during an audit in 2004 and 2005. The theft and smuggling of ammunition has also led to large numbers of casualties, leading to peace treaties being more difficult to obtain. The PNGDF and the Royal Papua New Guinea Constabulary have found it difficult to keep order, as they are often short on weaponry and ammunition themselves.

Fighting emerged after the 2022 Papua New Guinean general election, with thousands being displaced from their homes. This fighting then continued with different tribes ambushing others in a myriad of disputes, leading to villages being abandoned. Many inhabitants have been displaced to the capital of Wabag in order to escape the fighting. In February 2024, 69 people were killed in a massacre in Akom, 30 minutes from the capital, the worst loss of life since the Bougainville conflict of the 1980s and 1990s. Prime Minister James Marape called it an act of domestic terrorism and stated that they would seek help from Australia to support policing and security in the region.

== Districts and LLGs ==
The province has six districts, and each district has one or more Local Level Government (LLG) areas. For census purposes, the LLG areas are subdivided into wards and those into census units.

District	District Capital	LLG Name
Kandep District	Kandep	Kandep Rural
Kandep District	Kandep	Wage Rural
Kompiam-Ambum District	Kompiam	Ambum Rural
Kompiam-Ambum District	Kompiam	Kompiam Rural
Kompiam-Ambum District	Kompiam	Wapi-Yengis Rural
Lagaip District	Laiagam	Lagaip Rural
Lagaip District	Laiagam	Maip Muritaka Rural
Lagaip District	Laiagam	Pilikambi Rural
Porgera-Paela District	Porgera	Porgera Rural
Porgera-Paela District	Porgera	Paela Rural
Porgera-Paela District	Porgera	Hewa Rural
Wapenamanda District	Wapenamanda	Wapenamanda Rural
Wapenamanda District	Wapenamanda	Tsak Rural
Wabag District	Wabag	Maramuni Rural
Wabag District	Wabag	Wabag Rural
Wabag District	Wabag	Wabag Urban

== Provincial leaders ==
The province was governed by a decentralised provincial administration, headed by a Premier, from 1978 to 1995. Following reforms taking effect that year, the national government reassumed some powers, and the role of Premier was replaced by a position of Governor, to be held by the winner of the province-wide seat in the National Parliament of Papua New Guinea.

=== Premiers (1978–1995) ===
Premier	Term
Don Kapi	1978–1980
Danley Tindiwi	1980–1984
Provincial government suspended Graham Taylor – Provincial Administrator	1984–1986
Ned Laina	1986–1990
Danley Tindiwi	1990–1993
provincial government suspended	1993–1995

=== Regional Member/Governors (1995–present) ===
Governor	Term
Anton Parao	1972–1977
Paul Paken Torato	1977–1987
Malipu Balakau	1987–1989
Jeffery Balakau	1989–1996
Peter Ipatas	1996–present

== Members of the National Parliament ==
The province and each district is represented by a Member of the National Parliament. There is one provincial electorate and each district is an open electorate.

Electorate	Member
Enga Provincial	Peter Ipatas
Kompiam-Ambum Open	John Pundari
Lagaip Open	Aimos Akem Joseph
Porgera-Paela Open	Maso Karipe (Deceased)
Wabag Open	Dr. Lino Tom
Wapenamanda Open	Miki Kaeok
Kandep Open	Don Polye
