= 2017 in Papua New Guinea =

- Decades: 1990s; 2000s; 2010s; 2020s
- See also: Other events of 2017; Timeline of Papua New Guinean history

Events in the year 2017 in Papua New Guinea.

== Incumbents ==
- Monarch: Elizabeth II
- Governor-General:
  - until 18 February: Michael Ogio (died 18 February)
  - 18 February-28 February: Theo Zurenuoc
  - starting 28 February: Bob Dadae
- Prime Minister: Peter O'Neill

=== Provincial Governors ===
- Central: Kila Haoda
- Chimbu: Noah Kool
- East New Britain: Ereman Tobaining Jr. then Nakikus Konga
- East Sepik: Michael Somare then Allan Bird
- Enga: Peter Ipatas
- Gulf: Havila Kavo then Chris Haiveta
- Hela: Francis Potape then Philip Undialu
- Jikawa: William Tongamp
- Madang: Jim Kas then Peter Yama
- Manus: Charlie Benjamin
- Milne Bay: Titus Philemon then Sir John Luke Crittin, KBE
- Morobe: Kelly Naru then Ginson Saonu
- New Ireland: Julius Chan
- Oro: Gary Juffa
- Sandaun: Amkat Mai then Tony Wouwou
- Southern Highlands: William Powl
- West New Britain: Sasindran Muthuvel
- Western: Ati Wobiro then Taboi Awe Yoto
- Western Highlands: Paias Wingti

== Events ==
- 22 January – an earthquake of 7.9 magnitude struck off Papua New Guinea.

== Deaths ==
Michael Ogio

- 18 February – Michael Ogio, politician, Governor-General (b. 1942).
- 4 March – Roger Hau'ofa, radio broadcaster and presenter (b. 1943)
- 20 March – John Giheno, politician (b. 1949)
