= 2025 in Papua New Guinea =

- Decades: 2000s; 2010s; 2020s
- See also: Other events of 2025; Timeline of Papua New Guinean history

Events in the year 2025 in Papua New Guinea.

== Incumbents ==
- Monarch – Charles III

=== National government ===
- Governor-General – Bob Dadae
- Prime Minister – James Marape

=== Provincial Governors ===
- Central: Rufina Peter
- Chimbu: Micheal Dua Bogai
- East New Britain: Michael Marum
- East Sepik: Allan Bird
- Enga: Peter Ipatas
- Gulf: Chris Haiveta
- Hela: Philip Undialu
- Jiwaka: William Tongamp
- Madang: Peter Yama
- Manus: Charlie Benjamin
- Milne Bay: Sir John Luke Crittin, KBE
- Morobe: Ginson Saonu
- New Ireland: Julius Chan (until 30 January); Sammy Missen (since 30 January)
- Oro: Gary Juffa
- Sandaun: Tony Wouwou
- Southern Highlands: William Powl
- West New Britain: Sasindran Muthuvel
- Western: Taboi Awe Yoto
- Western Highlands: Wai Rapa

== Events ==
=== February ===
- 6 February – A twin-engine aircraft operated by TropicAir undergoes a runway excursion during takeoff at Kerema Airport due to strong winds. No injuries are reported among its eight passengers and crew.

=== March ===
- 20 March – Prosecutors in Australia drop charges of assault against former petroleum minister Jimmy Maladina.
- 24 March – The government imposes a ban on Facebook as part of a "test" to limit hate speech, misinformation and pornography.

=== April ===
- 5 April – A magnitude 6.9 earthquake hits off the coast of Kimbe.
- 10 April – The government lifts a three-year moratorium on its carbon credit schemes.

=== May ===
- 16 May – A polio outbreak is declared by the World Health Organization following the discovery of two cases in Lae.

=== September ===
- 5 September – 2025 Bougainvillean general election: President Ishmael Toroama is reelected with more than 90,000 votes.

=== October ===
- 6 October –
  - Prime Minister James Marape and Australian Prime Minister Anthony Albanese sign a mutual defence agreement in Canberra.
  - Ishmael Toroama is inaugurated for a second term as president of Bougainville.
- 7 October – A magnitude 6.6 earthquake hits Morobe Province, destroying several homes in Lae.
- 19 October – Pope Leo XIV canonizes Peter To Rot, a lay worker who was killed by the Japanese during World War II for opposing polygamy, as the first Catholic saint from Papua New Guinea.
- 31 October – At least 21 people are killed in a landslide in Kukas, Enga Province.

== Holidays ==
- 1 January – New Year's Day
- 26 February – Remembrance Day of the Late First Prime Minister
- 18 April – Good Friday
- 19 April – Easter Saturday
- 21 April – Easter Monday
- 17 June – King's Birthday
- 23 July – National Remembrance Day
- 26 August – Repentance Day
- 16 September – Independence Day
- 25 December – Christmas Day
- 26 December – Boxing Day

== Deaths ==
- 10 January: Charles Lepani, 77, diplomat.
- 30 January: Julius Chan, 85, prime minister (1980–1982, 1994–1997, 1997) and Governor of New Ireland Province (since 2007).
- 13 September: Luther Wenge, 65, judge, MP (1997–2012, since 2022) and twice governor of Morobe Province.
