= 2026 in Papua New Guinea =

- Decades: 2000s; 2010s; 2020s
- See also: Other events of 2026; Timeline of Papua New Guinean history

Events in the year 2026 in Papua New Guinea.

== Incumbents ==
- Monarch – Charles III

=== National government ===
- Governor-General – Bob Dadae
- Prime Minister – James Marape

=== Provincial Governors ===
- Central: Rufina Peter
- Chimbu: Micheal Dua Bogai
- East New Britain: Michael Marum
- East Sepik: Allan Bird
- Enga: Peter Ipatas
- Gulf: Chris Haiveta
- Hela: Philip Undialu
- Jiwaka: William Tongamp
- Madang: Peter Yama
- Manus: Charlie Benjamin
- Milne Bay: Sir John Luke Crittin, KBE
- Morobe: Ginson Saonu
- New Ireland: Sammy Missen
- Oro: Gary Juffa
- Sandaun: Tony Wouwou
- Southern Highlands: William Powl
- West New Britain: Sasindran Muthuvel
- Western: Taboi Awe Yoto
- Western Highlands: Wai Rapa

== Events ==
=== April ===
- 14 April – Soldiers block several roads across Port Moresby, protesting the military's recent recruitment controversies.
- 15 April – The government tightens security at military bases and imposes movement restrictions after a group of soldiers sets up roadblocks in Port Moresby to protest alleged irregularities in army recruitment linked to former defence minister Billy Joseph, who is under investigation.
- 20 April – Politician Theonila Roka Matbob wins the 2026 Goldman Environmental Prize.

=== July ===
- 16 July – The government announces it will close Taiwan's representative office in Port Moresby as part of a move to strengthen relations with China.
- 18 July – Two passenger vessels sink en route from the Duke of York Islands to Kokopo, killing 27 of 29 passengers aboard both ships.
- 23 July – PNG and New Zealand Defence Ministers Elias Kapavore and Chris Penk sign an agreement to boost bilateral defence cooperation in Port Moresby.

=== August ===
- 10 August – The Conservation Environment and Protection Authority (CEPA), a government organization dedicated to sustainability and conservation of nature, begins developing Papua New Guinea's National Chemicals Management Strategy. This is being done with support from the Secretariat of the Pacific Regional Environment Programme as well as the United Nations Environment Programme.
- 25 August – In preparation for a drought predicted by the Papua New Guinea National Weather Service, the cabinet approves money to be given to provinces of Papua New Guinea that may have already been affected.

== Holidays ==
- 1 January – New Year's Day
- 26 February – Remembrance Day of the Late First Prime Minister
- 3 April – Good Friday
- 5 April – Easter Saturday
- 6 April – Easter Monday
- 17 June – King's Birthday
- 23 July – National Remembrance Day
- 26 August – Repentance Day
- 16 September – Independence Day
- 25 December – Christmas Day
- 26 December – Boxing Day

== Deaths ==
- 12 October – Noah Musingku, 61–62, confidence trickster and fugitive.
- 14 October – Bob Morris, football manager (national team).
