= 2022 in Papua New Guinea =

- Decades: 2000s; 2010s; 2020s
- See also: Other events of 2022; Timeline of Papua New Guinean history

Events in the year 2022 in Papua New Guinea.

== Incumbents ==
- Monarch - Elizabeth II (until September 8); then Charles III

=== National government ===
- Governor-General - Bob Dadae
- Prime Minister - James Marape

=== Provincial Governors ===
- Central: Robert Agarobe
- Chimbu: Micheal Dua Bogai
- East New Britain: Michael Marum
- East Sepik: Allan Bird
- Enga: Peter Ipatas
- Gulf: Chris Haiveta
- Hela: Philip Undialu
- Jikawa: William Tongamp
- Madang: Peter Yama
- Manus: Charlie Benjamin
- Milne Bay: Sir John Luke Crittin, KBE
- Morobe: Ginson Saonu
- New Ireland: Julius Chan
- Oro: Gary Juffa
- Sandaun: Tony Wouwou
- Southern Highlands: William Powl
- West New Britain: Sasindran Muthuvel
- Western: Taboi Awe Yoto
- Western Highlands: Paias Wingti

== Events ==
- 6 February – Prime Minister James Marape tests positive for COVID-19 and returns home after attending the 2022 Winter Olympics opening ceremony.
- 13 April – A 6.3 magnitude earthquake hits the Papua New Guinean island of New Britain.
- 4 July – 2022 Papua New Guinean general election: Papua New Guineans go to the polls to elect their new government in a heavily guarded election.
- 22 July – Prime Minister James Marape's Pangu Pati wins the general election.
- 10 August – James Marape is re-elected unopposed as Prime Minister by the Parliament after his party Pangu Pati won the general election in July.
- 8 September – Accession of Charles III as King of Papua New Guinea following the death of Queen Elizabeth II.
- 11 September – 2022 Papua New Guinea earthquake: At least eight people are killed and 24 others are injured after a magnitude 7.6 earthquake strikes Morobe Province, Papua New Guinea.
- 13 September – Charles III is officially proclaimed King of Papua New Guinea at National Parliament House, Port Moresby.
- 19 September – A national holiday is observed to mourn the passing of Elizabeth II, Queen of Papua New Guinea.
- 19 September – Papua New Guinean representatives attend the funeral of Queen Elizabeth II in London.
- 25 October - Tribal Clashes Erupted on the Island of Kiriwina killing at least 30 people.

== Deaths ==
- 3 January – Tu'u Maori, 33, rugby league player (national team)
- 3 March – William Samb, politician, MP (since 2015)
- 11 May – Sam Basil, 52, politician, deputy prime minister (since 2020), MP (since 2007), and minister of finance (2019)
- 9 June – Chris Nangoi, politician, MP (since 2017)
- 21 June – Sir Peter Barter, 82, businessman and politician, governor of Madang Province (1997–2002)
- 8 September – Elizabeth II, 96, Queen of Papua New Guinea since 1975, affectionately known as Missis Kwin
