= 2024 in Papua New Guinea =

- Decades: 2000s; 2010s; 2020s
- See also: Other events of 2024; Timeline of Papua New Guinean history

Events in the year 2024 in Papua New Guinea.

== Incumbents ==
- Monarch – Charles III

=== National government ===
- Governor-General – Bob Dadae
- Prime Minister – James Marape

=== Provincial Governors ===
- Central: Robert Agarobe
- Chimbu: Micheal Dua Bogai
- East New Britain: Michael Marum
- East Sepik: Allan Bird
- Enga: Peter Ipatas
- Gulf: Chris Haiveta
- Hela: Philip Undialu
- Jiwaka: William Tongamp
- Madang: Peter Yama
- Manus: Charlie Benjamin
- Milne Bay: Sir John Luke Crittin, KBE
- Morobe: Ginson Saonu
- New Ireland: Julius Chan
- Oro: Gary Juffa
- Sandaun: Tony Wouwou
- Southern Highlands: William Powl
- West New Britain: Sasindran Muthuvel
- Western: Taboi Awe Yoto
- Western Highlands: Wai Rapa

== Events ==
=== January ===
- 10 January – Riots break out in Port Moresby and other cities nationwide following an announcement by prime minister James Marape of a tax deduction which is subsequently retracted. At least 22 people are killed and 41 others are injured.

=== February ===
- 18 February – At least 64 people are killed in an ambush during intertribal clashes in Wabag, Enga Province.

=== March ===
- 18-22 March – Torrential rain and king tides cause floods and landslides nationwide, killing 23 people.
- 24 March–2 April – The Papua New Guinea women's cricket team tour Zimbabwe for 3 ODIs and 3 T20Is; Zimbabwe win the ODI series 3–0 and the T20I series 2–1, with PNG winning the second T20I Super Over.
- 24 March – Three people are killed and 1,000 houses are destroyed following a magnitude 6.9 earthquake in East Sepik Province.

=== April ===
- 15 April – A magnitude 6.5 earthquake strikes West New Britain Province. No damage or casualties are reported.

=== May ===
- 24 May – A landslide hits the village of Kaokalam in Enga Province with a disputed death toll ranging from 160 to 2,000.

=== July ===
- 6 July – Petroleum Minister Jimmy Maladina is charged by Australian police with assault relating to a domestic dispute that occurred in Sydney. He subsequently resigns from the cabinet and is replaced on 10 July by Energy Minister Thomas Opa.
- 16–18 July – At least 26 people are killed in attacks by an armed gang on several villages in Angoram District, East Sepik Province.

=== August ===
- 8 August –Prime Minister Marape launches the rebranded Papua New Guinea Investment Week, expanding focus beyond resources to multiple sectors.

=== September ===
- 6–9 September – Pope Francis conducts the first papal visit to Papua New Guinea since 1995.
- 12 September – Prime Minister Marape survives a vote of no confidence in the National Parliament.
- 17 September – At least 35 people are killed in intertribal clashes near the Porgera Gold Mine in Enga Province.

=== October ===
- 31 October – The government announces that it would boycott the upcoming 2024 United Nations Climate Change Conference in Azerbaijan in November, calling it a "waste of time" amid criticism over unfulfilled pledges on climate change.

=== December ===
- 11 December – Prime Minister Marape backs Bougainville funding 50% of its budget and reopening the Panguna mine, with a $36 billion projected revenue.
- 12 December – Papua New Guinea receives a licence to have a local team play in the Australian National Rugby League beginning in 2028, as part of efforts to strengthen ties and counter China’s influence in the Indo-Pacific.
- 22 December – A Britten-Norman BN-2B-26 Islander operated by North Coast Aviation crashes in Sapmanga Valley in Morobe Province, killing five people on board.

=== Scheduled events ===
- 2024 Papua New Guinea Hunters season

== Holidays ==
- 1 January – New Year's Day
- 26 February – Remembrance Day of the Late First Prime Minister
- 29 March – Good Friday
- 30 March – Easter Saturday
- 1 April – Easter Monday
- 10 June – King's Birthday
- 26 August – Repentance Day
- 16 September – Independence Day
- 25 December – Christmas Day
- 26 December – Boxing Day

== Deaths ==
- 6 February – Jimmy Uguro, politician, MP (since 2017)
- 4 April – Kaia Arua, 33, cricketer (national team)
