= 2019 in Papua New Guinea =

- Decades: 1990s; 2000s; 2010s; 2020s
- See also: Other events of 2019; Timeline of Papua New Guinean history

Events in the year 2019 in Papua New Guinea.

== Incumbents ==
- Monarch: Elizabeth II
- Governor-General: Bob Dadae
- Prime Minister: Peter O'Neill

=== Provincial Governors ===
- Central: Robert Agarobe
- Chimbu: Micheal Dua Bogai
- East New Britain: Nakikus Konga
- East Sepik: Allan Bird
- Enga: Peter Ipatas
- Gulf: Chris Haiveta
- Hela: Philip Undialu
- Jikawa: William Tongamp
- Madang: Peter Yama
- Manus: Charlie Benjamin
- Milne Bay: Sir John Luke Crittin, KBE
- Morobe: Ginson Saonu
- New Ireland: Julius Chan
- Oro: Gary Juffa
- Sandaun: Tony Wouwou
- Southern Highlands: William Powl
- West New Britain: Sasindran Muthuvel
- Western: Taboi Awe Yoto
- Western Highlands: Paias Wingti

== Events ==
- 23 November to 7 December – The non-binding 2019 Bougainvillean independence referendum showed that more than 98% of valid ballots cast were in favor of independence.
- 6 December – The inauguration of Port Moresby Power Station.

== Deaths ==
- 12 January – Christian Conrad Blouin, Roman Catholic prelate, Bishop of Lae (b. 1941).
- 11 December – Albert Toro, actor, director and politician.
