= 2023 in Papua New Guinea =

- Decades: 2000s; 2010s; 2020s
- See also: Other events of 2023; Timeline of Papua New Guinean history

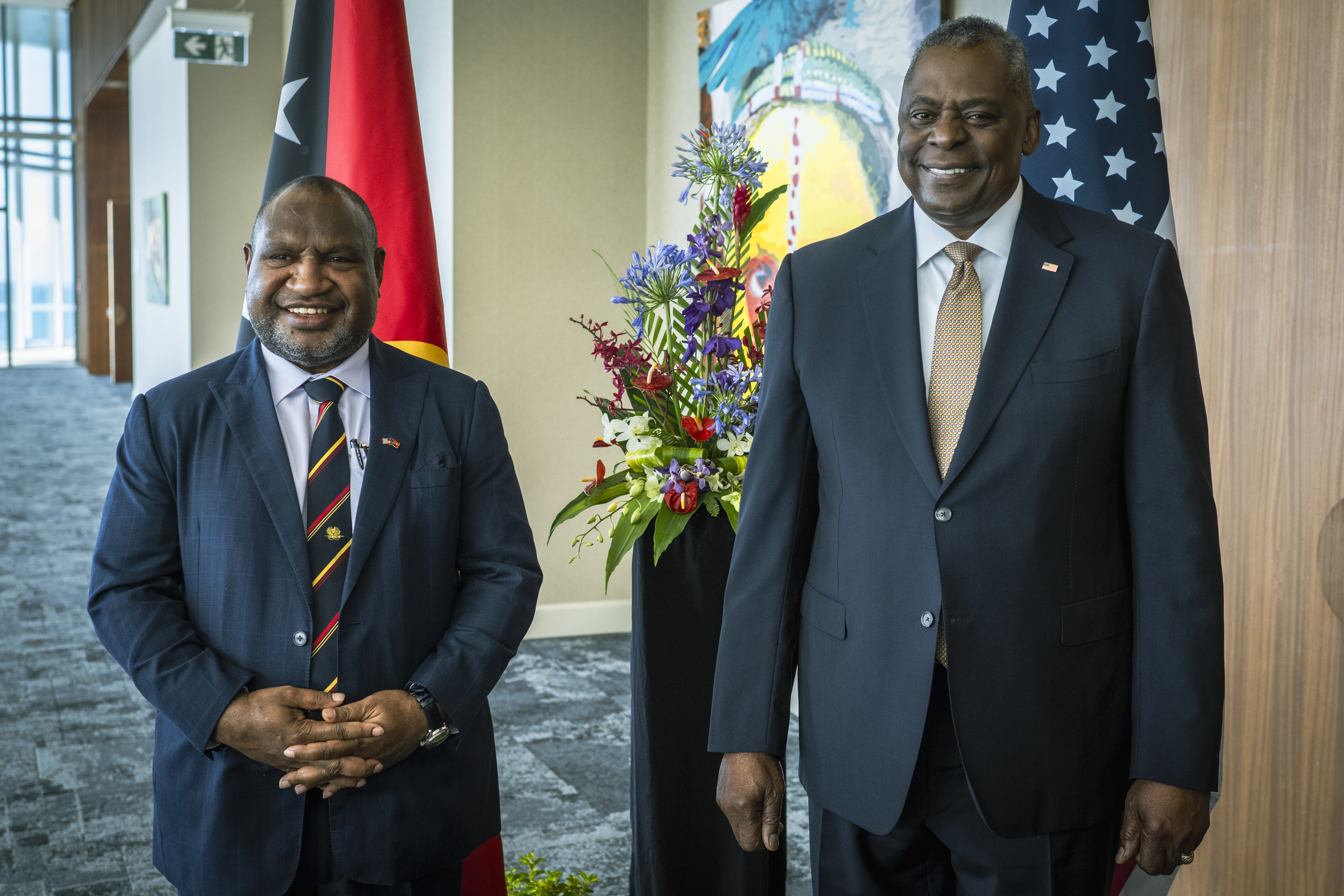
Secretary of Defense Lloyd J. Austin III greets Papua New Guinea Prime Minister James Marape in Port Moresby

Events in the year 2023 in Papua New Guinea.

== Incumbents ==
- Monarch - Charles III

=== National government ===
- Governor-General - Bob Dadae
- Prime Minister - James Marape

=== Provincial Governors ===
- Central: Rufina peter
- National Capital District: Powes Parkop
- Chimbu: Micheal Dua Bogai
- Eastern Highlands Province: Simon B Sia
- East New Britain: Michael Marum
- East Sepik: Allan Bird
- Enga: Peter Ipatas
- Gulf: Chris Haiveta
- Hela: Philip Undialu
- Jikawa: William Tongamp
- Madang: Peter Yama
- Manus: Charlie Benjamin
- Milne Bay: Sir John Luke Crittin, KBE
- Morobe: Ginson Saonu
- Autonomous Region of Bougainville: Peter Tsiamalili Jnr.
- New Ireland: Julius Chan
- Oro: Gary Juffa
- Sandaun: Tony Wouwou
- Southern Highlands: William Powl
- West New Britain: Sasindran Muthuvel
- Western: Taboi Awe Yoto
- Western Highlands: Wai Rapa

== Events ==
- 20 February – A Rescue mission begins after a number of foreign citizens and local guides are kidnapped in a remote region of the country.
- 22 February – Kidnappers release a woman, whilst negotiations involving an Australian professor, and two others are still underway.
- 3 April – 2023 Papua New Guinea earthquake: A 7.1 magnitude earthquake strikes East Sepik Province, Papua New Guinea, killing eight people, injuring several others, and causing damage.
- 6 May – Coronation of Charles III as King of Papua New Guinea and the other Commonwealth realms. Governor-General Sir Bob Dadae attend the ceremony in London.
- 22 May – Papua New Guinea and the United States will sign a security pact today that will see U.S. troops stationed in the country in the largest American presence there since the Second World War.
- 29 August – The Prime Minister of Papua New Guinea James Marape announces that his country will open their Israel embassy in disputed Jerusalem.
