= 2020 in Papua New Guinea =

- Decades: 2000s; 2010s; 2020s
- See also: Other events of 2020; Timeline of Papua New Guinean history

Events in the year 2020 in Papua New Guinea.

== Incumbents ==
- Monarch: Elizabeth II
- Governor-General: Bob Dadae
- Prime Minister: James Marape

=== Provincial Governors ===
- Central: Robert Agarobe
- Chimbu: Micheal Dua Bogai
- East New Britain: Nakikus Konga
- East Sepik: Allan Bird
- Enga: Peter Ipatas
- Gulf: Chris Haiveta
- Hela: Philip Undialu
- Jikawa: William Tongamp
- Madang: Peter Yama
- Manus: Charlie Benjamin
- Milne Bay: Sir John Luke Crittin, KBE
- Morobe: Ginson Saonu
- New Ireland: Julius Chan
- Oro: Gary Juffa
- Sandaun: Tony Wouwou
- Southern Highlands: William Powl
- West New Britain: Sasindran Muthuvel
- Western: Taboi Awe Yoto
- Western Highlands: Paias Wingti

== Events ==
- 20 March – The first case in of COVID-19 in the country was confirmed.
- 30 January – All travelers from Asian countries were banned and the border with Indonesia was closed in order to slow the spread of the virus.

== Deaths ==
- 8 September – Benedict To Varpin, 84, Roman Catholic prelate, Bishop of Bereina (1979–1987) and Archbishop of Madang (1987–2001).
