= 2018 in Papua New Guinea =

- Decades: 1990s; 2000s; 2010s; 2020s
- See also: Other events of 2018; Timeline of Papua New Guinean history

Events in the year 2018 in Papua New Guinea.

== Incumbents ==
- Monarch: Elizabeth II
- Governor-General: Bob Dadae
- Prime Minister: Peter O'Neill

=== Provincial Governors ===
- Central: Robert Agarobe
- Chimbu: Micheal Dua Bogai
- East New Britain: Nakikus Konga
- East Sepik: Allan Bird
- Enga: Peter Ipatas
- Gulf: Chris Haiveta
- Hela: Philip Undialu
- Jikawa: William Tongamp
- Madang: Peter Yama
- Manus: Charlie Benjamin
- Milne Bay: Sir John Luke Crittin, KBE
- Morobe: Ginson Saonu
- New Ireland: Julius Chan
- Oro: Gary Juffa
- Sandaun: Tony Wouwou
- Southern Highlands: William Powl
- West New Britain: Sasindran Muthuvel
- Western: Taboi Awe Yoto
- Western Highlands: Paias Wingti

== Events ==
- 5 January – Kadovar volcano eruption
- 26 February – an earthquake of 7.5 moment magnitude struck in Hela Province, resulting in at least 67 people killed and a further 500 injured.

== Deaths ==
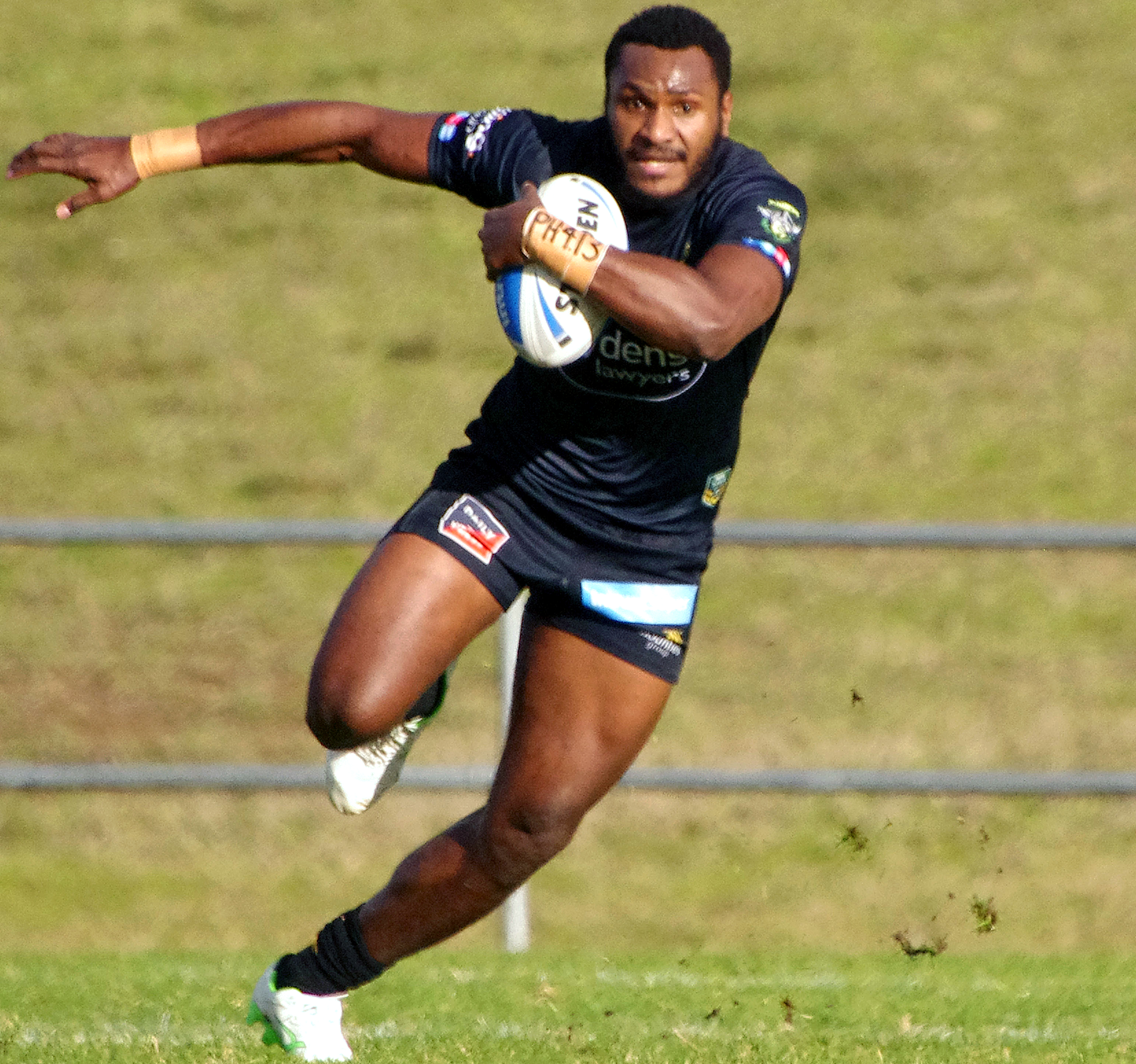
Kato Ottio

- 9 January – Kato Ottio, rugby league footballer (b. 1994).
- 7 August – John Doaninoel, Roman Catholic prelate, Auxiliary Bishop of Honiara (b. 1950).
