= 2016 in Papua New Guinea =

- Decades: 1990s; 2000s; 2010s; 2020s
- See also: Other events of 2016; Timeline of Papua New Guinean history

The following lists events that happened during 2016 in Papua New Guinea.

== Incumbents ==
- Monarch: Elizabeth II
- Governor-General: Michael Ogio
- Prime Minister: Peter O'Neill

=== Provincial Governors ===
- Central: Kila Haoda
- Chimbu: Noah Kool
- East New Britain: Ereman Tobaining Jr.
- East Sepik: Michael Somare
- Enga: Peter Ipatas
- Gulf: Havila Kavo
- Hela: Francis Potape then Anderson Agiru then Philip Undialu then Francis Potape
- Jikawa: William Tongamp
- Madang: Jim Kas
- Manus: Charlie Benjamin
- Milne Bay: Titus Philemon
- Morobe: Kelly Naru
- New Ireland: Julius Chan
- Oro: Gary Juffa
- Sandaun: Amkat Mai
- Southern Highlands: William Powl
- West New Britain: Sasindran Muthuvel
- Western: Ati Wobiro
- Western Highlands: Paias Wingti

== Events ==
=== May ===
- May 29 - Anti-government protests erupt against Prime Minister O'Neill citing corruption and fraud.

=== June ===
- June 8 - Police open fire on student protesters at the University of Papua New Guinea in Port Moresby, protesting against Prime Minister Peter O'Neill, killing four and leaving another seven injured. Police deny the deaths and claim they only used tear gas. A court grants an injunction barring students from protesting on campus while thousands protest and boycott classes calling for O'Neill's resignation over corruption allegations.
- June 9 - Protest leader Noel Anjo demands the Prime Minister either resign or hand himself to police, getting arrested and charged for corruption, and declares the protests will not end otherwise.

=== August ===
- August 3 - A court demands the closure of Manus Island's facility owned by Australia housing migrants.
- August 17 - The governments of Australia and Papua New Guinea confirm the closure of Manus Regional Processing Centre following a request by the supreme court.
