= 2014 in Papua New Guinea =

- Decades: 1990s; 2000s; 2010s; 2020s
- See also: Other events of 2014; Timeline of Papua New Guinean history

The following lists events that happened in 2014 in Papua New Guinea.

== Incumbents ==
- Monarch: Elizabeth II
- Governor-General: Michael Ogio
- Prime Minister: Peter O'Neill

=== Provincial Governors ===
- Central: Kila Haoda
- Chimbu: Noah Kool
- East New Britain: Ereman Tobaining Jr.
- East Sepik: Michael Somare
- Enga: Peter Ipatas
- Gulf: Havila Kavo
- Hela: Anderson Agiru
- Jiwaka: William Tongamp
- Madang: Jim Kas
- Manus: Charlie Benjamin
- Milne Bay: Titus Philemon
- Morobe: Kelly Naru
- New Ireland: Julius Chan
- Oro: Gary Juffa
- Sandaun: Vacant
- Southern Highlands: William Powl
- West New Britain: Sasindran Muthuvel
- Western: Ati Wobiro
- Western Highlands: Paias Wingti

== Events ==
=== January ===
- January 8 – A meteor designated CNEOS 2014-01-08 struck the Earth's atmosphere near the northeastern coast of Papua New Guinea.
- January 18 – A warrant is issued for the arrest of Leader of the Opposition Belden Namah over claims that he sent a threatening letter to the commissioner of police.

=== February ===
- February 16 – A riot breaks out at the Australian-administered Manus Regional Processing Centre in Manus Province, killing 23-year-old Iranian asylum seeker Reza Berati and injuring 70 more. Two men are later found guilty of the murder of the man, each sentenced to 10 years in prison, with 5 years of that term suspended.

=== July ===
- July 17 – The Purari River overflows and more than 34,000 people were affected in the Southern Highlands Province after floods hit southern Papua New Guinea, with 37 houses washed away and major infrastructure reported damaged. No deaths are reported, although there are reports of water contamination in Gulf Province.

=== December ===
- December 1 – A group of 30 armed men raid Lae Nadzab Airport holding passengers hostage and ransack offices.
