= 2027 in Papua New Guinea =

- Decades: 2000s; 2010s; 2020s
- See also: Other events of 2027; Timeline of Papua New Guinean history

Events in the year 2027 in Papua New Guinea.

== Events ==
=== Predicted and scheduled ===
- TBA –
  - The autonomous region of Bougainville in Papua New Guinea aims to gain independence by this year per an agreement made in 2021.
  - 2027 Papua New Guinean general election

== Holidays ==
- 1 January – New Year's Day
- 26 February – Remembrance Day of the Late First Prime Minister
- 26 March – Good Friday
- 28 March – Easter Saturday
- 29 March – Easter Monday
- 10 June – King's Birthday
- 23 July – National Remembrance Day
- 26 August – Repentance Day
- 16 September – Independence Day
- 25 December – Christmas Day
- 26 December – Boxing Day
