= Job Pomat =

Speaker of National Parliament of Papua New Guinea

The Honourable Sir Job Pomat CMG MP

Speaker of the National Parliament of Papua New Guinea
- Incumbent
- Assumed office 2 August 2017
- Preceded by: Theo Zurenuoc

Fisheries Minister
- In office 2011–2012
- Prime Minister: Peter O'Neill

Inter-Government Relations Minister
- In office 2007–2011
- Prime Minister: Michael Somare

Member of the National Parliament of Papua New Guinea
- Incumbent
- Assumed office 2017
- Preceded by: Ronny Knight
- Constituency: Manus Open
- In office 2007–2012
- Preceded by: Charlie Benjamin
- Succeeded by: Ronny Knight
- Constituency: Manus Open

Personal details
- Born: 1960 (age 65–66) Rossun, Manus Island, Territory of New Guinea
- Party: Pangu Party (2022–)
- Other political affiliations: Independent (2020–2022); People’s National Congress (2007-2020)

Sir Job Pomat CMG (born 1960) is a Papua New Guinean politician. He has represented the electorate of Manus Open in the National Parliament of Papua New Guinea on two separate occasions since 2007 and has been Speaker of the National Parliament since 2017.

== Early life ==
Pomat grew up in the village of Rossun on the island of Manus, in what was then the Territory of Papua and New Guinea. His father Peter Pomat, village chief and missionary of the Seventh-day Adventist Church, ran unsuccessfully three times in the elections for the colonial legislative assembly, prior to independence in 1975.

He worked as a technician for various companies before contesting the 1993 provincial election. He served as Speaker and Deputy Governor of the Manus provincial government for two terms.

== Political career ==
Pomat was first elected to the National Parliament at the 2007 general election in the seat of Manus Open, representing People's National Congress. He was appointed Inter-Government Relations Minister in Prime Minister Michael Somare's Cabinet. He then served as Fisheries Minister in Peter O’Neill's Cabinet.

He lost his seat at the 2012 general election after one term to then-New Generation Party member Ronny Knight.

He regained the seat at the 2017 general election and was subsequently elected as Speaker of the tenth National Parliament. As Speaker, he had totems and other artefacts reintroduced into Parliament that his predecessor Theo Zurenuoc had removed in 2013 for religious reasons.

In 2018, he became the deputy leader of People's National Congress.

In 2019, the Australian Financial Review reported that Paladin Solutions PNG, which was awarded government security contracts worth A$423 million on Manus Island, entered into an agreement in 2018 with Peren Investment, a company majority controlled by Pomat's brothers Kepo, Allan and Polosong Pomat. Job Pomat denied any wrongdoing and that he would have indirectly benefited from the agreement.

In May 2019, Pomat was criticised for refusing to allow the opposition to introduce a censure motion against Prime Minister Peter O'Neill, and then refusing to authorise a vote on his own removal as speaker. O'Neill resigned the next day, and Job Pomat presided over the election of James Marape to the position of Prime Minister by MPs.

He resigned from the People's National Congress on 22 June 2020 and became an independent to protect his neutrality as speaker and in response to allegations of fraud.

In 2021, opposition leader Belden Namah filed an application to the Supreme Court against Pomat which alleged that he had breached the Constitution in his role as Speaker. The accusations relate to Pomat's forced adjournment of Parliament in December 2020 and passing of the 2021 national budget without debate.

Pomat won his seat at the 2022 general election as a candidate for the Pangu Party and was re-elected as Speaker of the eleventh National Parliament. As of 2022, he is also the Chairman of Broadcasting of Parliamentary Proceedings, Legislation and National Parliament Committees.

== Personal life ==
Pomat is a member of the Seventh-day Adventist Church.

Pomat's contribution and service to the community was recognised by the Queen of Papua New Guinea, Elizabeth II. In November 2019, Pomat was awarded the Most Distinguished Order of St Michael and St George by the Governor-General Bob Dadae.
