= Lohia Boe Samuel =

Papuan politician

Lohia Boe Samuel is a Papua New Guinean Member of Parliament, representing the constituency of Moresby North-West surrounding the nation's capital, Port Moresby.

Samuel is from the village of Hanuabada, on the outskirts of Port Moresby, in Papua New Guinea. He is a member of the Motu Koita Assembly (consisting of Motu and Koita people, two groups of indigenous Papuans) for the Pangu Pati. He was elected to the 10th National Parliament for Pangu in June 2021.

In March 2022, Samuel and another man were charged with murder over the fatal shooting of a man at a restaurant in Port Moresby. The opposition leader, Belden Namah, called for Samuel's immediate resignation once his trial proceeds. However, Samuel's lawyers said that he is still eligible to campaign during the 2022 Papua New Guinean general election while his trial is under way.
