= Dadi Toka Jr =

Papua New Guinean businessman (born 1977)

Chairman Dadi Toka Jr

Chairman
- Incumbent
- Assumed office 26 October 2018
- Preceded by: Miria Naime Ikupu
- Constituency: Motu Koita Assembly

Deputy Governor
- Incumbent
- Assumed office 26 October 2018
- Constituency: National Capital District (Papua New Guinea)

Personal details
- Born: 8 August 1977 (age 49) Papua New Guinea
- Party: Independent
- Education: Queensland University of Technology
- Profession: Business

Dadi Toka Jr (born 8 August 1977) is a Papua New Guinean businessman and the Chairman of the Motu Koita Assembly, a traditional landowner representative group established as an Assembly by an act of the Parliament of Papua New Guinea. The Chairman of the Motu Koita Assembly is also Deputy Governor of National Capital District, which was established on the lands of the Motu and Koitabu people.

== Education ==
Toka Jr is the youngest child of a large Motuan family and is named after his father, who was among the first council members to be elected after the Motu Koita Assembly was established in 1991. He attended international school in Port Moresby, followed by Anglican Church Grammar School from 1991 to 1995. He attended Queensland University of Technology, graduating with a Bachelor of Business Administration.

== Career ==
Toka Jr has mostly worked in private enterprise and is director of a number of companies, including Tura Sports. In 2011 he was elected Chairman of the Port Moresby General Hospital board. He was also Chief Executive Officer of the Papua New Guinea Cancer Foundation from 2013 to 2018. With Bryan Jared Kramer, he is a former member of the Organising Committee of the Miss PNG franchise of the Miss Pacific Islands beauty pageant.

Toka Jr successfully contested the Chairmanship of the Motu Koita Assembly in 2018, running a campaign focused on generational change under the Motu slogan "Ita eda nega" (It's our time). Of the 17 members elected in 2013, only three were returned, Toka Jr having campaigned hard on a platform of long term neglect and mismanagement of the Assembly and its assets. Toka Jr won with a majority of votes. The outcome of the election was seen as a strong endorsement for generational change and improved rights for Motu Koitabu people.

After his election, Toka Jr quickly re-established essential services and has sought and secured partnerships with development agencies to benefit his constituents.

Toka Jr has campaigned strongly for improved recognition of Motu and Koitabu people, the traditional owners of the land on which Papua New Guinea's capital, Port Moresby, is situated within the National Capital District territory. In early 2019 this brought him into conflict with Governor of Central Province, Robert Agarobe, who called for National Capital District (NCD) to be recognised as part of Central Province. Toka Jr has refuted these claims, primarily on social media, causing tensions but reinvigorating a discussion about ownership and management of traditional lands in the nation's capital.

During the COVID-19 crisis, Toka Jr led the response in Motuan and Koitabuan villages, installing handwashing stations and Motu language education materials before the rest of the country. As PNG instituted a betelnut ban, to stop the prevalent spitting of chewed nuts to limit spread of the disease, Motuan villages were at the forefront of smuggling efforts into the lucrative Port Moresby market. Despite the potential for violence, Toka Jr and the MKA successfully stopped the escalation of unrest.
