= 2013 in Papua New Guinea =

- Decades: 1990s; 2000s; 2010s; 2020s
- See also: Other events of 2013; Timeline of Papua New Guinean history

The following lists events that happened in 2013 in Papua New Guinea.

== Incumbents ==
- Monarch: Elizabeth II
- Governor-General: Michael Ogio
- Prime Minister: Peter O'Neill

== Events ==
- Ok Tedi environmental disaster

== Sports ==
- 2013 PNGNRL season
- 2013 Papua New Guinea National Soccer League

== Deaths ==
- 8 March – Ludwig Schulze, politician
