= Zibang Zurenuoc =

Sir Zibang Zurenuoc KBE (September 1927 – 5 February 2008) was a Papua New Guinean businessman and politician.

== Early life ==
Zurenuoc was born at Sattleberg, Finschhafen.

== Career ==
Under the Australian colonial administration, Zurenuoc served as a co-operative officer in the colonial public service in New Ireland. In 1958, he founded the Finschhafen Marketing and Development Co-operative (FMDC), which later became "now famous". He was also a founding director of Mainland Holdings.

Zurenuoc was appointed business representative to the Morobe Constituent Assembly and served as its chairman.

In the 1977 general election—the first after independence—he was elected to the National Parliament as the member for Finschhafen. He later held the positions of Deputy Speaker and government minister. Under Prime Minister Julius Chan in the early 1980s, he served as Minister for Community and Family Services.

He was the long-time general secretary of the People's Progress Party.

== Honours ==
In 1994, Elizabeth II, Queen of Papua New Guinea, appointed him a Knight Commander of the Order of the British Empire (KBE) on the advice of the Papua New Guinean government, "for community services".

== Family ==
The Zurenuoc family includes several distinguished members:

- His brother Sir Zurewe Zerenuoc was the first Papua New Guinean to head the Evangelical Lutheran Church of Papua New Guinea.
- Another brother, Zure Makili Zurenuoc, was "a pioneer educationist" and also served as MP for Finschhafen after Zibang.
- His nephew Guao Zurenuoc was MP for Finschhafen from 2002 to 2007.
- His son Theo Zurenuoc was MP for Finschhafen from 2007 to 2017.

== Death ==
Zurenuoc died in Port Moresby on 5 February 2008 after undergoing medical treatment.
