= Town-Hanuabada Urban LLG =

Local-level government in Papua New Guinea

Town-Hanuabada Rural LLG
- Country: Papua New Guinea
- Province: National Capital District
- Time zone: UTC+10 (AEST)

Town-Hanuabada Urban LLG is a local-level government (LLG) of National Capital District, Papua New Guinea.
