= Peter Barter =

Papua New Guinea politician (1940–2022)

Sir Peter Barter GCL OBE
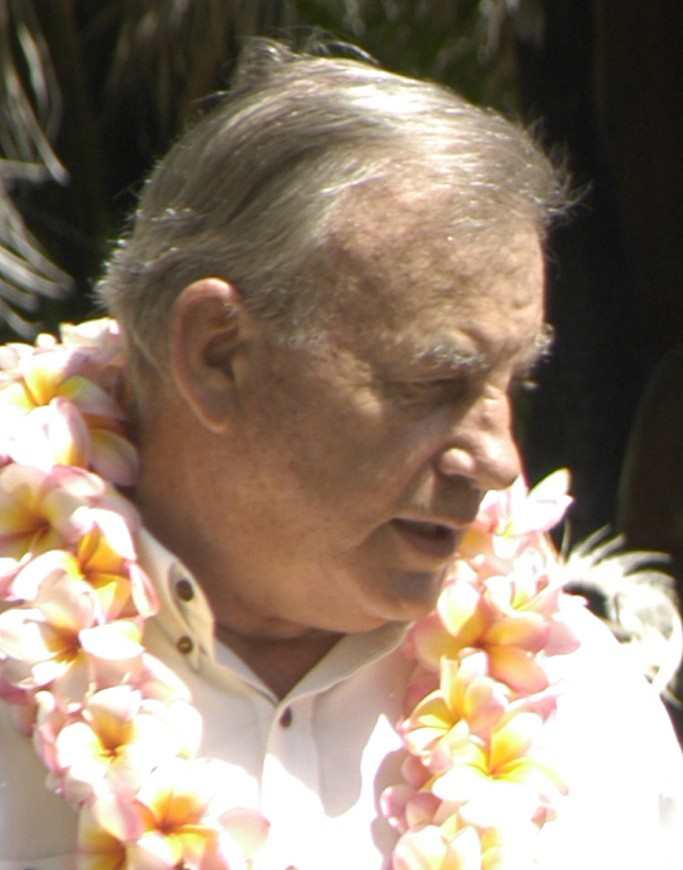
- Barter in 2007

Governor of Madang
- In office 1997–2002

Personal details
- Born: Peter Leslie Charles Barter; 26 March 1940 Sydney, New South Wales, Australia
- Died: 21 June 2022 (aged 82) Cairns, Queensland, Australia
- Spouse: Lady Barter (Janet)
- Education: Newington College

Sir Peter Leslie Charles Barter GCL OBE (26 March 1940 – 21 June 2022) was an Australian-born, naturalised Papua New Guinean businessman and politician based in the Madang Province, where he owned and operated the Madang Resort.

He was Governor of Madang from 1997 to 2002 where he served as Minister for Health and Bougainville Affairs in the Papua New Guinean Government and was active in the reconciliation movement in Bougainville. He established the Melanesian Foundation in 1980, a not-for-profit organisation that invests in remote communities that have been hospitable to tourists.

He was born in Sydney and attended Newington College (1952–1955) before training as a commercial fixed-wing and helicopter pilot and flying for Qantas.

He was knighted in the 2001 New Year Honours, on the recommendation of the Papua New Guinea government.

Barter died in Cairns, Queensland, Australia at the age of 82 following a short illness.
