= Kessy Sawang =

Papua New Guinean politician

Member of the National Parliament
- Incumbent
- Assumed office August 2022
- Constituency: Raikos Open

Personal details
- Born: Rai Coast District, Madang Province, Papua New Guinea
- Party: PFP
- Children: 1
- Education: University of Papua New Guinea
- Profession: Tax specialist

Kessy Sawang is a Papua New Guinean politician and former senior civil servant. Until her election and that of Rufina Peter to the National Parliament in August 2022, Papua New Guinea (PNG) had been one of only three countries without a woman in parliament.

== Early life and education ==
Sawang was born in the Rai Coast District in the southeast of Papua New Guinea’s Madang Province. Her father was a health worker and provincial minister of health who contributed to the eradication of leprosy in the area. She attended the Malala Catholic Secondary School, a boarding school in Madang Province, before obtaining an undergraduate degree in commerce from the University of Papua New Guinea in 1998.

== Career ==
Sawang worked briefly as an accountant in PNG's capital, Port Moresby, before joining the Internal Revenue Commission, where she stayed until 2009. She then joined the Papua New Guinea Customs Service, where she became a deputy commissioner. In 2013 she was appointed head of secretariat for the PNG Taxation Review, which had been set up to comprehensively review the country's fiscal regime. In 2016, it was reported that she had uncovered a large hole in the 2016 budget and had accused the Government of unlawful spending. After failing to be elected in the 2017 Papua New Guinean general election, she became the principal adviser to the minister for Inter-Government Relations, playing an important role in PNG's decentralisation agenda. She is an advocate of social justice and the empowerment of women and girls and promotes her ideas through a regular blog and on Twitter.

== Political career ==
Sawang first stood as a candidate for the Raikos Open seat in the 2017 national election, but was unsuccessful, finishing third. In appealing for funds to help her fight that election she noted that "women are disadvantaged because of traditional cultural norms, male domination, unlawful practices of vote-buying and election rigging and lack of adequate finances to conduct election campaigns". Standing, again, in the 2022 national election, Sawang defeated the incumbent, Peter Sapia, polling 10,888 votes, compared with Sapia's 10,153. One of her pledges was to provide menstrual pads to schoolgirls. Papua New Guinea follows a preferential voting system. After the first count the candidate with the fewest votes is eliminated, and the voters who selected the defeated candidate as a first choice then have their votes added to the totals of their next choice. This process continues until a candidate has more than half of the votes. With many candidates in each constituency, votes can often take a long time to be counted. In fact, Sawang's election was not confirmed until after the new parliament had sat in Port Moresby, with the incumbent prime minister, James Marape, being confirmed for another term. With her victory, she joined Rufina Peter as the only two women elected out of 118 seats contested. Between 2017 and 2022 there had been no female members of parliament.

== See also ==
Other women elected to the Papua New Guinea parliament:

- Josephine Abaijah, 1972–1982; 1997–2002
- Waliyato Clowes, 1977–1982
- Nahau Rooney, 1977–1987
- Carol Kidu, 1997–2012
- Julie Soso, 2012–2017
- Loujaya Kousa, 2012–2017
- Delilah Gore, 2012–2017
- Rufina Peter, 2022–
- Francesca Semoso, 2023–
