= Richard Mendani =

Papua New Guinean politician (1967–2021)

Richard Mendani (16 August 1967 – 20 March 2021) was a Papua New Guinean politician. He was a member of the National Parliament of Papua New Guinea from 2012 until his death in 2021, representing the electorate of Kerema Open in Gulf Province.

== Biography ==
Mendani was educated at Kanabea Primary School, Kerema High School and Sogeri National High School, subsequently gaining a Bachelor of Economics from the University of Papua New Guinea in 1991 and a Diploma in Economic Policy from the National Research Institute in 1992. Prior to entering politics, Mendani was a businessman and managed his own consultancy firm.

He was elected to the National Parliament for the PNG Country Party at the 2012 election. He left the Country Party in 2013 and joined the United Resources Party. In 2015, he lashed out at the impact of corruption in the province, stating that there was a breakdown of capacity due to misuse of funds for personal interests leaving poor people in poverty, with "airstrips, schools and health centres all [...] closed and rundown", while the "people behind the scenes" are "booking hotel rooms, travelling overseas and living in luxury". In facing what he termed a "breakdown in the system of delivering basic services in Gulf Province", he described his experience of trying to deliver services as "painful and challenging". In May 2016, he crossed from the government to the opposition, leaving the United Resources Party for the Papua New Guinea Party, but recontested his seat at the 2017 election for the National Alliance Party.

He died from COVID-19 on 20 March 2021 at the age of 53 in Pacific International Hospital, Port Moresby during the COVID-19 pandemic in Papua New Guinea.

== See also ==
- List of members of the Papua New Guinean Parliament who died in office
