= East Kikori Rural LLG =

Local-level government in Papua New Guinea

- Location within Papua New Guinea
- Coordinates: 7°25′S 144°14′E
- Country: Papua New Guinea
- Province: Gulf Province
- Time zone: UTC+10 (AEST)

East Kikori Rural LLG is a local-level government (LLG) of Gulf Province, Papua New Guinea.

== Wards ==
- 01. Negebare
- 02. Tobare
- 03. Sera
- 04. Omo
- 05. Kabarau
- 06. Irimuku
- 07. Morere
- 08. Ero
- 09. Veraibari
- 10. Kivaumai
- 11. Morovamu
- 12. Wowoubo
- 13. Waitari
- 14. Nahoromere
- 15. Era Maipua
- 16. Gauri
- 17. Tovei

== Sources ==
- OCHA FISS (2018). "Papua New Guinea administrative level 0, 1, 2, and 3 population statistics and gazetteer". Humanitarian Data Exchange. 1.31.9.
- United Nations in Papua New Guinea (2018). "Papua New Guinea Village Coordinates Lookup". Humanitarian Data Exchange. 1.31.9.
