= Guao Zurenuoc =

Papua New Guinea politician

The Right Honourable Guao Zurenuoc MP

Member of Parliament for Finschhafen Open
- In office 29 June 2002 – 6 August 2007
- Succeeded by: Theo Zurenuoc

Personal details
- Party: People's Progress Party

Guao Katucnanec Zurenuoc (died c.25 January 2012) was a Papua New Guinean politician. His father, Sir Zurewe Zurenuoc, was a Lutheran bishop and the first Papua New Guinean to head the Evangelical Lutheran Church of Papua New Guinea. His uncle, Sir Zibang Zurenuoc was a government minister and "long-time general secretary" of the People's Progress Party, of which Guao Zurenuoc also became a member, and eventually a leading figure.

Guao Zurenuoc was secretary for transport, forestry and lands before being elected MP for Finschhafen in the National Parliament of Papua New Guinea in the June 2002 general election. He served a single term, as an Opposition MP, and was defeated in the 2007 general election by his own cousin, Theo Zurenuoc, who was elected as an independent before joining the People's Progress Party.

Guao Zurenuoc "died at his home in Morobe Province"; his death was announced on 25 January 2012.
