= Boroko-Korobosea Urban LLG =

Local-level government in Papua New Guinea

Coordinates: 9.4730°S 147.1945°E

Boroko-Korobosea Rural LLG
- Location within Papua New Guinea
- Country: Papua New Guinea
- Province: National Capital District
- Time zone: UTC+10 (AEST)

Boroko-Korobosea Urban LLG is a local-level government (LLG) of National Capital District, Papua New Guinea.
