= Motu Koita Assembly =

- Map of the customary lands of Port Moresby.
- Predecessor: Motu Koita Interim Assembly
- Headquarters: National Capital District Offices
- Location: Port Moresby, Papua New Guinea
- Chair: Hon. Russell Simon Wavik
- Website: Motu Koita Assembly on Facebook

The Motu Koita Assembly is a representative body of the Motu and Koitabu people, established by an act of the Parliament of Papua New Guinea to serve as the Local Government body of the Motu Koita indigenous villages within NCD. It is the only Assembly of its kind in Papua New Guinea. The current Chairman of the Motu Koita Assembly is Hon. Russell Simon Wavik, who unseated Dadi Toka Jr in the MKA Elections of July 2025. Being the sole Local Government body in NCD, the Chairman of the Motu Koita Assembly also holds the office of Deputy Governor of National Capital District.

== Elections ==
After the Government of Grand Chief Sir Michael Somare passed the Motu Koita Assembly Act in 2007, the Motu Koita Assembly held its inaugural elections in 2008, in which Hon. Miria Naime Ikupu was elected as the First Chairman of the Motu Koita Assembly for a 5 year term. The second elections were held in 2013, in which Mr. Ikupu was elected for a second term as Chairman of the Assembly. However, in 2016, Mr. Ikupu was dismissed from office on medical grounds by the then Minister for Provincial Government & Local Government Affairs, Hon. Soroi Eoe. This saw the elevation of the then Member for Tatana Constituency and Deputy Chairman of the Motu Koita Assembly, Hon. Opao Fo'o Udia, to Acting Chairman of the Assembly. Mr. Udia served the remainder of the term as the Acting Chairman of the Assembly until the Assembly rose for elections in 2018. In 2018, Hon. Dadi Toka Jr was elected as Chairman of the Motu Koita Assembly for a 5 year term. Mr. Toka ended up serving 7 years in office due to the National Government's decision to delay the MKA Elections together with the LLG Elections. In July of 2025, the Motu Koita Assembly Elections were finally held. In this elections, Mr. Dadi Toka Jr lost the Chairman's Seat to Mr. Russell Simon Wavik. Mr. Wavik will serve a 5 year term, until the next elections in 2030.

== Motu Koita Assembly in 2025 and the Members of each Constituency ==
The Members of the Motu Koita Assembly are as follows:

1. Chairman of the Assembly & Deputy Governor of NCD - Hon. Russell Simon Wavik

2. Women's Representative - Motu Koita East - Hon. Gorame Momo

3. Women's Representative - Motu Koita West - Hon. Mere Konio Daera

4. Korobosea (Motu Koita East) - Hon. Bonnie Cardigan

5. Mahuru (Motu Koita East) - Hon. Mal Udia

6. Kirakira (Motu Koita East) - Hon. Babani David Harry (Deputy Chairman of MKA)

7. Pari-Taoata (Motu Koita East) - Hon. Ovia Mataio

8. Pari-Taurama (Motu Koita East) - Hon. Peter Noka

9. Vabukori (Motu Koita East) - Hon. Turaho Sevese Morea

10. Poreporena Laurabada (Motu Koita West) - Hon. Uda Gaba Edea

11. Poreporena Lahara (Motu Koita West) - Hon. Barry Nou Tau

12. Elevala Laurabada (Motu Koita West) - Hon. Andrew Frank

13. Elevala Lahara (Motu Koita West) - Hon. Gavera Areni

14. Elevala Mirigini (Motu Koita West) - Hon. Nao Graeme Boge

15. Tatana Lahara (Motu Koita West) - Hon. Opao Fo'o Udia

16. Tatana Araira (Motu Koita West) - Hon. Allan Nick

17. Baruni (Motu Koita West) - Hon. Gaudi Rei

== History ==
The capital city of Port Moresby was established on the traditional lands of the Motu and Koitabu people in the late 1800s. In recognition of this, the Motu Koitabu Interim Assembly was established under the National Capital District Government Act 1982. It was given powers and rights to legislate in the ten recognised Motu and Koitabu villages and exercise authority over their customary land, which lies within the Port Moresby boundaries. The Motu Koita Assembly was subsequently established under the Motu Koita Assembly Act 2007. The objectives of the Act are: to protect and strengthen the identity of the Motu Koitabu people as the indigenous landowners of the National Capital District; to promote equal opportunity and popular participation in government by the Motu Koitabu people; to provide for the Motu Koitabu people especially the basic human needs for water, health, education, transportation, communication, accommodation and social order through economic self-reliance; and to protect the customary land and natural resources of the Motu Koitabu people.
