= Theo Zurenuoc =

Acting governor-general of Papua New Guinea

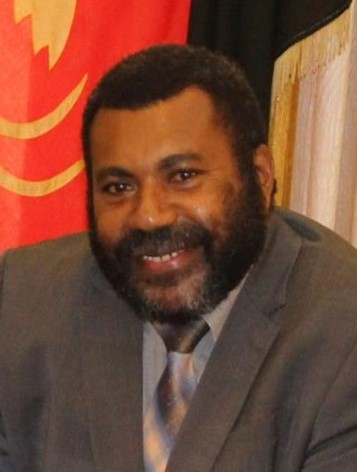
- Zurenuoc in 2016

Acting Governor General of Papua New Guinea
- In office 18 February 2017 – 28 February 2017
- Monarch: Elizabeth II
- Prime Minister: Peter O'Neill
- Preceded by: Michael Ogio
- Succeeded by: Bob Dadae

Speaker of the National Parliament
- In office 3 August 2012 – 2 August 2017
- Preceded by: Jeffrey Nape
- Succeeded by: Job Pomat

Minister for Education
- In office 8 August 2011 – 3 August 2012
- Prime Minister: Peter O'Neill
- Preceded by: James Marape
- Succeeded by: Paru Aihi

Member of Parliament for Finschhafen Open
- In office 6 August 2007 – 2 August 2017
- Preceded by: Guao Zurenuoc
- Succeeded by: Rainbo Paita

Personal details
- Born: Theodore Zibang Zurenuoc; 6 October 1965 (age 61)
- Party: People's National Congress (2015–present); People's Progress (until 2015)

Theodore Zurenuoc (born 6 October 1965) is a Papua New Guinean politician who served as the acting governor-general of Papua New Guinea in February 2017.

He was first elected to the National Parliament in the 2007 general election, as independent MP for Finschhafen District in Morobe Province, though he subsequently joined the People's Progress Party. He won the seat by defeating the incumbent, his cousin Guao Zurenuoc. Previous members of the Zurenuoc family to have held the seat include his father Zibang Zurenuoc (elected in 1977), and his uncle Zure Makili Zurenuoc.

In 2009, during a parliamentary debate on a government bill which would have seen women nominated to Parliament, Zurenuoc opposed the idea of nominated parliamentarians, but said he would support reserved seats for women specifically to elect representatives.

At the start of August 2011, Zurenuoc supported a successful parliamentary motion of no confidence which brought down the government of Acting Prime Minister Sam Abal (standing in for Somare while the latter was hospitalised for a serious heart condition), enabling Peter O'Neill to become prime minister. O'Neill appointed Zurenuoc as his Minister for Education. One of the O'Neill government's first announcements was that it would commit funds to providing free primary education to all children in the country, and subsidised secondary education. Faced with questions about funding, Zurenuoc stated: "We can and will find the money to execute this objective, we will cut out fats of the budget and fund this worthier cost. [...] We will sacrifice expenses in other less important areas to give undivided attention to this noble task of giving our children a future that they have been deprived of for so long." He also said all classes should be in English in primary schools, with classes in indigenous languages abolished, and that outcome-based education should be abandoned, since many teachers considered it to be "suppressive, irrelevant, outdated and not working".

He retained his seat for the People's Progress Party in the 2012 general election. When the new Parliament sat on 3 August, he was elected Speaker. In December 2013, in his capacity as Speaker, he "removed and badly damaged" several carvings adorning the interior of Parliament and representing Papua New Guinea's diverse indigenous cultures. Zurenuoc reportedly considered the carvings to be contrary to Christianity. His action was criticised and ridiculed by Andrew Motu, Director of the Papua New Guinea National Museum and Art Gallery. Specifically, "a lintel containing 19 ancestral masks from the provinces were removed and chopped up", in what was intended to be a prelude to further destruction. In response to the controversy, Prime Minister Peter O'Neill intervened and ordered Zurenuoc not to destroy a "four-tonne pole which contained carving traditions from around the country". The Papua New Guinea Trade Union Congress condemned the destruction, and called for Zurenuoc to be arrested. By contrast, Community Development Minister Loujaya Kouza supported the destruction, and indicated that it had been carried out on advice from an Israeli Christian evangelical movement.

Zurenuoc released a statement to explain his actions, and his intention to continue. He stated that he wanted to remove "spirits of idolatry, immorality and witchcraft" from within Parliament, and to replace them with "a National Unity Pole, which will contain a Bible, a copy of the constitution and an everlasting flame to represent God’s word". In 2015, he was continuing his "plans to replace all of Parliament House's traditional cultural objects with Christian symbols", removing all objects which he deemed to be "idolatrous". Several members of Parliament urged him in vain to stop, while the Trade Union Congress sought legal advice as to whether such actions might be unconstitutional.

In May 2015, while still serving as Speaker, Zurenuoc changed allegiance from the People's Progress Party to the People's National Congress Party, the political party led by Prime Minister Peter O'Neill.

Political offices
Preceded by Jeffrey Nape	Speaker of the National Parliament; 2012–2017	Succeeded by Job Pomat
Government offices
Preceded by Michael Ogio	Governor General of Papua New Guinea (acting); 2017	Succeeded by Bob Dadae
