= Port Moresby Power Station =

Power plant in Kairuku-Hiri, Central, Papua New Guinea

- Country: Papua New Guinea
- Location: Kairuku-Hiri, Central, Papua New Guinea
- Coordinates: 9°19′20.9″S 147°02′36.7″E
- Status: Operational
- Construction began: August 2017
- Commission date: 6 December 2019
- Construction cost: US$100 million
- Owner: NiuPower
- Operators: NiuPower, Wärtsilä

Thermal power station
- Primary fuel: Natural gas

Power generation
- Units operational: 6
- Nameplate capacity: 58 MW

The Port Moresby Power Station is a gas-fired power plant in Kairuku-Hiri District, Central Province, Papua New Guinea.

== History ==
The construction groundbreaking ceremony happened in August 2017. In December 2017, land clearing, preparation, grading and compaction for the site office area were done. In February 2018, the construction for the site office commenced. Ground works and installation of fire water line commenced in March 2018. It was finally inaugurated by Prime Minister James Marape on 6 December 2019.

== Generation units ==
The power plant has six generation units with a total installed capacity of 58 MW.

== Finance ==
The power plant was constructed by Wärtsilä with a cost of US$100 million.
