= Roger Hau'ofa =

Papua New Guinean radio broadcaster

Roger Hau'ofa (December 28, 1943 – March 4, 2017) was a Papua New Guinean radio broadcaster and presenter. Hau'ofa, whose broadcasting career spanned more than fifty years, was called "the voice of Papua New Guinea" for his focus on the country's economic, political and social issues. He was a long-time fixture at NBC PNG, the state-owned radio station, and, more recently, FM100, where he hosted the "Talk Back Show". His constant presence on the radio made him a household name in PNG.

== Biography ==
Roger Hau'ofa was born on December 28, 1943, on Misima Island, Territory of Papua, in present-day Milne Bay Province. His parents, Isikeli Hau'ofa and Mele Sikimeti, were Christian missionaries from Tonga. Hau'ofa had four siblings — two sisters and two brothers.

Hau'ofa's broadcasts became popular and highly influential throughout rural and urban areas of Papua New Guinea with low literacy rates. According to Martyn Namorong, a PNG social commentator, Hau'ofa helped to shape national policy on key issues by exposing residents in rural areas to important, national issues. As Namorong explained to RNZI following Hau'ofa's death in 2017, "Levels of literacy are very low. In some parts of PNG you only have 30% of the population that can read and write...So radio and oral culture is still very strong. It's just about someone being able to negotiate that space and win the audience over. And that's where the gap is."

Hau'ofa suffered from a lengthy illness with kidney failure for over a year, as well as high blood pressure, diabetes, and heart disease. He spent much of February 2017 hospitalized at Pacific International Hospital in Port Moresby. On March 2, following his wishes, Hau'ofa was released from the hospital and flown by Helifix medical helicopter to his wife's home village of home village of Iare in Kairuku District, Central Province. Roger Hau'ofa died from complications of kidney failure in Iare at 11:42 p.m. on March 4, 2017, at the age of 73. He is survived by his wife, Pauline, nine children, approximately twenty grandchildren, and one great-grandchild.

Hau'ofa's funeral was held at the Sir John Guise Stadium in Port Moresby on March 10, 2017. He was buried in Iare, Central Province.

His death came just months after the passing of another influential member of the PNG media, newspaper pioneer Oseah Philemon, who died in December 2016.
