= Kiriwina Island clashes =

2022 unrest in Papua New Guinea

Date	October 25, 2022
Location	Bwetalu and Kavataria, Kiriwina, Milne Bay Province, Papua New Guinea
Result	Inconclusive

Belligerents
Kuboma	Kulumata

Casualties and losses
26 killed	6 killed

On October 25, 2022, violence broke out between the Kuboma and Kulumata on Kiriwina Island, part of the Trobriand Islands chain of Papua New Guinea. The violence was the deadliest in Kiriwina history, and saw over thirty people killed.

== Prelude ==
Under Australian rule, Papua New Guinea banned inter-tribal conflict, in an attempt to ease tensions in an area with thousands of unique tribes and cultures. To resolve disputes between tribes and towns, Papua New Guineans turned to resolving disputes with games of cricket. The concept stuck after Papuan independence in 1975, and generally continues to this day. In September 2022, tensions arose when a Kuboma manwas killed in a fight over a soccer game. The situation escalated on October 19, after Kuboma youthallegedly destroyed the yam harvests of Kulumata villages. Yams are considered an important part of Kiriwina culture, and the crops destroyed would cause food supply issues.

== Clashes ==
Kulumata men painted themselves in tribal war colors, and marched down to the district development authority. When attempting to seek out for answers, Kuboma youth waiting at the station attacked the Kulumata. Clashes broke out, and woman and children on both sides ran away. The men fighting used spears and bush knives. Provincial police chief Peter Barkie claimed that the fighting got so out of hand that local elders couldn't contain it, and that a peace ritual held also did not help matters. The end toll saw twenty-six Kuboma men die and six Kulumata men killed.

== Aftermath ==
Ten police officers were sent from Alotau, the capital of Milne Bay Province, where Kiriwina is located. However, locals claimed the police were outnumbered. PNG Internal Security Minister Peter Tsiamalili claimed that over thirty people were killed in the violence. Local MP Douglas Tomuriesa, who represents the Trobriand Islands, declined to comment to several news agencies.
