= Ronny Knight =

Papua New Guinea politician

Ronny Knight is a politician from Papua New Guinea. He served as a Member of the National Parliament of Papua New Guinea from 2012 to 2017 as a member of the New Generation Party and later the National Party, representing the electorate of Manus Open.

== Early life ==
Knight is the son of Australian naval officer Ronny Knight Senior, who was stationed in Manus in the 1960’s at HMAS Tarangau, which is the PNG Defence Force Lombrum Naval Base today. When Papua New Guinea gained independence in 1975, his parents chose to become citizens of the country.

Knight attended Lorengau Primary School and Manus Provincial High, Manus Province.

== Political career ==
Knight became leader of the New Generation Party following the 2012 election. During the ninth Parliament he served as Vice Minister for Trade, Commerce and Industry. He had resigned from the New Generation Party by 2015.

Knight was suspended from office in 2015 by a PNG Leadership Tribunal due to allegations of the misappropriation of public funds in relation to a decision by the Joint District Planning and Budget Priority Committee to purchase a second-hand vessel for use as a passenger and cargo ferry in Manus, the MV Trader Star. The decision was upheld by the Supreme Court in April 2015 following the suspension being upheld by the Leadership Tribunal on 20 March 2015 and by the National Court on 19 April 2015.

In April 2017, Knight was reinstated as a Member of Parliament by the Supreme Court, who found that the vessel purchased using public funds was not for his personal benefit. They also found that the Leadership Tribunal and prior court proceedings had not been properly conducted, with legal arguments by the public prosecutor being badly drafted. This decision allowed him to contest the 2017 election, where he unsuccessfully ran for the National Party, losing to Job Pomat.

During his time in Parliament he was a critic of the Manus Island Regional Processing Centre. Australian Immigration Minister Peter Dutton criticised and questioned Knight’s credibility to comment on a shooting which took place at the Manus Regional Processing Centre in 2017.

In 2022, he contested the seat again but lost against incumbent Job Pomat, with 44% of the vote after the distribution of preferences.

== Personal life ==
Knight is a Roman Catholic.
