= Powes Parkop =

Papua New Guinea politician

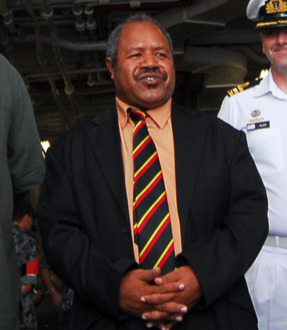
Powes Parkop in 2010

Powes Parkop (born 18 February 1962) is a Papua New Guinean lawyer and politician, from Manus Province.

== Political career ==
A former lecturer in Law at the University of Papua New Guinea, he is the current governor of Port Moresby and the National Capital District serving for three terms. He was elected to the National Parliament of Papua New Guinea in July 2007. He was re-elected in September 2012. In 2017, Parkop was elected again as Governor serving his third term.

In June 2010, Parkop founded the Social Democratic Party.
