= Public holidays in Papua New Guinea =

This is a list of holidays in Papua New Guinea.

== List ==
Date	English name
1 January	New Year's Day
Variable	Good Friday
Variable	Easter Saturday
Variable	Easter Sunday
Variable	Easter Monday
17 June	King's Birthday
23 July	National Remembrance Day
26 August	Repentance Day
16 September	Independence Day
25 December	Christmas Day
26 December	Boxing Day
