= Havila Kavo =

Governor of Gulf Province
- In office September 2011 – 2017
- In office 2007 – June 2010

Interim Governor of Gulf Province
- In office August 2010 – September 2011

Personal details
- Political party: People's National Congress
- Occupation: Politician

Havila Kavo (born 28 August 1961) is a Papua New Guinean politician. He was Governor of the Gulf Province from 2007 to 2017 as a member of the People's National Congress. He briefly lost office in 2010 following a June attempt by opponents in the provincial assembly to oust him; the National Court recognised Pitom Bombom as interim governor in July before reinstating Kavo in August.

== Professional career and election to parliament ==
Kavo was educated at Murua Primary School and Malalaua High School. He trained as a laboratory technician for two years in Rabaul before returning to work at Kerema Provincial Hospital. He won two scholarships to study internationally: in 1989 to study genetics in New Zealand and in 1994 to study microbiology in Melbourne, Australia. He subsequently studied medicine at the University of Papua New Guinea, where he was president of the medical students' association. He graduated in 1994 and returned to Gulf Province, working as a pathologist at Kerema. He was the unsuccessful PNC candidate for Gulf Governor at the 2002 election, having become frustrated at the poor facilities around him in his health work. Following his defeat, he became the provincial overseer for the Christian Life Church and a chicken and vegetable farmer. He is also president of Komara Gulf F.C.

Kavo won the Gulf governorship at his second attempt at the 2007 election. He pledged to achieve improved development in Gulf Province and to gain more benefit for residents from oil and gas projects in the province. In January 2009, he sought to have K51 million of the K220 funding for major projects in his province paid to the Gulf Engineering and Construction company, of which he was the sole director. In May 2009, the landowners of Kikori approved Kavo as their representative in negotiations around their equity participation in liquefied natural gas projects. He refused to sign the Benefit Sharing Agreement for PNG Gas that year after the rejection of several proposals for benefit sharing in Gulf Province, and suggested that the pipeline should be diverted around Gulf Province if benefit for its residents were not provided. In December 2009, he won a long-running court battle over his suspension of provincial administrator Miai Larelake. In March 2010, he announced that the provincial government would sue ExxonMobil over environmental concerns relating to the LNG project; however, the court challenge was dismissed in June.

== Power struggle and first misappropriation arrest ==
In June 2010, the Gulf Provincial Assembly sought to oust Kavo with a vote of no-confidence, raising concerns about his refusal to swear in LLG presidents, failure to conduct meetings and to provide opportunities for budget debate, failure to comply with a number of formal processes and allegations that he had made a number of controversial payments to himself. The motion was successful, but Kavo disputed the outcome and filed a court challenge, claiming that his removal, as well as the meeting it occurred at, was illegal. The National Court initially in July refused Kavo's request for an injunction and held his opponent, MP Pitom Bombom, to be the interim governor. However, in August, the Supreme Court reinstated Kavo as interim governor pending a final resolution of the dispute. A vocal dispute with Bombom and Mark Maipaikai continued throughout the term, although Kavo was eventually confirmed as governor in September 2011.

In April 2011, Kavo was arrested and charged for the alleged misappropriation of over PGK131,000 in public funds from the Gulf administration between January and February 2010. The payments were authorised by then acting Gulf provincial administrator, Simon Peter who was also arrested for his alleged role. Kavo claimed that there had been political interference, citing his rival Maipaikai's position as Minister for Internal Security; when Peter died following his arrest, Kavo claimed that the police had been responsible for the death. Kavo subsequently claimed there was a plot to re-arrest him on the same charges if he were cleared by the committal court, and that the provincial police commander had been heard making statements to that effect. He was subsequently acquitted by the committal court.

== Second term ==
Kavo was re-elected at the 2012 election. In October 2012, the misappropriation allegations re-emerged when office of the public prosecutor referred the matter for trial as an ex-officio indictment, despite their failure to win a committal the previous year. In December 2012, the provincial assembly called for Kavo to return to the province and operate from Kerema rather than his office in Port Moresby. In the same month, Kavo signed a deal to develop the Pala Inlet Port Project, providing a deepwater point in East Kikori. In August 2013, as discussions around the Elk and Antelope gas fields at Baimuru progressed, Kavo insisted that all gas resources from the fields must be processed in the province. In November 2013, he officiated at launching ceremonies for a water supply scheme for Kerema township and a major upgrade for Kerema High School. In December, he witnessed the signing of a partnership between Total S.A. and InterOil to develop the Elk-Antelope gas fields.

Kavo's misappropriation trial began in April 2014. In September, he was found guilty of misappropriating K131,338 from a trust fund belonging to Gulf Province, with Deputy Chief Justice Sir Gibbs Salika holding that Kavo's application of the funds for personal use had been "dishonest". He was sentenced to three years in jail in December 2014, with eighteen months suspended due to Kavo having repaid the money. He appealed and was released on bail, while landowners expressed concerns about missing out on promised benefits due to his jailing. Several politicians called for him to step down pending his appeal and Attorney-General Ano Pala wrote that he could not perform the duties of governor, suggesting the provincial assembly appoint an interim governor, while Kavo insisted that he remained the validly-elected Governor. In June 2015, Kavo was again arrested while on bail and charged with misappropriating K783,195 in separate proceedings to those he was already on bail for. In August 2015, he won his Supreme Court appeal, which quashed the September 2014 conviction.

In February 2016, Kavo called for the national government to honour its commitments regarding local benefits from the PNG Gas project, including the Piam Inlet Port, completion of the Gulf-Southern Highlands Highway and the construction of ten satellite towns, claiming that nine years and passed and his "people were still waiting". In April 2016, he was committed for trial in the National Court over the June 2015 misappropriation charges. In November 2016, Kavo raised concerns about reports that ExxonMobil wished to purchase InterOil shares, raising fears of an LNG monopoly in Papua New Guinea.

He lost his seat at the 2017 election to former Deputy Prime Minister Chris Haiveta, who he had defeated when he won the governorship in 2007.

National Parliament of Papua New Guinea
| Preceded by Chris Haiveta | Member for Gulf Provincial; 2007–2017 | Succeeded by Chris Haiveta |
| Preceded by Chris Haiveta | Governor of Gulf Province; 2007–2010 | Succeeded by Pitom Bombom (interim) |
| Preceded by Pitom Bombom (interim) | Governor of Gulf Province; 2010–2017 | Succeeded by Chris Haiveta |
