= Rufina Peter =

Papua New Guinean politician

Governor of Central Province
- Incumbent
- Assumed office August 2022
- Preceded by: Robert Agarobe

Member of the National Parliament
- Incumbent
- Assumed office August 2022
- Preceded by: Robert Agarobe
- Constituency: Central Province Regional

Personal details
- Born: Goilala District, Territory of Papua
- Party: PNC
- Education: Master of Economics (Agricultural economics)
- Alma mater: Papua New Guinea University of Technology; University of New England (Australia)
- Profession: Economist

Rufina Peter is a Papua New Guinean agricultural economist and politician. Until her election to the National Parliament on 5 August 2022, Papua New Guinea (PNG) was one of only three countries without a woman in parliament. She was also elected as Governor of Central Province in the 2022 general election, becoming the province's first female governor.

== Early life and education ==
One of eight children, Peter attended a Catholic school in Tapini in the hilly, northwestern part of Central Province. Her father did not earn enough to support four children in high school and she had to work while at school to help pay for the fees. She obtained an undergraduate degree in agriculture from the Papua New Guinea University of Technology in Lae between 1985 and 1988 and a master's degree in agricultural economics from the University of New England, in Armidale, New South Wales, between 1990 and 1992. She was a participant in the 2013–2014 Australian Rural Leadership Program.

== Career ==
Peter's first job was as an economist with the PNG Cocoa Board. She then became a first assistant secretary at the government's Department of Agriculture and Livestock, before moving to the Institute of National Affairs where, among other activities, she supported the PNG Women in Agriculture Development Foundation. After a spell at the Department of Provincial & Local Government Affairs, she joined the Bank of Papua New Guinea in 2017.

== Political career ==
Peter contested her first political campaign in the 2017 Papua New Guinean general election, although her bid was unsuccessful. Nonetheless, she received the most votes of any female candidate in the country. At the time, she attributed the lack of success of women in PNG politics to the commonly held perception that politics is a male-dominated field, and that women are not suited to be political leaders. Peter observed that the existing political climate promotes corrupt practices and that candidates do not have sufficient resources to campaign effectively. She also noted that tribal leaders play a significant role in the decision-making of voters, and since most of them are male, this is an additional challenge for female candidates.

In the 2022 general election, Peter was one of 167 women running for the 118 seats, compared to 3,458 men. She emerged victorious in the Central Province seat, becoming both the governor of the province and a member of parliament. Papua New Guinea employs a preferential voting system, and after all votes had been tallied, she had defeated her rival, the incumbent Robert Agarobe, with 62,361 votes to 58,917. Peter ran as a member of the People's National Congress Party. Before her election, Papua New Guinea was one of only three countries worldwide without a female parliamentarian. Four days later, Kessy Sawang was also elected, further increasing the number of women in the National Parliament.

== See also ==
Other women elected to the Papua New Guinea parliament:

- Josephine Abaijah, 1972–1982; 1997–2002
- Waliyato Clowes, 1977–1982
- Nahau Rooney, 1977–1987
- Carol Kidu, 1997–2012
- Julie Soso, 2012–2017
- Loujaya Kousa, 2012–2017
- Delilah Gore, 2012–2017
- Kessy Sawang, 2022–
- Francesca Semoso, 2023–
