= Francis Potape =

Francis Mulungu Potape (born 16 June 1972) was the Governor for Hela Province. He was appointed by the Hela Provincial Assembly after the death of the sitting governor, Anderson Agiru. Potape was Petroleum and Energy Minister of Papua New Guinea. He was first elected Member of Parliament for Komo-Margarima Open in 2008 and was appointed Minister of Petroleum and Energy in June 2011. His ministerial appointment was rescinded under the disbanding of the Michael Somare government in August 2011, but Potape was reinstated as Minister of Petroleum and Energy in December 2011, replacing then Minister, William Duma.

Potape has a master's degree in Engineering.

== Controversies ==
=== 2007 Parliamentary Election ===
In September 2007, former Member of Parliament, Aluago Alfred Kaiabe, challenged Potape’s election as the Member of Parliament for the Komo Magarima Open Seat in the 2007 National Election. The National Court of Justice ruled, in May 2008, that there had been 4,882 votes illegally cast for Potape in his election and that as a consequence, the election for the Komo Magarima Open Seat was void and that Potape was not elected.

Potape was subsequently re-elected as the Member for Komo-Margarima, for the United Resources Party, in a December 2008 by-election.

=== 2011 Fraud Allegations ===
Potape was arrested and charged by the government appointed Investigation Task Force Sweep, on one count of conspiracy to defraud the State and another count of misappropriation in November 2011. The charges relate to payments of PGK60,000 personally paid to Potape by the Komo Magarima District while he was chairman of the Joint District Planning and Budget Priority Committee. The sitting allowance payments were found to be in excess of those approved by the Salaries and Remuneration Commission.

He subsequently released a statement criticising the Peter O'Neill government for paying PGK70 million to a hand-picked number of landowners.
