= Michael Ogio =

Governor-General of Papua New Guinea from 2011 to 2017

Sir Michael Ogio GCL GCMG CBE KStJ
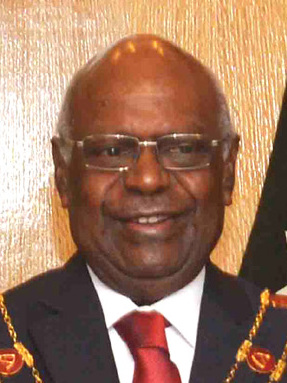
- Ogio in 2016

9th Governor-General of Papua New Guinea
- In office 25 February 2011 – 18 February 2017; Acting: 20 December 2010 – 25 February 2011
- Monarch: Elizabeth II
- Prime Minister: Michael Somare; Sam Abal (acting); Peter O'Neill
- Preceded by: Jeffery Nape (acting)
- Succeeded by: Theo Zurenuoc (acting)

Personal details
- Born: 7 July 1942 Tinputz, North Bougainville, Territory of New Guinea
- Died: 18 February 2017 (aged 74) Port Moresby, National Capital District, Papua New Guinea
- Party: People's Democratic Movement

Sir Michael Ogio GCL GCMG CBE KStJ (7 July 1942 – 18 February 2017) was a Papua New Guinean politician who served as the ninth governor-general of Papua New Guinea from 2011 until his death in 2017. He was a member of the People's Democratic Movement party.

== Biography ==
He became acting governor-general on 20 December 2010 when Jeffrey Nape resigned after one week without explanation. He was elected as Governor-General in his own right on 14 January 2011 when he defeated Pato Kakeraya 65-23. He was sworn in on 25 February 2011.

On 26 April 2011, Queen Elizabeth II conferred the honour of knighthood and invested him as Knight Grand Cross of the Most Distinguished Order of St Michael and St George on his appointment as Governor-General of Papua New Guinea at Windsor Castle.

== Honours ==
- Papua New Guinea:
  - Grand Companion of the Order of Logohu (GCL), 2011. As 9th Governor-General of Papua New Guinea.
- United Kingdom:
  - Commander of the Order of the British Empire (CBE), 10 June 1994. For services to the community and politics.
  - Knight Grand Cross of the Order of St Michael and St George (GCMG), 26 April 2011.
  - Knight of the Most Venerable Order of the Hospital of Saint John of Jerusalem (KStJ), 23 August 2011.

== Death ==
Ogio died in office on 18 February 2017, in Port Moresby, at the age of 74.

Political offices
Preceded by Jeffery Nape (acting)	Governor General of Papua New Guinea; 2010–2017; Acting: 2010–2011	Succeeded by Bob Dadae
Government offices
Preceded by Mao Zeming	Deputy Prime Minister of Papua New Guinea; 2000–2002	Succeeded by Allan Marat
