= Order of Logohu =

Order of merit in Papua New Guinea

- Grand Companion insignia

Awarded by the Monarch of Papua New Guinea
- Type: Order of merit
- Established: 23 August 2005
- Eligibility: Citizens of Papua New Guinea as well as foreigners as honorary recipients
- Awarded for: Service to Papua New Guinea
- Status: Currently constituted
- Founder: Elizabeth II
- Sovereign: Charles III
- Chancellor: Governor-General of Papua New Guinea
- Grades: Grand Companion of Logohu (GCL); Officer of Logohu (OL); Member of Logohu (ML); National Logohu Medal (LM)

Precedence
- Next (higher): Dependent on grade
- Next (lower): Dependent on grade
- Grand Companion ribbon Ribbon of all other classes and medal

The Order of Logohu is the principal order of the Order of Papua New Guinea. Logohu is a Motuan word for the bird-of-paradise, the official national symbol of Papua New Guinea since its independence. The Order consists of four ranks.

== Classes of the Order ==
=== Grand Companion of the Order of Logohu ===
The Grand Companion of the Order of Logohu (GCL) is awarded to those citizens of Papua New Guinea and others for service, achievement, and merit in the highest degree, sustained over a period of twenty years. The award may be given to no more than fifty living persons. Recipients of the Grand Companion class are titled "Chief". The Chancellor of the Order of Logohu is titled as "Grand Chief" as well as one other living recipient of the class. The title of Grand Chief is currently held by Grand Chief Sir Bob Dadae GCL GCMG.

=== Officer of Logohu ===
The Officer of Logohu (OL) is awarded for distinguished service to Papua New Guinea, or to a local community, sustained over a period of at least ten years.

=== Member of Logohu ===
The Member of Logohu (ML) is awarded for commendable service to a particular area of endeavour, to Papua New Guinea, or to a local community, sustained over a period of at least seven years.

=== National Logohu Medal ===
The National Logohu Medal (LM) is awarded for exemplary service in a profession, career, or industry group, or to the general community, over a period of at least five years.

== Current composition ==
- Sovereign: Charles III
- Chancellor: Grand Chief Sir Bob Dadae GCL GCMG KStJ

Royal Chiefs

- The Princess Royal (2005)

Grand Companions

- Dame Josephine Abaijah GCL DBE – First Woman elected to the PNG Parliament
- John Momis GCL (2005) – Long Serving Parliamentarian and Framer of the PNG constitution
- Sir Donatus Mola GCL (2005) – Former Bougainville Chief
- Archbishop Karl Hesse, GCL – Catholic Archbishop Emeritus of Rabaul
- Boyamo Sali GCL (2009) – Former Cabinet Minister of PNG
- Mathew Siune GCL (2009) – Former Cabinet Minister of PNG
- Sir Akepa Miakwe GCL(2011) – Former politician of Unggai-Bena in Eastern Highlands
- Sir Brian Barnes GCL (2011) – Former Archbishop of Port Moresby

Honorary Grand Companions

- Bill Clinton (2006) – Former President of the United States
- Susilo Bambang Yudhoyono GCB GCL AC (2010) – Former President of the Republic of Indonesia
- Narendra Modi (2023) – Prime Minister of India

== Precedence ==
The precedence of the classes of the Order of Logohu vary, they are as follows:

Higher	Order of Logohu Class	Lower
Cross of Valour	Grand Companion of Logohu	Companion of the Star of Melanesia
Companion of the Star of Melanesia	Officer of Logohu	Member of Logohu
Officer of Logohu	Member of Logohu	National Logohu Medal
Member of Logohu	National Logohu Medal	Cross of Medical Service Medal
