= Noah Kool =

PNG international rugby league footballer & politician

Noah Kool Yalba
Personal information
- Full name: Noah Kool Yalba
- Born: 10 October 1962 (age 62); Papua New Guinea

Playing information
Representative
Years	Team	Pld	T	G	FG	P
1990	Papua New Guinea	1

Noah Kool Yalba (born 10 October 1962) is a Papua New Guinean politician. He has been the Governor of Chimbu Province from 2012 to 2017, as a member of the governing People's National Congress.

Kool was a school teacher and member of the Papua New Guinea rugby league team prior to entering politics. He played in one match for Papua New Guinea, playing against the Great Britain Lions during their 1990 tour.

He was an unsuccessful candidate for the Chimbu governorship at a March 2004 by-election (for the People's Labour Party) and the 2007 election (for the United Party). He won the seat on his third attempt as an independent at the 2012 election, and joined the governing People's National Congress after the election.

In October 2012, he set up a permanent office for the province in Port Moresby to minimise the expense of trips to the capital by provincial public servants. In February 2013, he was credited with the opening of the Chimbu Teachers College, the first tertiary institution in the province, as a means of developing human resources to support economic growth in what Kool described as a province "geographically rugged and unsuitable for any major economic development. In May 2015, he called for tougher cannabis trafficking laws. In late 2015, he repeatedly called for greater aid for the province in response to a devastating drought which had dried up water supplies and destroyed crops, declaring that it had become an "emergency situation". In May 2016, Kool announced that he had secured funding for the Simbu Unitech Satellite Campus, a Kundiawa campus of the Lae-based Papua New Guinea University of Technology.

National Parliament of Papua New Guinea
Preceded by John Garia	Member for Chimbu Provincial; 2012–present	Incumbent
