= Robert Agarobe =

Papua New Guinean politician and businessman

The Honourable Robert Agarobe MP

Governor of Central Province
- In office 2017 – August 2022
- Preceded by: Kila Haoda
- Succeeded by: Rufina Peter

Member of National Parliament of Papua New Guinea
- In office 2017 – August 2022
- Preceded by: Kila Haoda
- Succeeded by: Rufina Peter
- Constituency: Central Provincial

Personal details
- Party: Pangu Party (2017–)
- Other political affiliations: Independent (2017)
- Children: Elvis Agarobe
- Education: Port Moresby Technical College
- Website: robertagarobe.com (Inactive)

Robert Agarobe is a Papua New Guinea businessman and politician. He was the Governor of Central Province and a Member of the National Parliament of Papua New Guinea, but was unseated by Rufina Peter in the 2022 Papua New Guinean general election.

== Early life ==
Agarobe was born at Sopas Hospital in Enga Province. He attended Gabagaba Primary School and Kwikila High Secondary. He obtained a certificate in Trade and Aircraft Maintenance from Port Moresby Technical College. He then became an apprentice with Aircair Ltd in 1984. He became a Licensed Aircraft Maintenance Engineer. Through his career, he worked for Islands Nationair, Heli Niugini, Helitech, PNGDF Air Transport Wing, RPNGC Police Air Wing, Helicopter Resources Australia, and Berjaya Air. In September 1998, he founded his own company, Helifix Aviation.

== Political career ==
He was first elected to the National Parliament at the 2017 general election, running as an independent candidate. Following his election, he joined the Pangu Party. He then became the Chairman of the Economic Policy Committee. On 24 May 2019, he moved from the Government to the Opposition.

Agarobe has described his vision to move provincial government offices from the National Capital District, which is surrounded by Central Province, into towns such as Kwikila, Kupiano, Bereina and Tapini. This has brought Agarobe in conflict with representatives of National Capital District, particularly Motu Koita Assembly Chairman and Deputy Governor of NCD, Dadi Toka Jr, who has been openly critical of Agarobe's claims to Motu Koitabu tribal lands.
