= National Capital District (Papua New Guinea) =

National Capital District of Papua New Guinea

National Capital District (NCD) Nesenel Kapitol Distrik (Tok Pisin)
- Flag

- NCD in Papua New Guinea
- Coordinates: 9°4′S 147°2′E
- Country: Papua New Guinea
- Established: 16 September 1975
- Capital: Port Moresby
- Districts: List: Moresby North East District; Moresby North West District; Moresby South District

Government
  - Governor: Powes Parkop

Area
  - Total: 240 km^{2} (93 sq mi)

Population (2024 census)
  - Total: 756,754
  - Density: 3,200/km^{2} (8,200/sq mi)
- Time zone: UTC+10:00 (PNGST)
- HDI (2019): 0.725 high · 1st of 22
- Website: ncdc.gov.pg

The National Capital District of Papua New Guinea is the incorporated area around Port Moresby, which is the capital of Papua New Guinea. Although it is surrounded by Central Province, where Port Moresby is also the capital, it is technically not a part of that province. It covers an area of 240 km^{2} (93 sq mi) and has a population of 756,754 (2024 census). It is represented by three open MPs and an NCD-wide representative in the National Parliament of Papua New Guinea who acts as Governor of the National Capital District; however, these MPs do not have the same powers as elsewhere in the country due to the role of the National Capital District Commission.

== Governors ==
The National Capital District did not have a decentralised administration with a Premier, as with the other provinces, prior to 1995; however, since the 1995 reforms of provincial governments it has been headed by a Governor, albeit one with more limited powers.

Premier	Term
Bill Skate	1995–1997
Philip Taku	1997–1999
run by managers	1999–2001
Philip Taku	2001
run by managers	2001–2006
Wari Vele	2006–2007
Powes Parkop	2007–present

== Local-level governments ==
Local-level governments of National Capital District are:

District	District Capital	LLG Name
National Capital District	Port Moresby	Gerehu Urban
National Capital District	Port Moresby	Waigani-University Urban
National Capital District	Port Moresby	Tokarara-Hohola Urban
National Capital District	Port Moresby	Gordons-Saraga Urban
National Capital District	Port Moresby	Boroko-Korobosea Urban
National Capital District	Port Moresby	Kilakila-Kaugere Urban
National Capital District	Port Moresby	Town-Hanuabada Urban
National Capital District	Port Moresby	Laloki-Napanapa Urban
National Capital District	Port Moresby	Bomana Urban

== Electorates ==
A map of the three open electorates in the National Capital District

In the National Parliament of Papua New Guinea, the National Capital District is represented by three open electorates and one provincial electorate.

Electorates in the National Capital District (as of the 2022 general election)
Electorate	Member	Party
Moresby North-East Open	John Kaupa	Pangu
Moresby North-West Open	Lohia Boe Samuel	Pangu
Moresby South Open	Justin Tkatchenko	SDP
NCD Provincial	Powes Parkop	SDP
