= Repentance Day =

Public holiday in Papua New Guinea, celebrated on 26 August

- Observed by: Papua New Guinea
- Date: 26 August
- Next time: 26 August 2025
- Frequency: annual

Repentance Day, on 26 August, is a public holiday in Papua New Guinea. It is celebrated by "prayer ceremonies" across the country.

It was established on 15 August 2011 by Prime Minister Peter O'Neill, who had come to power less than two weeks earlier. The announcement came only eleven days before the first Repentance Day was to be celebrated. It was made a public holiday at the request of "a group of churches", which had initially submitted the request to O'Neill's predecessor Sam Abal, before the latter was ousted in a motion of no confidence.

Virtually no explanation of the day's purpose was provided by the government, reportedly creating some confusion among Papua New Guineans as 26 August arrived. Pastor Jack Edward of the Shema Evangelism Ministry was made Repentance Day coordinator, and said the purpose was for people to "come together and pray and ask the Lord to forgive us for the wrongs that are happening in our nation". It was intended as a day of Christian prayer, in a predominantly Christian nation. Imam Mikail Abdul Aziz, described by the Australian Broadcasting Corporation as the "spiritual leader" of Papua New Guinea's "4,000 practising Muslims", said he did not oppose the idea, but it might send a "wrong message", as repentance should occur every time a wrong is committed, rather than once a year. As the day was little publicised, many businesses were initially uncertain whether it was indeed supposed to be a public holiday, requiring them to give their employees the day off or pay them double. The Port Moresby Chamber of Commerce obtained a copy of the Government Gazette to convince its members that it was indeed a public holiday.

On 26 August 2011, prayer ceremonies were held in churches throughout the country. In Port Moresby, the capital, a ceremony at the Rev Sioni Kami Memorial church was attended by "representatives of 20 provinces" and various "national leaders" and "church leaders", for "special prayer and Bible readings" and "thanksgiving prayers". Participants asked God to lead the nation. A parish priest in Boroko was reported by The National as saying that religious values were "essential to our identity and our culture", and people's church attendance on such a public holiday revealed a difference between Papua New Guinean identity and that of many other countries. On Karanget Island in Madang, the day was celebrated through children depositing the national flag on a church altar, symbolically "deliver[ing] the nation to God".
