= Peter Yama =

Papua New Guinea politician

Peter Yama (born 12 December 1955) is a businessman and Papua New Guinean politician. He was the former governor for Madang Province from 2017-2022. Previously he was Member of Parliament for Usino Bundi between 1994–1997 and 2002-2007. In 2003 he succeeded Peter O'Neill as the Minister of Labour and Industrial Relations under Prime Minister Michael Somare. Prior to this, he was appointed Minister for Transport and Works in 1996. He was briefly Leader of the Opposition in 2004.

Yama is the head of Yama Security Services Ltd, which is a subsidiary of his Yama Group of companies. He has an extensive property portfolio and owns the Smugglers Inn hotel in Madang.

== Controversies ==
Yama was referred to the Public Prosecutor in July 1997 amid allegations of misconduct which included, "improper application and failure to acquit EDF and other public funds, conflict of interest, using his position to obtain private a [sic] bank loan and attempting to purchase 2 ships from the government below market price".

The matter was then referred to a leadership tribunal, which investigates alleged cases of misconduct by ministers and senior public officials, and which recommended the dismissal of Yama from his office in December 2004. This decision was ultimately overturned in February 2005 due to insufficient evidence on the majority of the counts. Yama was, however, fined K1000 for having been biased in his distribution of PGK1.6 million under the Rural Transport Development Program to his then Sumkar electorate.

In 2002 Yama issued a complaint against the State for PGK38.7 million, alleging that he had been prevented access to a piece of land leased to him in 1988. Attorney General Zacchary Gelu awarded Yama a PGK15.5 million Deed of Settlement in compensation for lost earnings. However, in 2010 a government Commission of Inquiry found that Yama's claim had been a fraudulent one, as it had failed to comply with mandatory procedural requirements and had been filed in respect of a plot of land that did not exist. The Commission referred Yama for criminal prosecution for making an unlawful claim and ordered that civil action be taken against Yama for unpaid land rentals to the effect of PGK61,015.

In December 2009, Yama was awarded PGK7.6 million in a case against Motor Vehicle Insurance Limited for breach of contract. However, Bank of South Pacific (BSP) attempted to secure this money, claiming that Yama had outstanding debts. Yama denied that he had any existing debts with BSP and brought charges of fraud against the bank. Two Australian executives at BSP were subsequently arrested as a consequence of this action.

The executives, Robin Fleming and John Maddison, were subsequently released on bail. Australian law firm Gadens Lawyers, which represented BSP in the court action against Yama, were forced to withdraw their involvement in the case following physical threats to their legal team by armed groups in Port Moresby.
