= Charlie Benjamin =

Papua New Guinean politician

Charlie Benjamin (born 5 November 1964) is a Papua New Guinean politician. He has been Governor of Manus Province since 2012, and was formerly the member for Manus Open in the National Parliament of Papua New Guinea from 1997 to 2007. He was Vice-Minister for Public Enterprises under Bill Skate (1998–1999) and Minister for Labour and Employment (2000–2001) and Minister for Lands and Physical Planning (2001–2002) under Mekere Morauta. As governor from 2012, he has featured prominently in issues relating to the Australian-run Manus Regional Processing Centre. Benjamin has variously been an independent (1997–1999) and a member of the Advance Papua New Guinea Party (1999–2001, 2001–2003), People's Democratic Movement (2001) and People's National Congress (2003–present).

== First and second terms ==
Benjamin was first elected to the National Parliament at the 1997 election as an independent MP. He served as Shadow Minister for Forests from July 1997 until June 1998, when he joined the government, subsequently serving as Vice-Minister for Public Enterprises under Bill Skate from July 1998 until Skate's defeat in July 1999. He then served as Minister for Labour and Employment (2000-2001) and Minister for Lands and Physical Planning (2001-2002) in the government of Mekere Morauta. Benjamin joined the new Advance Papua New Guinea Party in June 1999, became part of the People's Democratic Movement in April 2001 following its merger with the APP, before reviving the APP with himself as leader in August 2001.

Benjamin was re-elected for the APP in Manus Open at the 2002 election, before merging the party with the People's National Congress in November 2003. He served as Shadow Minister for Lands and Physical Planning under opposition leader Morauta. Having been chairman of the Public Service and Public Sector Reform Committee and a member of the Privileges Committee in his first term, he was a member of the Culture and Tourism Committee, Economics Committee and Public Works Committee in his second term. In November 2004, he caused controversy by briefly occupying the speaker's chair during a session in protest at Speaker Jeffrey Nape's frustration of attempts to bring a no-confidence vote in the government. He refused to apologise, and was suspended for two days for defying the Speaker.

In November 2005, the Parliamentary Privileges Committee recommended his suspension for ninety days for "making the Speaker's chair an item of public ridicule" the previous year. In April 2006, he was suspended from office pending a leadership tribunal into separate misconduct charges relating to financial statements and acquittals. The leadership tribunal found him guilty on all nineteen misconduct counts in December 2006. The tribunal dismissed him from office in January 2007. The tribunal members publicly alleged that they had been subject to a bribe attempt to rule in Benjamin's favour, although Benjamin denied responsibility.

== Election as Governor and third term ==
Benjamin staged a comeback at the 2012 election, defeating Governor Michael Sapau in the Manus Provincial seat rather than recontesting his former open seat. He initially supported the reopening of the Australian Manus Regional Processing Centre, though insisted that Manus residents needed to receive more benefit than they had in its previous incarnation. In October, as it was due to reopen, he labelled the Australian government "arrogant" over its handling of negotiations, stating that he had been "left in the dark". He subsequently argued for the national government to block the deal, stating that a promised aid package had not eventuated and criticising the fast-tracking of operational contracts being granted to Australian firms without local consultation, instead of in partnership with local businesses. On 1 November, having obtained a commitment to AU$8 million in Australian aid, he declared that "Manusians as a whole welcomed the asylum seeker facility", citing opportunities for local residents and businesses.

Benjamin subsequently defended the detention centre against criticism from landowners and human rights advocates, claiming that it would benefit local people and stating that his government would "not be deterred by people raising negative opinions about the program". By September 2013, he was reported to be "no longer on speaking terms" with Manus Open MP Ronny Knight, who had been outspoken about what Knight viewed as insufficient local benefit as a result of the project. An Australian newspaper reported local accusations that Benjamin was "running scared" by "trying to balance the interests of [Prime Minister O'Neill] and the Manus community". In the same month, he lashed the Australian government over its political instability and demanded a new deal of up to AU$120 million to upgrade local infrastructure. In February 2014, during controversy over the murder of detainee Reza Berati, he claimed that no Manus residents were involved in the death and blamed detainees he claimed had been transferred from the Nauru Regional Processing Centre - though the Chief Migration Officer stated that no Manus detainees had in fact been transferred from Nauru. He also opposed resettling any refugees on Manus Island itself, stating that the "PNG Solution" had become unpopular on Manus Island "because it is not right that people resettle here when they want to go to Australia".

Benjamin continued to support the processing centre due to the jobs associated with the project, and in August 2014 claimed that residents "wanted it to stay" in the face of media reports that it might close. However, in October he was reported to have temporarily ordered that construction on new facilities cease in support of his demand that Australia renegotiate their assistance package with the provincial government. By 2015, he was expressing concern about social problems associated with the centre such as "instances of drunkenness, drug use and sexual relations with locals", both from detention centre staff and refugees. In December 2016, The New York Times reported that he was "indignant" about the centre, with Benjamin stating "It's just morally wrong to dump these people here and then say, 'Never Australia,'"..."Our understanding was we'd help a process and genuine refugees would move on, but no process exists" and expressing frustration at "endless wrangling with the Australian authorities" over infrastructure such as roads.

Benjamin was comfortably re-elected at the 2017 election.

National Parliament of Papua New Guinea
Preceded by Arnold Marsipal	Member for Manus Open; 1997–2007	Succeeded by Job Pomat
Preceded by Michael Sapau	Member for Manus Provincial; Governor of Manus Province; 2012–present	Incumbent
