= Bob Dadae =

Governor-General of Papua New Guinea since 2017

His Excellency Grand Chief Sir Bob Dadae GCL GCMG KStJ
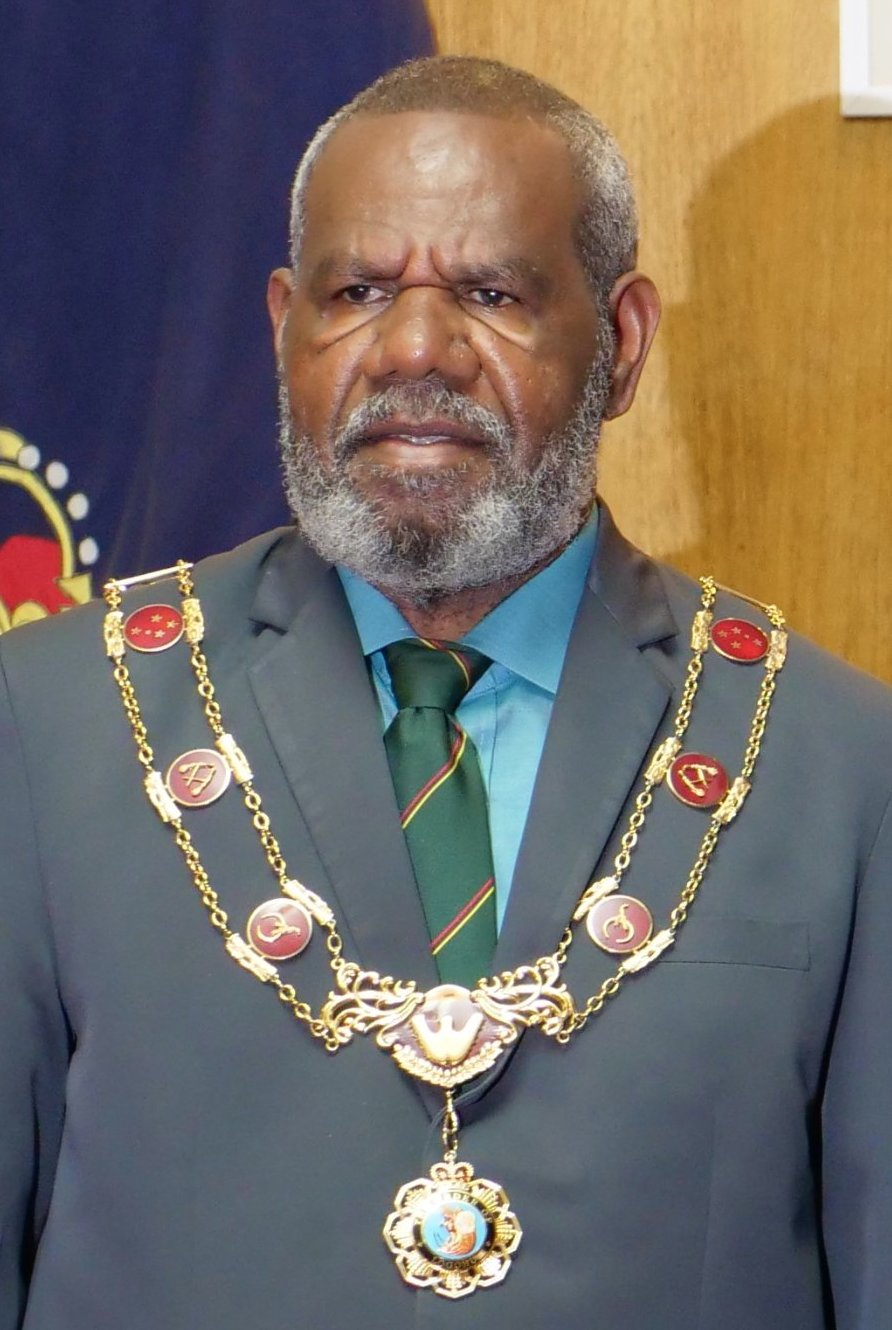
- Dadae in 2019

10th Governor-General of Papua New Guinea
- Incumbent
- Assumed office 28 February 2017
- Monarchs: Elizabeth II; Charles III
- Prime Minister: Peter O'Neill; James Marape
- Preceded by: Theo Zurenuoc (acting)

Personal details
- Born: 8 March 1961 (age 65) Morobe Province, Territory of Papua and New Guinea
- Party: United Party (until 2012); People's National Congress (2012–present)
- Spouses: Hannah Dadae (m. 1989; died 2018); Emeline Tufi Folau (m. 2020)
- Education: University of Papua New Guinea (BCom); Griffith University (MBA)

Sir Bob Bofeng Dadae GCL GCMG KStJ (born 8 March 1961) is a Papua New Guinean politician currently serving as the tenth governor-general of Papua New Guinea since 2017.

== Education and early career ==
Dadae was educated at the Ombo Lutheran Agency in Derim and the Bugandi High School, before completing a Bachelor of Commerce degree from the University of Papua New Guinea (1988) and Master of Business Administration degree from Griffith University (1995). Prior to his election to parliament, he was an accountant for the Evangelical Lutheran Church of Papua New Guinea and a board member of the Christian Press publishing house.

== Political career ==
Dadae was elected to the National Parliament of Papua New Guinea at the 2002 election as the United Party member for Kabwum Open, becoming the party's deputy leader after the election. He became Deputy Speaker in 2004. He was then re-elected at the 2007 election, and served as Minister for Defence under Michael Somare from 2007 to 2011. He crossed to the People's National Congress after Somare's 2011 ouster, and was re-elected under that banner at the 2012 election.

== Governor-General of Papua New Guinea ==
Dadae assumed office as the tenth governor-general of Papua New Guinea on 28 February 2017, succeeding Michael Ogio.

He was appointed to the Order of St Michael and St George on 5 May 2017. He was appointed to the Order of St John on 18 August 2017.

Dadae was nominated to run for a second term as Governor-General in December 2022 alongside Winnie Kiap and Stephen Pokawin. Dadae won the election and retained his viceregal position and was sworn in on 16 March 2023.

== Personal life ==
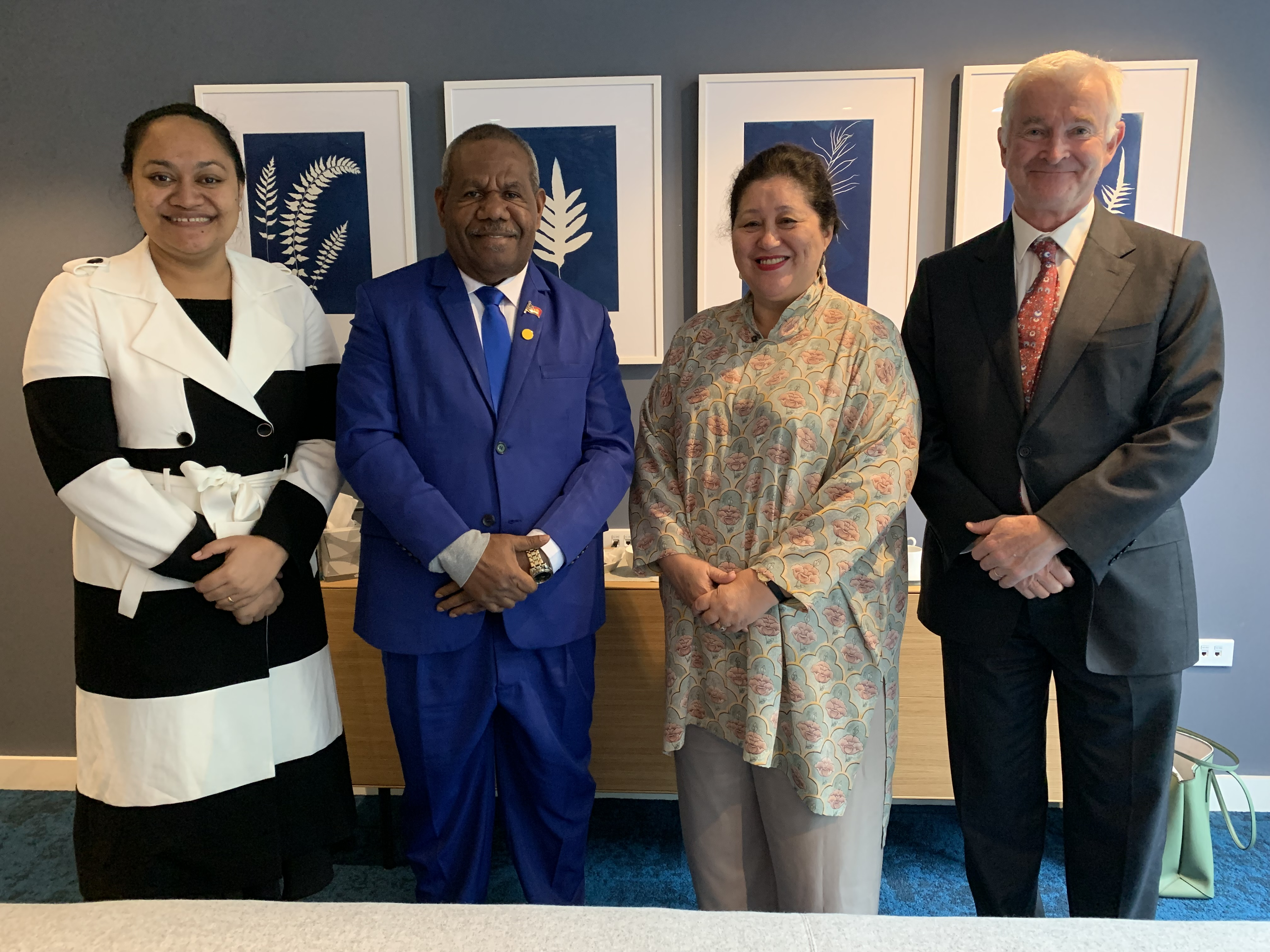
Sir Bob and Lady Dadae with Dame Cindy Kiro, Governor-General of New Zealand and Richard Davies, in London, 2022

Dadae married Hannah Dadae on 14 January 1989, and they had five children. Lady Dadae died from a short illness on 4 December 2018 in Brisbane, Australia.

Bob Dadae married Emeline Tufi Folau, a Tongan woman, on 11 January 2020.

Government offices
Preceded by Theo Zurenuoc (acting)	Governor General of Papua New Guinea; 2017–present	Incumbent
