= Peter Ipatas =

Papua New Guinean politician

The Right Honourable Chief Sir Peter Ipatas KBE GCL MP
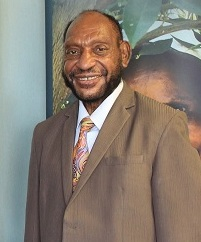
- Ipatas in 2021

Governor of Enga Province
- Incumbent
- Assumed office 28 June 1996
- Preceded by: Jeffery Balakau

Personal details
- Born: Irelya Village, Wabag, Enga Province, Territory of New Guinea (now Papua New Guinea)
- Party: People's Party
- Education: University of Papua New Guinea (Never Graduated)

The Right Honourable Chief Sir Peter Ipatas, KBE, GCL, MP (born 31 July 1958) is a Papua New Guinean politician and businessman, and is the current governor of Enga province. Ipatas has been re-elected to the parliament for six consecutive terms since 1997. He is commonly known throughout the country as the "Action Governor". Chief Ipatas is also known as the Father of Free Education Policy in the country. He first assumed office in 1997.

Ipatas was the Parliamentary leader of the People's Party which was founded by himself in 2006 after he left the Papua New Guinea Party.

== Early life ==
Ipatas was born 21 July 1958, and raised in Irelya village in Wabag District, Enga Province.

== Education ==
He was educated at Ireyla Community School close to local residence. Ipatas then moved to further his Secondary Education at Pausa Lutheran High School in Wapenamanda District in the same province. After completing his secondary education in his home province, he was selected to do Science Foundation Year at the University of Papua New Guinea.

== Political life and Parliamentary Services ==
=== Current ===
Currently, Chief Ipatas is the Governor of Enga Province. He is a senior member in the Marape-Rosso government. He is the Chairman of Constitutional Laws, Acts and Subordinate Legislations, Deputy Chairman of Pensions and Retirement Benefits, and a member of the Public Sector Reform and Service Delivery Parliament Committees.

=== Previously ===
Ipatas was first elected to the 6th National Parliament in the 1997 General Elections for the Enga Provincial seat. He was a member of Broadcasting of Parliamentary Proceedings Committee from July 1997 to March 1998. He was also member of Finance Referral Committee from July 1997 – July 1998. Chief Ipatas was Governor for Enga Province from July 1997 until the withdrawal of Enga Provincial Government powers in February 2001. At that time, he also served in the Public Works Committee from November 1999 to May 2001, and in the Select Committee on Independent Commission Against Corruption in April 1998.

Ipatas was appointed Minister for Mining by then Prime Minister of Papua New Guinea, Sir Mekere Morauta government on 17 May 2001 till 19 October 2001 when relinquished ministerial duties to resume as Governor for Enga Province when the suspension of the Enga Provincial government was lifted. During the suspension. Ipatas fought vigorously and had his government reinstated, serving a full term until the 2002 national elections which he won easily. The people hailed him as a hero and gave him the nickname ‘Action Governor’ which has struck with him since.

On 26 April 2001, Ipatas quit the United Resources Party to join ranks with the People's Democratic Movement Party led by Paias Wingti. Ipatas was re-elected to the 7th National Parliament for the same seat in the 2002 National General Elections as a People's Democratic Movement Candidate. He then joined then joined Papua New Guinea Party when party name changed from PDM to PNG Party in November 2003.

Sir Peter announced his resignation from PNG Party to form his own party, People's Party, on 1 January 2006. After the party was formed, Ipatas was subsequently made the first Parliamentary Leader in May 2007 before the 2007 National General Elections. When the 2007 elections came, the people saw Ipatas as a visionary leader and returned him for a record third term. Chief Ipatas was again elected to the 8th National Parliament for the same seat as a People's Party candidate. 'Ipatas was proving to be a king maker and a good man to have on side when he joined Grand Chief Sir Michael Somare as a coalition partner and proved to be the antidote Somare needed to hold together his 27 members and so neutralise an uprising from within the National Alliance'.

Ipatas was re-elected to the 9th National Parliament in the 2012 National General Elections for the same seat under the same party.

== Honours ==
Ipatas was awarded the Most Excellent Order of the British Empire, the "order of chivalry of British constitutional monarchy" which is rewarded to contributions to arts and sciences, work with charitable and welfare organisations, and public service outside the Civil Service. He received the most senior title of which made him a knight. In 2015, Ipatas was knighted in the 2015 Queen's Birthday Honours list for services to the community in the fields of health, education and vocational training.

Ipatas was also awarded the Grand Companion of the Order of Logohu, the highest class, Grand Companion of the Order of Logohu which may be awarded to citizens of Papua New Guinea and others for service, achievement, and merit in the highest degree, sustained over a period of twenty years. This class may be awarded to no more than 50 living citizens where recipients are titled as Chief. Chancellor of the Order is titled Grand Chief who were Grand Chief Sir Michael Somare and Grand Chief Sir Paulias Matane, who were former Prime Minister and former Governor-General of Papua New Guinea respectively.
