= Chris Haiveta =

Papua New Guinean politician

Sir Christopher Seseve Haiveta KCMG (born 20 September 1959) is a Papua New Guinean politician.

He was the head of the Pangu Party of Papua New Guinea and a member of National Parliament. In 1993 he was named Deputy Prime Minister of Papua New Guinea. He was appointed Leader of the Opposition from August 1993 to September 1994.

Haiveta served as Minister of Finance in the government of Julius Chan from 1994 to 1997. They both resigned in 1997 during the Sandline Affair. Soon after that, Haiveta briefly became foreign minister but had left that post by the end of 1997. He became governor of Gulf Province for the first time in 1997, lost that post in 1998 and became governor again in 2002. He lost the election July 2007, and left the governorship later that year after the parliamentary elections. He worked for the Prime Minister's department following his election loss in 2007.

He also served as the governor of Gulf Province twice. In 2017 he was elected as Governor of Gulf Province for the 3rd time. He was appointed Knight Commander of the Order of St Michael and St George (KCMG) in the 2023 King's Birthday Honours for "Political and Public Service".

Political offices
Preceded by Julius Chan	Deputy Prime Minister of Papua New Guinea; 1994–1997	Succeeded by Michael Nali
