= Allan Bird =

American academic

Allan Bird (born 1953) is a university professor and holds the Darla and Frederick Brodsky Trustee Professor in Global Business at Northeastern University. He is an author of numerous scholarly works in the areas of global leadership and international human resource management that, according to Google Scholar has 4651 citations bringing his h-index to 33 and his ¡10-index to 56.
