= Sasindran Muthuvel =

Papua New Guinean politician of Indian origin

The Honourable Sasindran Muthuvel
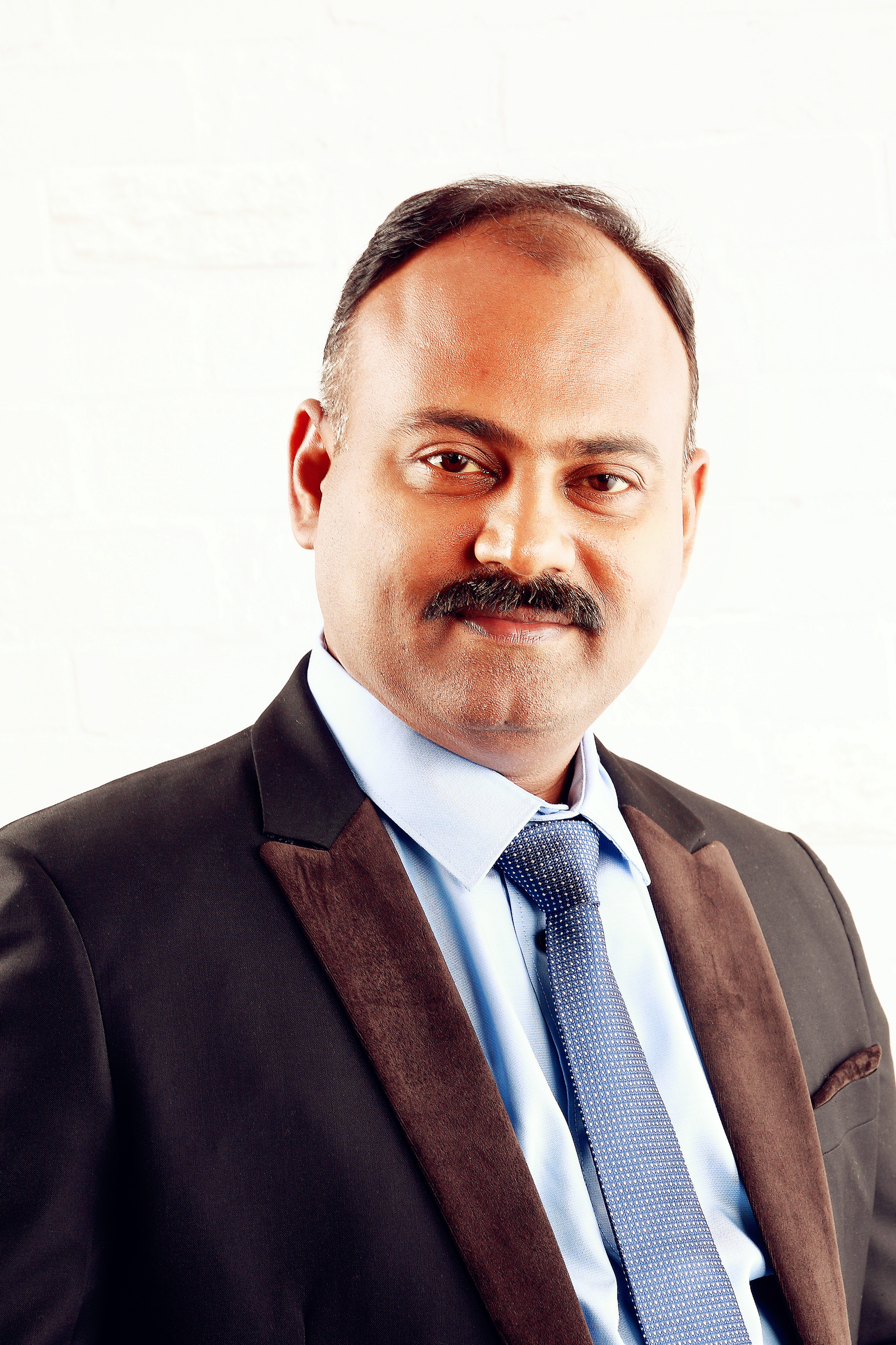
- Born: 5 December 1974 (age 51); Sivakasi, Tamil Nadu, India
- Occupations: Politician, businessman
- Years active: 2012–present
- Known for: Governor of West New Britain Province
- Spouse: Subha Abarna Sasindran (m. 1998)
- Children: Shyam Sasindran, Lalitha Sasindran
- Awards: Padma Shri (2024); Pravasi Bharatiya Samman (2014)

Sasindran Muthuvel (born 5 December 1974) is an Indian-origin Papua New Guinean politician and businessman, currently serving as the Governor of West New Britain Province. He previously served as the Minister for State-Owned Enterprises in the national government.

== Early life and background ==
Muthuvel was born in Sivakasi, Tamil Nadu, India, and migrated to Papua New Guinea, where he established a successful business career before entering politics. He was the Managing Director of Hamamas Trading Ltd, a retail chain operating in West New Britain Province.

== Political career ==
In 2012, Muthuvel was elected to the National Parliament of Papua New Guinea, becoming the first person of Indian origin to do so. He was appointed Governor of West New Britain Province and has since held various portfolios in the provincial and national governments, including as Minister for State-Owned Enterprises.

In his role as Governor, Muthuvel has advocated for infrastructure development, transparency in public funding, and disaster response mechanisms. He has been vocal in calling for equitable development and financial reforms in PNG’s public sector.

== Recognition ==
Muthuvel was honoured as Chief "Swara" by the Central Nakanai clan in West New Britain Province. In 2014, he received the Pravasi Bharatiya Samman from the President of India Pranab Kumar Mukherjee for his contributions to public service and for strengthening India - PNG relations.

In 2024, he was conferred the Padma Shri, India’s fourth-highest civilian award, in the field of public affairs.

== See also ==
- India–Papua New Guinea relations
