= Gary Juffa =

Papua New Guinean politician

The Honourable Gary Victor Juffa MP
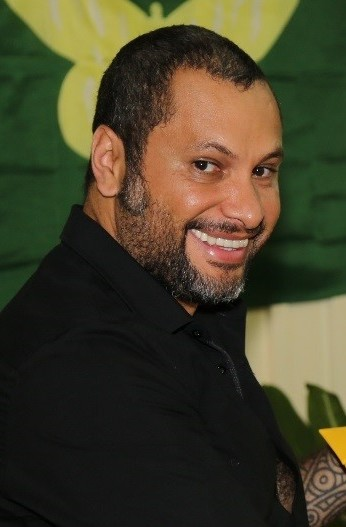

Governor of Oro Province

Member of the National Parliament of Papua New Guinea
- Incumbent
- Assumed office July 2012
- Preceded by: Suckling Tamanabae
- Constituency: Oro Province

Personal details
- Born: February 1972 (age 53–54) Papua New Guinea
- Party: People's Movement for Change
- Education: University of Papua New Guinea

Gary Juffa is a Papua New Guinea politician and Member of the 10th Parliament of Papua New Guinea. He founded the People's Movement for Change party, of which he is the sole Member of Parliament. He was first elected to the 9th Parliament of Papua New Guinea as the Governor of Oro Province (also known as Northern Province) in July 2012.

== Early life and education ==
Juffa has written of his childhood, where he accompanied his mother, who was a family planning coordinator, as she traveled around Papua New Guinea for employment. He lived across the country and attended a number of schools, but spent a formative period of time in Kokoda with his grandparents. He attended University of Papua New Guinea.

== Career ==
Juffa entered the public service, joining the PNG Customs Department. He rose through the ranks to become Commissioner of Customs. He resigned in 2011 and ran successfully for Parliament as Governor of Oro Province in 2012. He was re-elected in 2017.

Juffa is an outspoken opponent of logging activity in his home province and across the country. In March 2018, Juffa led a shut down of controversial logging operations at Collingwood Bay, seizing equipment and arresting allegedly illegal workers. He has repeatedly called for action against illegal logging on customary land in Parliament.

Juffa is also an outspoken supporter of the Free Papua Movement. Websites and social media supporting Indonesia's occupation of West Papua have targeted Juffa, and claim Papua New Guinea's record on corruption suggests independence for West Papua would create a future that "is nothing than bleak" [sic].

Juffa is vehemently opposed to the removal of World War II relics from Papua New Guinea. He believes that relics already removed, such as the B-17 Bomber Swamp Ghost, should be returned to the country.

== Blogs and writing ==
Juffa maintains a Facebook, Twitter and Instagram presence and is active on social media.
