= William Tongamp =

Papua New Guinean politician

Dr. William Tongamp (born 23 November 1973) is a member of parliament in Papua New Guinea. He won the governor seat of Papua New Guinea's Jiwaka Province in 2012 General Elections. Prior to that he was an Association Professor and Postdoctoral research fellow at Akita University in Japan after completing his PhD in Mineral Processing in Tohoku University in Japan.

Tongamp, while a Postdoctoral Research fellow published several articles, with other research fellows, in Mineral and Chemical engineering and Hydrometallurgy, Mechanochemical Route for Synthesizing Nitrate Form of Layered Double Hydroxide, Precipitation of arsenic as Na 3AsS 4 from Cu 3AsS 4–NaHS–NaOH leach solutions, A Mechanochemical Approach to Generate Hydrogen for Cellulose, Generation of hydrogen from polyvinyl chloride by milling and heating with CaO and Ni(OH)2 and several others.

He left Japan in 2011 to contest for elections in Papua New Guinea which he won the governor seat and to this day he is a member of parliament.
