= Gulf Province =

Province in Papua New Guinea

Gulf Province Galf Provins (Tok Pisin)
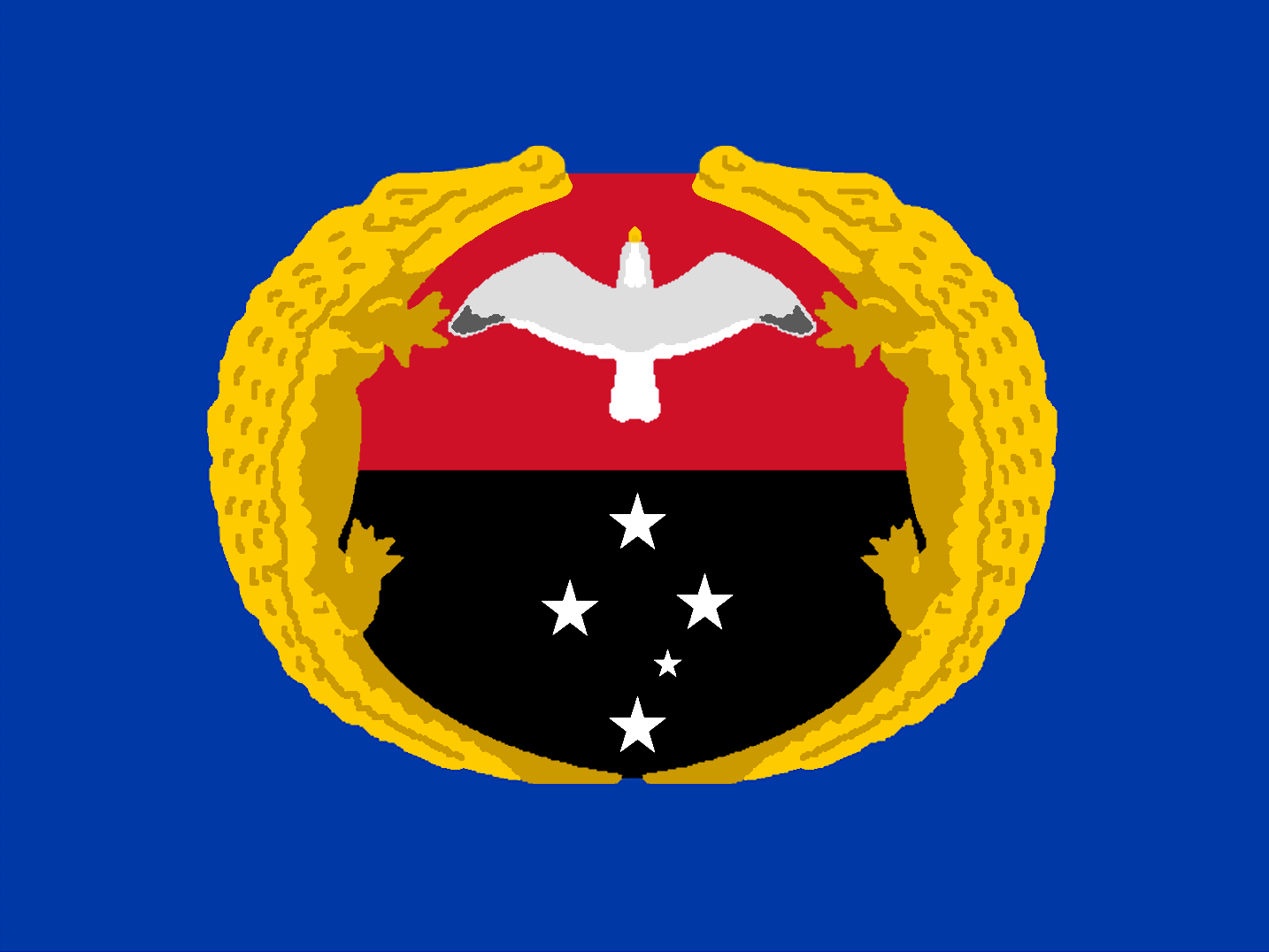
- Flag

- Gulf Province in Papua New Guinea

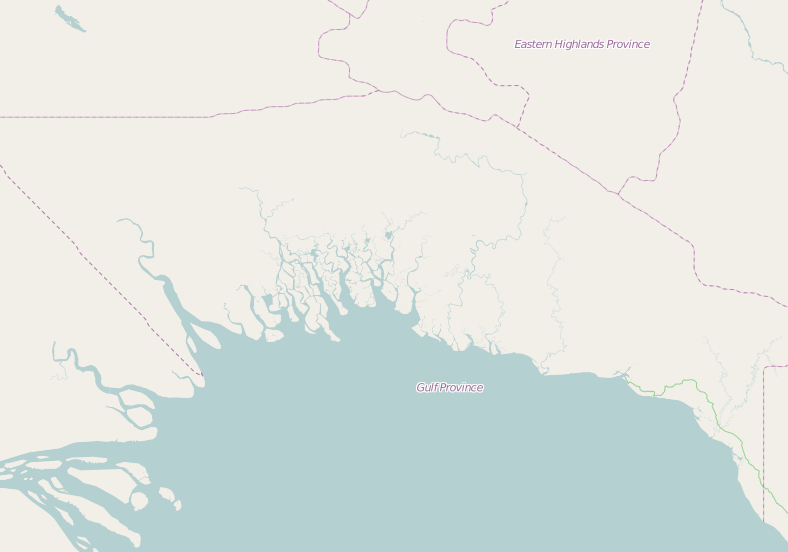
- Location within Gulf Province
- Coordinates: 7°20′S 145°0′E
- Country: Papua New Guinea
- Capital: Kerema
- Districts: List: Kerema District; Kikori District

Government
  - Governor: Chris Haiveta 2017-current

Area
  - Total: 34,472 km^{2} (13,310 sq mi)

Population (2011 census)
  - Total: 158,197
  - Density: 4.5891/km^{2} (11.886/sq mi)
- Time zone: UTC+10 (AEST)
- HDI (2018): 0.510 low · 19th of 22

Gulf Province is a province of Papua New Guinea located on the southern coast. The provincial capital is Kerema. The 34,472 km^{2} province is dominated by mountains, lowland river deltas, and grassland flood plains. In Gulf Province, the Kikori, Turama, Purari, and Vailala rivers meet the Papuan Gulf. The province has the second-smallest population of all the provinces of Papua New Guinea with 106,898 inhabitants (2000 census). The province shares land borders with Western Province to the west, Southern Highlands, Chimbu, and Eastern Highlands to the north, Morobe Province to the east, and Central Province to the southeast.

== Districts and LLGs ==
Each province in Papua New Guinea has one or more districts, and each district has one or more Local Level Government (LLG) areas. For census purposes, the LLG areas are subdivided into wards and those into census units.

District	District Capital	LLG Name
Kerema District	Kerema	Central Kerema Rural
Kerema District	Kerema	East Kerema Rural
Kerema District	Kerema	Kaintiba Rural
Kerema District	Kerema	Kerema Urban
Kerema District	Kerema	Kotidanga Rural
Kerema District	Kerema	Lakekamu-Tauri Rural
Kikori District	Kikori	Baimuru Rural
Kikori District	Kikori	East Kikori Rural
Kikori District	Kikori	Ihu Rural
Kikori District	Kikori	West Kikori Rural

== Provincial leaders ==
The province was governed by a decentralised provincial administration, headed by a Premier, from 1978 to 1995. Following reforms taking effect that year, the national government reassumed some powers, and the role of Premier was replaced by a position of Governor, to be held by the winner of the province-wide seat in the National Parliament of Papua New Guinea.

=== Premiers (1978–1995) ===
Premier	Term
Ope Oeake	1978–1979
Sepoe Karava	1980–1985
Francis Malaisa	1985–1987
Tom Koraea	1987–1989
Sepoe Karava	1990–1992
Paul Apio	1992–1993
provincial government suspended	1993–1995

=== Governors (1995–present) ===
Governor	Term
Tom Koraea	1995–1997
Chris Haiveta	1997–1998
Riddler Kimave	1998–2002
Chris Haiveta	2002–2007
Havila Kavo	2007–2017
Chris Haiveta	2017–present

== Members of the National Parliament ==
The province and each district is represented by a Member of the National Parliament. There is one provincial electorate and each district is an open electorate.

Electorate	Member
Gulf Provincial	Chris Haiveta
Kerema Open	Thomas Opa
Kikori Open	Soroi Marepo Eoe
