= List of Port Moresby suburbs =

This is a list of the suburbs of Port Moresby, the capital city of Papua New Guinea.

- Badili
- Baruni
- Bomana
- Boroko
- Dogura
- Ela Beach
- Ensisi Valley
- Erima
- Gabi
- Gabutu
- Gereka
- Gerehu
- Gordon
- Gordon North
- Hanuabada
- Hohola
- Hohola North
- Jacksons International Airport
- Kaevaga
- Kaugere
- Kila Kila
- Koki
- Konedobu
- Korobosea
- Matirogo
- Moitaka
- Morata
- Newtown
- Pari
- Sabama
- Saraga
- Tatana
- Taurama
- Tokarara
- Touaguba Hill
- Vabukori
- Waigani
- 2 Mile
- 3 Mile
- 4 Mile
- 6 Mile
- 9 Mile
