= List of schools in Port Moresby =

This is a list of schools in Port Moresby, the capital of Papua New Guinea.

Papua New Guinea's education system is divided into two sections: the international school system, which is administered by the International Education Agency and offers a standard of education based on Australian or British school systems or the International Baccalaureate; and the national school system, which consists of elementary (K–2), primary (3–8) and secondary (9–12) schools. Competitive examinations are held in year 10 for entry into the country's four national high schools, of which one is located in Port Moresby.

Port Moresby is internally divided into wards or town areas. They are:

- Town/Hanuabada — along the west coast, including the CBD
- Tokarara/Hohola — northeast of the CBD
- Kila Kila/Kaugere — along the south coast
- Boroko/Korobosea — centred on Boroko east of the CBD
- Gordons/Saraga — eastern suburbs, north of Boroko
- Waigani/University — northern suburbs
- Gerehu — outer northern suburbs
- Bomana — north-eastern townships beyond the metropolitan area

== Elementary and primary schools ==
Name	Suburb Hohola 1	Ward	Operator	Info	Notes
Paradise High School	Boroko			Info	
Baruni Elementary School	Baruni	Town/Hanuabada		Info	
Bavaroko Primary School	Boroko	Boroko/Korobosea		Info	
Bomana Elementary School	Bomana	Bomana		Info	
Bomana Primary School	Bomana	Bomana		Info	
Boreboa Elementary School	Waigani	Waigani/University		Info	
Boreboa Primary School	Waigani	Waigani/University		Info	
Butuka Elementary School	Gabutu	Kila Kila/Kaugere		Info	
Butuka Primary School	Six Mile	Kila Kila/Kaugere		Info	
Carr Memorial Elementary School	Ensisi Valley	Waigani/University	7DA	Info	
Carr Memorial Primary School	Ensisi Valley	Waigani/University		Info	
Coronation Elementary School	Boroko	Boroko/Korobosea		Info	
Coronation Primary School	Boroko	Boroko/Korobosea		Info	
Daugo Elementary School	Daugo Island	Town/Hanuabada		Info	
Daugo Primary School	Daugo Island	Town/Hanuabada		Info	
Eki Vaki Elementary School	Hohola	Tokarara/Hohola		Info	
Eki Vaki Primary School	Hohola	Tokarara/Hohola		Info	
Emmanuel Lutheran Elementary School	Gerehu	Gerehu	Lutheran	Info	
Evedahana Elementary School	Nine Mile	Bomana		Info	
Evedahana Primary School	Nine Mile	Bomana		Info	
Garden Foursquare Elementary School		Town/Hanuabada	Others	Info	
Gerehu Elementary School	Gerehu	Gerehu		Info	
Gerehu Primary School	Gerehu	Gerehu		Info	
Hagara Elementary School	Gabi	Town/Hanuabada		Info	
Hagara Primary School	Gabi	Town/Hanuabada		Info	
Hohola Demonstration Elementary School	Hohola	Tokarara/Hohola		Info	
Hohola Demonstration Primary School	Hohola	Tokarara/Hohola		Info	
Holy Rosary Elementary School	Saraga	Gordons/Saraga	Catholic	Info	
Holy Rosary Primary School	Saraga	Gordons/Saraga	Catholic	Info	
June Valley Elementary School	Tokarara	Tokarara/Hohola		Info	
June Valley Primary School	Tokarara	Tokarara/Hohola		Info	
Kaugere Elementary School	Kaugere	Kila Kila/Kaugere		Info	
Kaugere Primary School	Kaugere	Kila Kila/Kaugere		Info	
Kay Community School	Waigani	Waigani/University		Info	
Kay Elementary School	Waigani	Waigani/University		Info	
Kila Kila Primary School	Kila Kila	Kila Kila/Kaugere		Info	
Kilakila Elementary School	Kila Kila	Kila Kila/Kaugere		Info	
Koki Elementary School	Koki	Kila Kila/Kaugere		Info	
Koki Primary School	Koki	Kila Kila/Kaugere		Info	
Kopkop College	Gerehu	Kopkop /Gerehu			
Moitaka Elementary School	Moitaka	Bomana		Info	
Moitaka Primary School	Moitaka	Bomana		Info	
Morata Elementary School	Morata	Waigani/University		Info	
Morata Primary School	Morata	Waigani/University		Info	
New Erima Elementary School	Erima	Gordons/Saraga		Info	
New Erima Primary School	Erima	Gordons/Saraga		Info	
Nine Mile Quarry Elementary School	Nine Mile	Bomana		Info	
Noblet Elementary School	Waigani	Waigani/University		Info	
Noblet Primary School	Waigani	Waigani/University	Catholic	Info	
Ororo Elementary School	Tokarara	Tokarara/Hohola		Info	
Ororo Primary School	Tokarara	Tokarara/Hohola		Info	
Pari Elementary School	Pari	Kila Kila/Kaugere		Info	
Pari Primary School	Pari	Kila Kila/Kaugere		Info	
Peter To Rot Elementary School			Catholic	Info	
Philip Aravure Elementary School	Gerehu	Gerehu		Info	
Philip Aravure Primary School	Gerehu	Gerehu		Info	
Red Cross Special Education Elementary School	Hohola	Tokarara/Hohola	Others	Info	
Sacred Heart Elementary School	Hohola	Tokarara/Hohola	Catholic	Info	
Sacred Heart Primary School	Hohola	Tokarara/Hohola	Catholic	Info	
Salvation Army Boroko	Four Mile	Boroko/Korobosea	Others	Info	
Sevese Morea Elementary School	Gabutu	Kila Kila/Kaugere		Info	
Sevese Morea Primary School	Gabutu	Kila Kila/Kaugere		Info	
St Francis Primary School	Koki	Kila Kila/Kaugere	Anglican	Info	
St Johns Tokarara Primary School	Tokarara	Tokarara/Hohola	Catholic	Info	
St Michael's Elementary School	Hanuabada	Town/Hanuabada		Info	
St Michael's Primary School	Hanuabada	Town/Hanuabada	Catholic	Info	Established 1925
St Pauls Elementary School	Gerehu	Gerehu	Catholic	Info	
St Peter Chanel Elementary School	Erima	Gordons/Saraga	Catholic	Info	
St Peter Chanel Primary School	Erima	Gordons/Saraga	Catholic	Info	
St Therese Badili Primary School	Badili	Kila Kila/Kaugere	Catholic	Info	Established 1928
St Therese Elementary School	Koki	Kila Kila/Kaugere	Catholic	Info	
St. Johns Elementary School	Gerehu	Gerehu	Catholic	Info	
St. Pauls Primary School	Gerehu	Gerehu	Catholic	Info	
Tatana Elementary School	Tatana	Town/Hanuabada		Info	
Tatana Primary School	Tatana	Town/Hanuabada		Info	
Taurama Elementary School	Taurama	Boroko/Korobosea		Info	
Taurama Primary School	Taurama	Boroko/Korobosea		Info	
Ted Diro Elementary School	Hohola	Tokarara/Hohola		Info	
Ted Diro Primary School	Hohola	Tokarara/Hohola		Info	
Tengei Child Minding Pre-School	Tokarara	Tokarara/Hohola	7DA	Info	
Tokarara Elementary School	Tokarara	Tokarara/Hohola		Info	
Tokarara Primary School	Tokarara	Tokarara/Hohola		Info	
Waigani Elementary School	Waigani	Waigani/University		Info	
Waigani Primary School	Waigani	Waigani/University		Info	
Wardstrip Demonstration Elementary School	Gordon	Gordons/Saraga		Info	
Wardstrip Demonstration Primary School	Gordon	Gordons/Saraga		Info	

== Secondary schools ==
Name	Suburb	Ward	Operator	Info	Notes
Paradise High School	Boroko	East Boroko	Private	Info	Established in 2007
Badihagwa Secondary School	Kaevaga	Town/Hanuabada		Info	Established 1967
Caritas Technical Secondary School	Boroko	Boroko/Korobosea	Catholic	Info	
De La Salle Secondary School	Bomana	Bomana	Catholic	Info	De La Salle Brothers
Don Bosco Technical Secondary School	Kila Kila	Kila Kila/Kaugere	Catholic	Info	
Gerehu Secondary School	Gerehu	Gerehu		Info	Established 1982
Gordon Secondary School	Gordon	Gordons/Saraga		Info	
Grace Baptist Christian Academy	Gordon	Gordons/Saraga	Baptist		
Jubilee Catholic Secondary School	Hohola	Tokarara/Hohola	Catholic	Info	Established 2001. Operated by De La Salle Brothers
Kila Kila High School	Kila Kila	Kila Kila/Kaugere		Info	
Kopkop College	Gerehu	Gerehu	Others		Established 1980s
Marianville Secondary School	Bomana	Bomana	Catholic	Info	
Port Moresby National High School	Gerehu	Gerehu		Info	
St Charles Lwanga Secondary School	Gerehu	Gerehu	Catholic	Info	
Tokarara High School	Tokarara	Tokarara/Hohola		Info	

== Vocational centres ==
Name	Suburb	Ward	Operator	Info	Notes
Badili Vocational Centre	Badili	Kila Kila/Kaugere		Info	
IEA College of TAFE	Ela Beach	Town/Hanuabada	IEA	Website	
Koki Vocational Centre	Koki	Kila Kila/Kaugere		Info	
Limana Vocational Centre	Gordon North	Gordons/Saraga	Catholic	Info	
Maino Heduru Vocational Centre	Erima	Gordons/Saraga	Catholic	Info	
Morata Vocational Centre	Morata	Waigani/University		Info	

== International schools ==
Name	Suburb	Ward	Info	Notes
Birdwing Independent School	Boroko	Port Moresby	Website	Established 2009
Boroko East International School	Boroko	Boroko/Korobosea	Website	
Gordon International School	Gordon	Gordons/Saraga	Website	Established 1969
Korobosea International School	Korobosea	Boroko/Korobosea	Website	Established 1994
Ela Murray International School (Murray Campus)	Matirogo	Boroko/Korobosea	Website	Established 1966, amalgamated 2000
Ela Murray International School (Ela Campus)	Ela Beach	Town/Hanuabada	Website	Established 1911, amalgamated 2000
Paradise High School	Boroko	Boroko/Korobosea	Website	Established 2007.
Port Moresby Grammar School	Boroko	Boroko/Korobosea	Website	Independent.
Port Moresby International School	Boroko	Boroko/Korobosea	Website	Established 1960; ACT/IB curriculum
South Pacific International Academy	Motukea	Edai Town	Website	Established 2016; American Christian curriculum
St Joseph's International Catholic College	Boroko	Boroko/Korobosea	Website	Established 1917, moved from PM 1957. Independent.

== See also ==
- List of schools in Papua New Guinea
