= Igam Barrack Lae Base =

PNGDF Lae base

Igam Barrack Camp
- Lae Air Base
- Members of the Papua New Guinea (PNG) National Disaster Centre, PNG Port of Lae,
- Active: 1968 to Present
- Country: Papua New Guinea
- Equipment: Motors, Air base, Music band,

The Igam barrack Lae Base, the Air Base is the third air base in Papua New Guinea. It was opened by the then Minister of Defence, Mr. Philip. The base has served as the main training school for students.

== History ==
The base was built at a cost of $9 million. The Lae Area Headquarters, the Papua New Guinea Volunteer Rifle Division and the Papua Army Cadet School were the military units operating there. These included the Air Special Services Battalion and the 3rd Battalion. In 1960, three military bases were established according to the National Security Plan. However, the Port Moresby Taurama military base and the Moem military base in Wewak were created in the process. Then, in 1966, the construction of the Igam military base was started and was completed in 1968 with all the facilities. The Lae Area Company headquarters, the Papua New Guinea Volunteer Rifles Headquarters and the 35th Student Battalion Headquarters were created.

== See also ==
- Papua New Guinea Defence Force
- Taurama Barrack Camp
- Papua New Guinea
- Royal Pacific Islands Regiment
- Royal Pacific Islands Regiment Two

== Gallery ==
Bomb-damage-at-Japanese-at-Lae-New-Guinea

U.S. Air Force Lt. Col. Ryan Evans, Pacific Angel 19-4 mission commander, and Papua New Guinea Defense Force Lt. Col. Bruno Malau discuss PAC Angel 19-4 civic action project plans at Igam Base in Lae, Papua New Guinea, Sept. 6, 2019
