= Murray Barracks (Port Moresby) =

PNG Defense force

Coordinates: 9°28′10″S 147°10′55″E

Murray Barracks Port Moresby
- Headquarters Defence Force
- U.S. Army BG. Brion J. Aderman Commander of the Wisconsin Army National Guard gives remarks to U.S. Army Soldiers from the Wisconsin National Guard and Papua New Guinea Defence Force personnel participating in Exercise Tamiok Strike 2026 at Murray Barracks, Port Moresby, Papua New Guinea,
- Active: 1973 to Present
- Country: Papua New Guinea - Port Moresby

Murray Barracks serves as the headquarters for the Papua New Guinea Department of Defense. The Murray Barracks complex is responsible for the core functions of the defense establishment, including policy formulation and the acquisition of resources for finance and capacity building.

== History ==
Murray Barracks was established in 1966 as the command headquarters for Papua New Guinea. Its origins are rooted in the history of the Pacific Islands Regiment. The Papua New Guinea Area Command Headquarters, located at Murray Barracks, maintained a link with the Northern Command Headquarters. Between 1964 and 1966, combat and service support units were formed and operated at Murray Barracks, which subsequently became a headquarters facility. The force was later expanded to include the 1st Pacific Islands Regiment and the 2nd Pacific Islands Regiment. During this period, the Pacific Islands Regiment recruitment unit located at Goldie River was transformed into the Papua New Guinea Training Depot. After serving as a joint command headquarters, it was designated as the Papua New Guinea Defence Force Headquarters in January 1973.

== Gallery ==
Maj. Gen. Paul Knapp, Wisconsin’s adjutant general, and Brig. Gen. Matthew Strub, Wisconsin’s deputy adjutant general for Army, meet with Maj. Gen. Mark Goina of the Papua New Guinea Defence Force Dec. 1 at Murray Barracks in Port Moresby,

Papua New Guinea Defense Force soldiers assigned to the PNGDF ceremonial guard stand at attention on the parade field July 15, 2024, Murray Barracks,

U.S. Navy Cmdr. Greg Coates, the chaplain of Marine Rotational Force – Darwin 24.3, and Petty Officer 1st Class Nicholas Kless, a religious program specialist with MRF-D 24.3, speak with Papua New Guinea Defence Force religious leaders during a humanitarian assistance and disaster relief exercise at Murray Barracks,

Maj. Gen. Paul Knapp, Wisconsin’s adjutant general, presents a gift that describes 32nd “Red Arrow” Division World War II actions in Papua New Guinea to Maj. Gen. Mark Goina, chief of the Papua New Guinea Defence Force, during a Dec. 1 tour of Murray Barracks in Port Moresby,

== See also ==
- Papua New Guinea
- Papua New Guinea Defence Force
- Taurama Barrack Camp
- Royal Pacific Islands Regiment
- Royal Pacific Islands Regiment Two
