= Gordons Market =

Port Moresby, Markets and Retail shops

- Location: Gordons area, Port Moresby, Papua New Guinea; Gordons
- Goods sold: All type Vegetable, Fruits, All type of potato , grocery, nuts, bilum, house hole items, Sago,
- Days normally open: All Days
- Parking: Available

Gordons Market is the largest among the major produce markets located in the central part of the Gorton area. Vegetables and other produce from other provinces and foreign countries are sold here.

== History ==
The Gorton Market was built in the 1980s. It became a highly congested area plagued by flooding and a hotspot for crime. Vendors like Leo Daniel faced situations where goods—such as Mary-style blouses—were stolen, leaving them helpless to do anything about it.

== Restructuring ==
The long-awaited Gordons Market was officially opened in 2019, having been developed in a new format. This market redevelopment was carried out with the support of UN Women and the governments of Papua New Guinea and New Zealand. Prime Minister James Marape, Governor Powes Parkop, and New Zealand High Commissioner Philip Taula attended the market's opening ceremony. The market redevelopment initiative was undertaken after consulting hundreds of women and incorporating their feedback. The redeveloped market features adequate lighting, wide walkways, multiple entry points, information boards, and facilities designed to ensure convenience for staff, vendors, and customers. A specialized information technology system has been installed at the new Gordan's Market to facilitate fee collection, ensure reliability, increase revenue, and improve market management. Various training programs—covering areas such as food handling and hygiene—were conducted with the assistance of the Australian government. More than 500 female vendors participated in this training. Funded by the Australian government, the 'Safe Cities' initiative has been operating for eight years in collaboration with UN Women, the National Capital District Corporations, and various other partners. This initiative focuses on market-based projects, safe transport, and infrastructure improvements aimed at the well-being of women and girls across the city. The market redevelopment project is valued at 10 million US dollars. As a result of the changes to the new Gordons Market layout, vendors now feel much more secure. The presence of various safety features ensures they can move about and conduct sales freely. The market is equipped with a café, a playground, a food court, secure parking, CCTV surveillance, excellent lighting, and roofing that provides protection from the sun. One vendor remarked, "Working in the old market was difficult, but since the redevelopment, we are protected from the rain and sun, which brings us great happiness." Many traders believe that the redevelopment of Gordons Market has created an opportunity for them to meet their families' needs.

== Gallery ==
Gordons market ramp area

Gordons parking area

== See also ==
- Gordon, Papua New Guinea
- Port Moresby
- Papua New Guinea
