= Boroko Market Port Moresby =

Markets in Port Moresby

Coordinates: 9.4668°S 147.1983°E

Boroko Market
- Location: Boroko area; Port Moresby, Papua New Guinea
- Closing date: Sunday
- Environment: Tropical
- Goods sold: Bilum, handicrafts, souvenir, vegetables, all type fruits, All type of local vegetables, Sago, female Tops, other dresses
- Days normally open: Monday to Saturday
- Total retail floor area: Ground Area, and Open area
- Parking: Available
- Interactive map of Boroko Market

Boroko Market Port Moresby is a large market located in the heart of Port Moresby, Papua New Guinea. It serves as a commercial hub where people sell their handicrafts and souvenirs and vegetables.

== History ==
In the late 1940s, was purchased by the Australian government as a housing estate for foreign workers. Later, more housing was built, and a large suburban development project was developed in Port Moresby. After World War II, the Australian Labor government announced a number of initiatives for economic and social development through the New Deal. A large amount of money was to be spent. This included the construction of the Boroko Drainage and the importation of one hundred prefabricated aluminum houses. The area chosen was Boroko Drive. The Boroko Market, which is located between residential areas and includes a sports and entertainment complex, is a significant commercial center.

== Origin of the name ==
'Boroko' is the name of a specific type of tree—specifically, the 'gum tree'. In the past, the entire area was surrounded by trees of this kind.

== Location ==
The area features a large number of small and large shops, schools, sports facilities, and a commercial market. For those seeking a suitable place to live, key factors include affordability, convenient transportation, safety, diversity, and aesthetic appeal.

== Commerce and retail ==
Boroko reflects the ethnic diversity of Port Moresby, encompassing indigenous Motu - Koita coastal groups, settlers from the highlands, small expatriate communities, and people of various other ethnicities from across the city. The suburb attracts professionals and civil servants to its formal residential areas, while also hosting informal settlements for low-income families. Urban areas like Boroko generally boast higher literacy rates than the national average, thanks to superior access to education. Small-scale farmers from the surrounding rural areas come to this market to sell their produce and a variety of handicrafts. The Boroko Night Market, held weekly on Wednesdays from 5:00 PM to 10:00 PM, features local vendors selling fresh produce, handicrafts, and "Meri blouses" (traditional-style dresses). Women play a pivotal role here. Boroko’s commercial and retail zones are designed to support local livelihoods. The National Football Stadium is located near the market; here, hundreds of vendors from nearby areas like Sogeri and Magi sell fruits, vegetables, and other local goods from organized stalls. This market operates from Monday to Saturday, between 7:30 AM and 5:00 PM. In the immediate vicinity of the market, one finds the Boroko police station, as well as commercial complexes, supermarkets like "Stop & Shop," banks, and small businesses providing essential goods and financial services to residents. These establishments, clustered near key locations such as fire stations, provide employment to thousands of local residents in roles ranging from sales to administration. Meanwhile, a digital banking center—serving Kina Bank and Pacific Bank—has been opened near the Boroko Post Office. Recent advancements in digital transaction integration have modernized the way transactions are conducted.

== Gallery ==
boroko market back entrance

== See also ==
- Boroko
- Port Moresby
- Papua New Guinea
