= Avia Koisen =

Papua New Guinean lawyer

- Born: Port Moresby, Papua New Guinea
- Education: University of Papua New Guinea (LL.B.); Queensland University of Technology (LL.M.)
- Occupation: Lawyer

Avia Koisen is a lawyer from Papua New Guinea who runs her own law firm. She was a founder member of Papua New Guinea Women in Chamber of Commerce and Industry (PNGWCCI) and has been its president. She is a campaigner against gender-based violence in the country.

== Early life ==
Avia Ta'ita Koisen was born in PNG's capital, Port Moresby, into a fairly poor family. Her mother worked as a maid and her father did odd jobs, between them earning enough for Koisen and her siblings to attend school. However, after she completed school, they told her that she should marry and that they had chosen a husband for her. Avia left home and joined a nursing school where a teacher, recognising her ability, encouraged her to go to university. She obtained a Bachelor of Law Degree from the University of Papua New Guinea in Port Moresby, having her first child while at university, and a Masters in Law from the Queensland University of Technology in Brisbane, Australia, in 1996–1997, with the help of an Australian Development Scholarship.

== Career ==
Koisen established her own law company, called Koisen Lawyers, working mainly in civil law, with emphasis on banking, general litigation, commercial law, property law, and family law. She has been admitted to practice at the National Court and the Supreme Court of Papua New Guinea.

Koisen was a founder-member of Papua New Guinea Women in Chamber of Commerce and Industry (PNGWCCI), which argues that policy for PNG's small and medium-sized enterprises (SME) is not conducive to women entrepreneurs to open up businesses and continue their operations successfully and has been campaigning for changes in rules and practices. To encourage women to take their businesses to a higher level, the group has been arguing for more training programmes and for government-initiated policies that will support women's businesses. The group has provided training on topics such as saving, registering a company, and turning a hobby into a business. PNGWCCI, which has 5000 members, has also called on the government to give greater recognition to the problem of gender-based violence.

Koisen was a member of the team that developed the Papua New Guinea Vision 2050, which was launched in November 2009. She has been a director on the Media Development Initiative Board and a director of Port Moresby International School. Koisen is a member of the board of Telikom PNG. She has been president of the executive committee of the Papua New Guinea Australian Alumni Association, which draws its members from Papua New Guineans who have studied in Australia. Her other roles include being a member of the board of Kumul Telikom, and, before that, of PNG Dataco Ltd, a state-owned enterprise that operated and managed a fibre optic network of over 7,000 kilometres (4,300 mi).
