= Three Mile, Papua New Guinea =

3 Mile
- Location within Papua New Guinea
- Coordinates: 9°28′30″S 147°11′3″E
- Country: Papua New Guinea
- Province: NCD
- City: Port Moresby
- Time zone: UTC+10 (AEST)

3 Mile is a residential suburb of Port Moresby, the capital city of Papua New Guinea. It is adjacent to Korobosea and The Port Moresby General Hospital is also inside this suburb.
