= Taurama =

Port Moresby places and areas

Taurama Port Moresby, Papua New Guinea

It is a suburb of Port Moresby, the capital of Papua New Guinea. As designated areas under the city's housing and urban development schemes have been exhausted, people have settled in the Taurama area on the city's outskirts.

== Location ==
This area has historically been a valley. Due to the city's growing population, the National Capital District Commission has expanded its urban development plan. Informal land transactions between landowners and settlers have been a common occurrence in the Taurama Valley. The Taurama Valley residential area and its surrounding regions comprise the current suburbs of Boroko, Korobosea, Gordons, 5 Mile, and 6 Mile. Taurama is situated in the southeastern part of Port Moresby. It extends from Pari Village and Taurama Bay in the southwest to the southern slopes of Mount Erima. The Taurama Barrack camp is located on this traditional land.

== See also ==
- Taurama Barrack Camp
- Port Moresby
