= Royal Pacific Islands Regiment Two =

Papua New Guinea, Moem Military camp

Royal Pacific islands Regiment Two
- Moem military base
- Security Assistance Training Management Organization (SATMO) Mobile Training Team (MTT) and the Papua New Guinea Defence Force (PNGDF) after graduating from the four-week Medical and Tactical Training Course
- Active: 1973 to present
- Country: Papua New Guinea
- Branch: Wewak

The Royal Pacific Islands Regiment Two (2RPIR) is an infantry regiment of the Papua New Guinea Defence Force (PNGDF). It was formed from the Australian Army in 1973.

== Location ==
Based at the Moem Military Base in Wewak, Papua New Guinea, the 2nd Battalion, Royal Pacific Island Regiment, is a well-equipped rifle company, a company with reconnaissance, signals, motor, mixed engineers, medics, and the regimental first aid station, and an administration company with a band, preventive medicine, transport, and military engineering elements. The 2nd Regiment is responsible for providing land border security with Indonesia in the Sandaun Province. It has a forward operating base at Vanimo and a forward patrol station at Wutung. It is also responsible for supporting the PNGDF's core missions of security, disaster management, civil emergency relief, nation building, and international missions.

== See also ==
- PNGDF
- Taurama barrack camp
- Papua New Guinea
- Wewak

== Galary ==
KOKOPO, Papua New Guinea Musician 3rd Class Steven LaMonica, from Dallas, with the Pacific Fleet Band, sings with members of the Royal Pacific Islands Regiment for students at the Kokopo Secondary School. The performance was part of a community outreach event during Pacific Partnership 2015.

amiok Strike strengthens bonds between Wisconsin Guard, Papua New Guinea

Wisconsin Infantry Training - Tamiok Strike
