= Four Mile, Papua New Guinea =

4 Mile
- Location within Papua New Guinea
- Coordinates: 9°27′45″S 147°11′32″E
- Country: Papua New Guinea
- Province: NCD
- City: Port Moresby
- Time zone: UTC+10 (AEST)
- Postcode: 131

4 Mile is an industrial area of Port Moresby, the capital city of Papua New Guinea, located just north of Boroko and south of Gordon.
