= St Joseph's International Catholic College =

Location
- Boroko, Port Moresby; Papua New Guinea; 9°28′1″S 147°12′15″E

Information
- Former name: St Joseph's School
- School type: Private international primary and secondary school
- Motto: Courage to Act
- Denomination: Catholicism
- Established: 1917 (109 years ago)
- Director: Fr. Paul Jennings
- Principal: George Swamy – Secondary; Hua Igo – Primary
- Years offered: Pre-Kindergarten – 12
- Enrolment: ~700
- Colours: Gold, brown, and white
- Nickname: Joeys
- Website: stjosephsinternational.ac.pg

St Joseph's International Catholic College, also known as Joeys, is a private Catholic international primary and secondary school, located in Boroko, Port Moresby, Papua New Guinea. The school provides education from pre-school age through all grades to year 12. Founded in 1917, the school is one of the oldest in Papua New Guinea and is located next to St Joseph's Parish Church.

== History ==
St Joseph's School was founded in 1917 as a school for the children of expatriates living in Port Moresby. Originally situated within the Convent of the Daughters of Our Lady of the Sacred Heart (OLSH) behind St. Mary's Cathedral, it started with only 15 pupils. Sister Mary Carthage was the first Head of School.

The school was closed between 1941 and 1946 because of the war. Enrollments rose steadily after the war and by the late 1950s the school's facilities had become too small to cater for the children's needs. The population around Boroko had grown and there was a need for a catholic school in the area so it was decided that St Joseph's would move to Boroko. The relocation took several years and was done in stages, starting with one class moving from Port Moresby to the Church Hall in Boroko in 1957. The OLSH sisters taught classes in the Hall while the new school was being built.

The school became St Joseph's International Catholic College after secondary school classes started in 2004. The first cohort of year 10 students sat for the PNG School Certificate, and NSW School Certificate, in 2007. The first cohort of year 12 students sat for the PNG Higher School Certificate, and NSW Higher School Certificate, in 2009.

== Academic and sporting program ==
The school holds an outstanding reputation in exam results. Since starting secondary school classes, the school has consistently topped the Port Moresby results for the year 8 public examinations and year 10 certificate index ratings. In previous years, when the former year 6 examinations were being conducted, high grades were also obtained.

The college participates in regular competitions for track and field athletics, swimming, basketball, and volleyball. An inter-school rugby union competition for the National Capital District was started in 2013, with St Joseph's fielding teams in the grand final matches of all three divisions – U14 and U17 male, and U17 female.

== Notable alumni ==
- Duncan McMeekin – a justice of the Supreme Court of Queensland

== See also ==
- Catholic Church in Papua New Guinea
- Education in Papua New Guinea
- List of international schools
- List of schools in Papua New Guinea
