= Badileyan =

Badileyan بديليان
- Village
- Location within Iran
- Coordinates: 32°09′21″N 48°33′48″E
- Country: Iran
- Province: Khuzestan
- County: Dezful
- Bakhsh: Choghamish
- Rural District: Kheybar

Population (2006)
  - Total: 400
- Time zone: UTC+3:30 (IRST)
  - Summer (DST): UTC+4:30 (IRDT)

Badileyan (Persian: بديليان, also Romanized as Badīleyān and Badīlīān; also known as Badīlī and Shahrak-e Badīlīān) is a village in Kheybar Rural District, Choghamish District, Dezful County, Khuzestan Province, Iran. At the 2006 census, its population was 400, in 75 families.
