= Taurama Barrack Camp =

PNG military camp

Taurama Barrack camp

- Port Moreby, Papua New Guinea (June 30, 2011) Adm. Patrick Walsh, commander of U.S. Pacific Fleet, center between flagpoles, accompanied by Papua New Guinea Defence (PNGDF)
- Tuarama; Port Moresby, Papua New Guinea, National Capital District

Information
- Established: 1951

Taurama Barrack Camp, the Land Forces Division is a primary unit based in Port Moresby, the capital of Papua New Guinea. They are light infantry.

== History ==
The First Light Infantry Battalion is based in Port Moresby. It was raised by the Australian Army at the Taurama Military Base in 1951. Originally the cadet school, the PNG Defence Academy, the 1st Battalion is the senior unit of the Royal Pacific Island Regiment. It consists of four rifle companies, reconnaissance, signals, motor, artillery, regimental first aid and band sections, and an administrative company with medical, transport and general engineering. first Royal Pacific Island Regiment is responsible for securing the land border with Indonesia in western Province.

== See also ==
- PNGDF

== Gallery ==
Papua New Guinea Defence Force During Tamiok Strike 2026

SATMO Concludes Comprehensive Medical and Tactical Training with Papua New Guinea Defence Force

Papua New Guinea Defense Force completes Gender Focal Point training with U S DoD support
