= Konedobu =

- Location within Papua New Guinea
- Coordinates: 9°28′11″S 147°9′35″E
- Country: Papua New Guinea
- Province: NCD
- City: Port Moresby
- Time zone: UTC+10 (AEST)
- Postcode: 125

Konedobu is a suburb of Port Moresby, the capital of Papua New Guinea. It is located in the valley in between Touaguba Hill and Burns Peak.

The suburb is the location of numerous Government departments, including the headquarters of the Royal Papua New Guinea Constabulary. It also contains residential areas and The Hubert Murray Sports Stadium. The Aviat club and Royal Papua Yacht Club are located in Konedobu. The suburb is often referred to as 'Kone'. Prominent thoroughfares in Konedobu include Lawes Road and the Poreporena Freeway.

The Papua New Guinea Post-Courier has its head office in Konedobu.

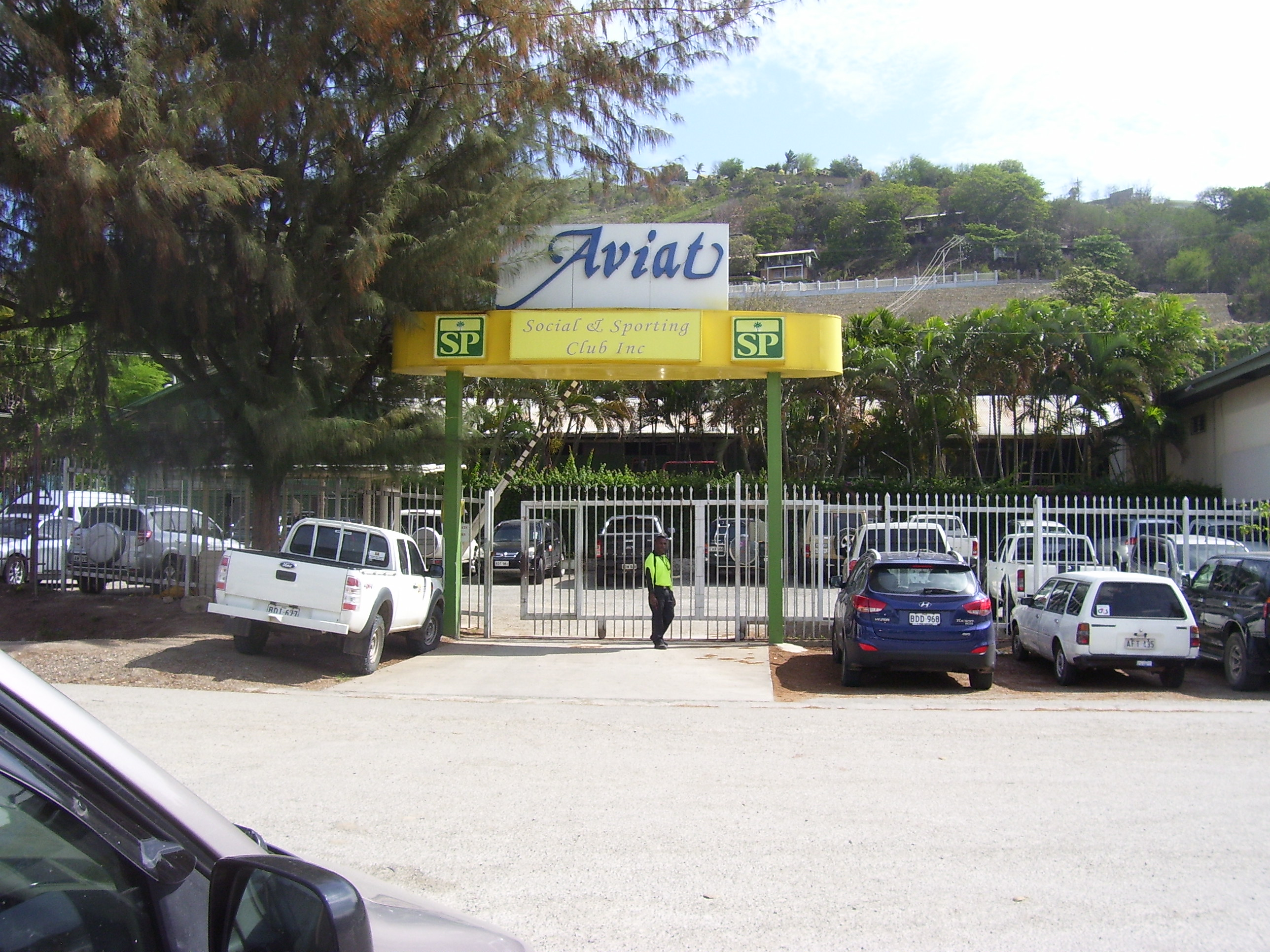
Aviat Club from parking lot

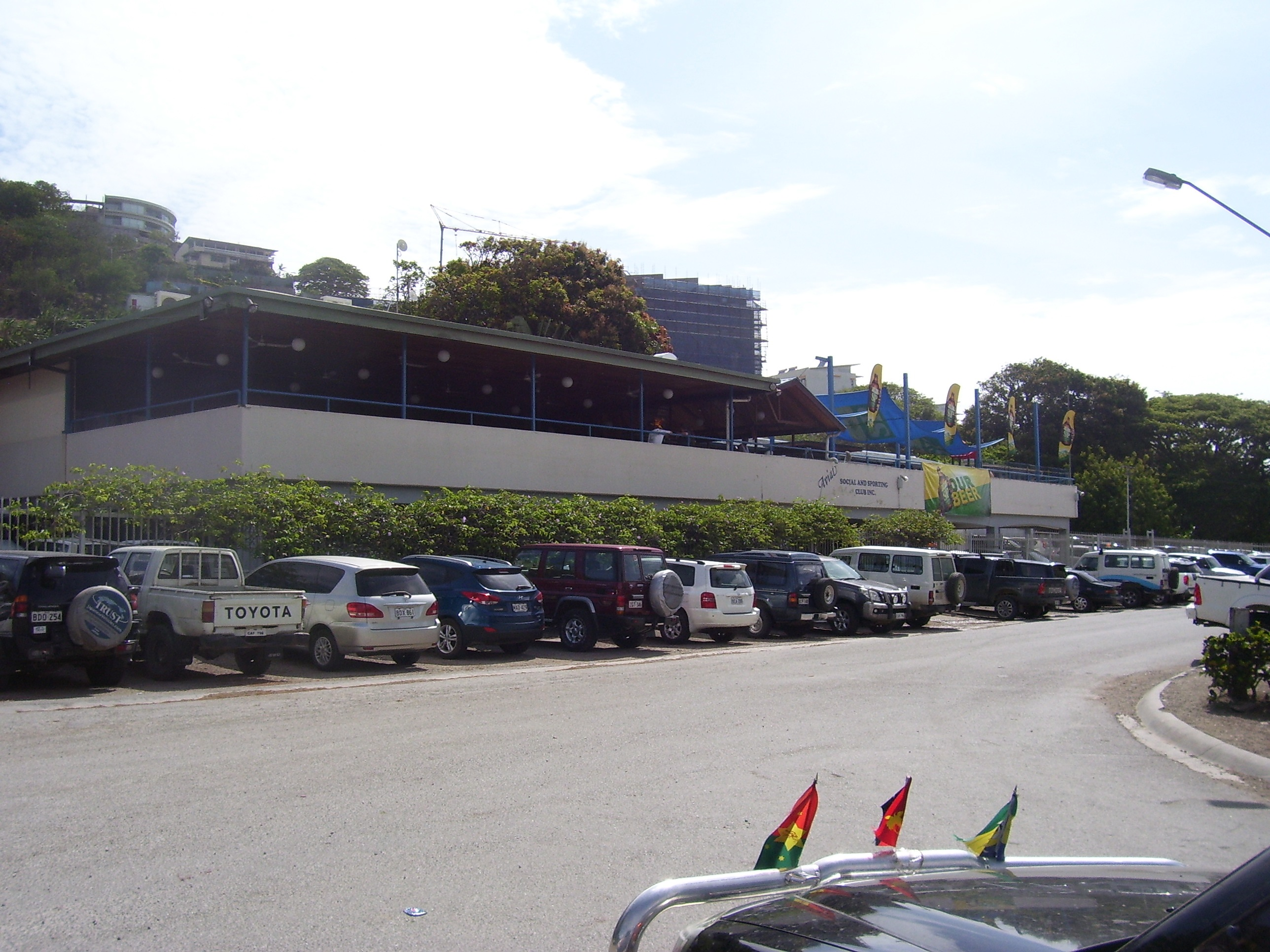
Aviat Club in Konedobu
