= Ensisi Valley =

- Location within Papua New Guinea
- Coordinates: 9°25′14″S 147°10′09″E
- Country: Papua New Guinea
- Province: NCD
- City: Port Moresby
- Time zone: UTC+10 (AEST)

Ensisi Valley is a suburb and housing area in the North-West of Port Moresby, the capital city of Papua New Guinea.
