= Moitaka =

- Location within Papua New Guinea
- Coordinates: 9°25′25″S 147°12′15″E
- Country: Papua New Guinea
- Province: NCD
- City: Port Moresby
- Time zone: UTC+10 (AEST)

Moitaka is a suburb of Port Moresby, the capital city of Papua New Guinea. It contains the Moitaka Wildlife Sanctuary.
