= Gordon North, Papua New Guinea =

Place in Port Moresby

Gordon North
- Location within Papua New Guinea
- Coordinates: 9°26′12″S 147°12′4″E
- Country: Papua New Guinea
- Province: NCD
- City: Port Moresby
- Time zone: UTC+10 (AEST)

Gordon North is a suburb of Port Moresby, the capital city of Papua New Guinea. It is a residential suburb adjacent to the Australian High Commission.
