= Tokarara =

- Location within Papua New Guinea
- Coordinates: 9°25′50″S 147°9′57″E
- Country: Papua New Guinea
- Province: NCD
- City: Port Moresby
- Time zone: UTC+10 (AEST)

Tokarara is residential suburb located on the North West of Port Moresby, the capital city of Papua New Guinea.
