= Ela Beach =

Beach in Port Moresby, Papua New Guinea

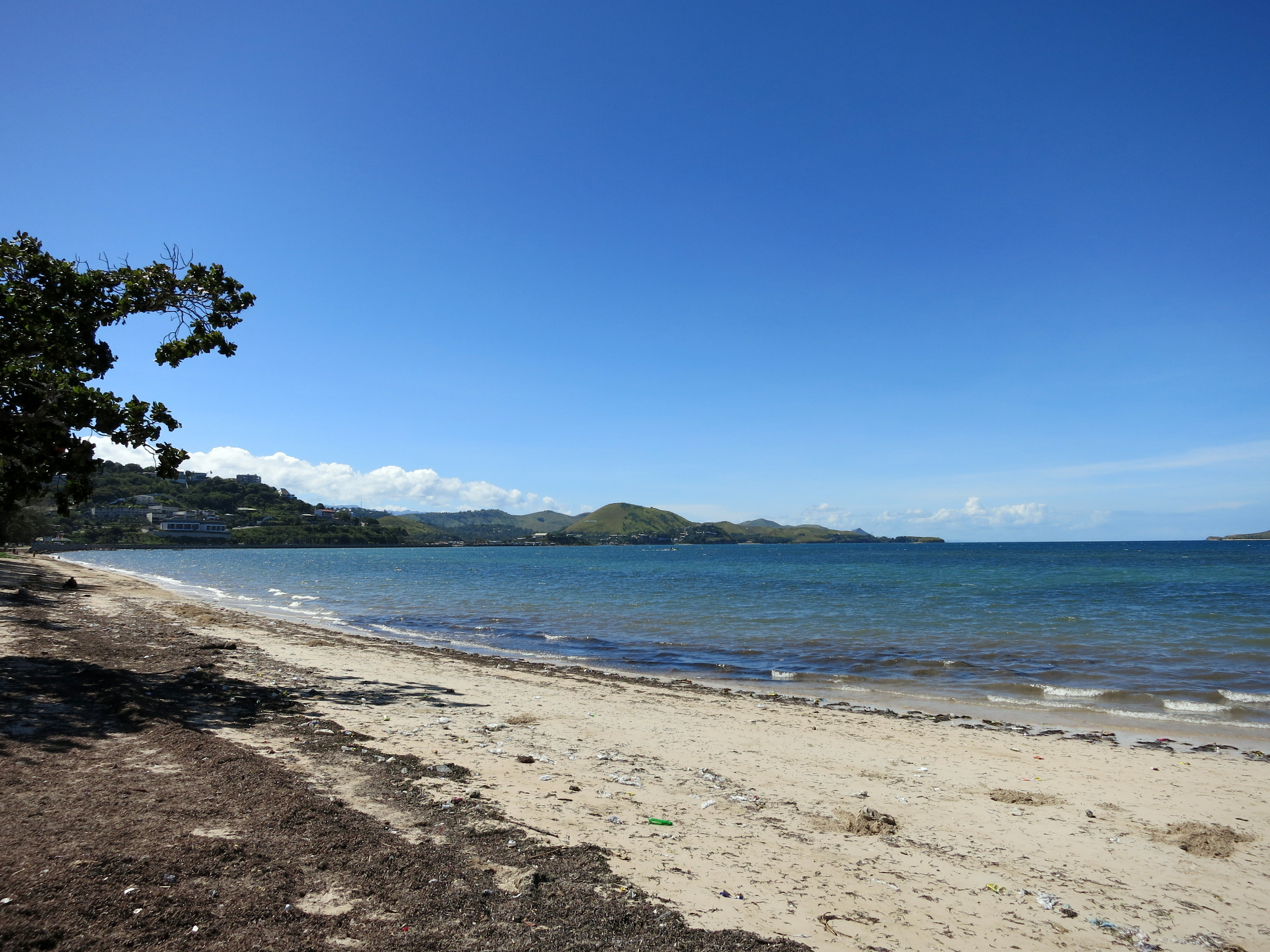
Ela Beach

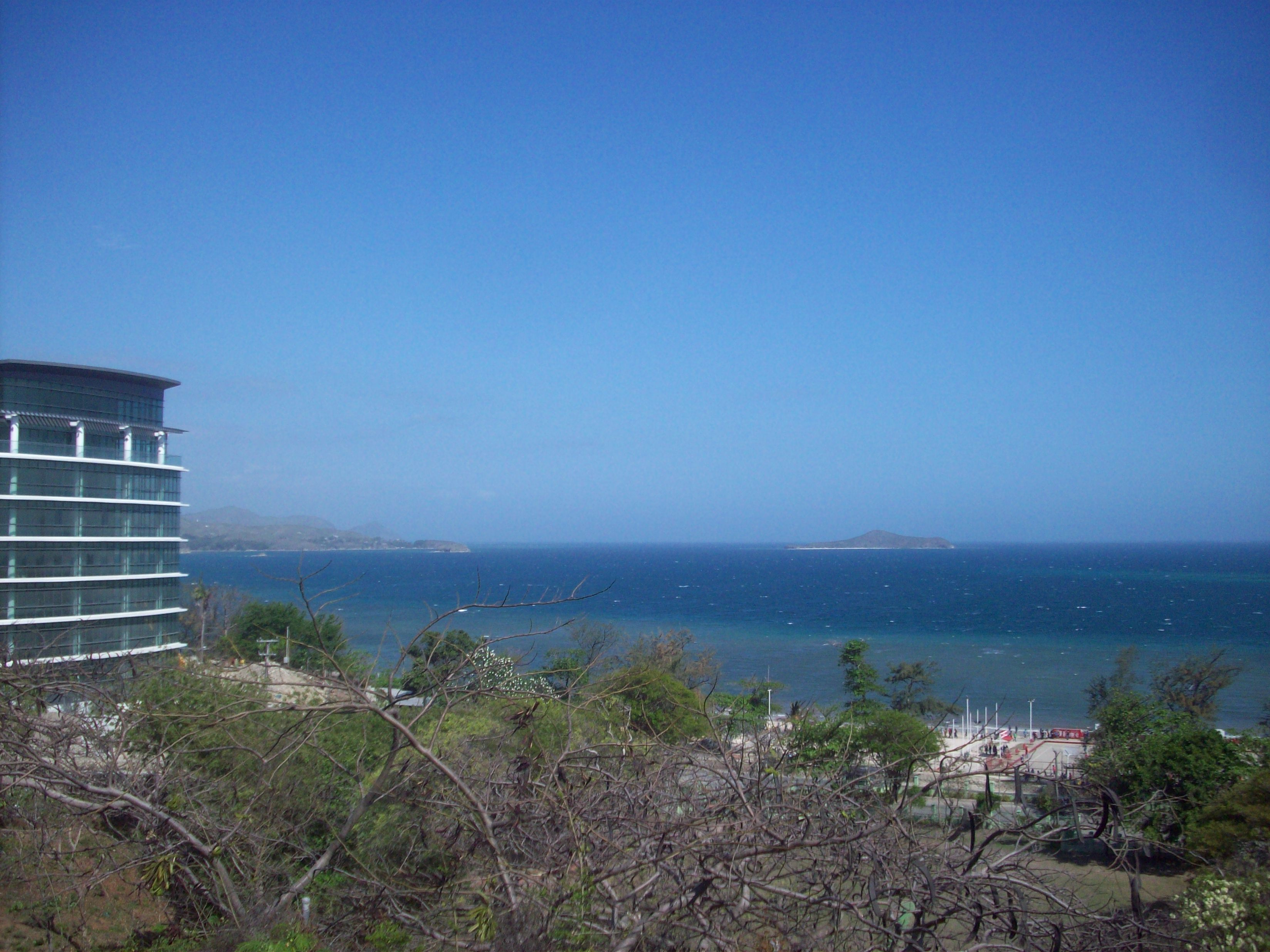
Sea and islands from a hill above Ela Beach

Ela Beach, formerly known as Era Kone, meaning 'Turtle Beach' in the Motuan dialect of the Papuan region of Papua New Guinea, is Port Moresby's primary public beach.

With white sand stretching approximately 1 km long.

Located along the Ela Beach front are various recreational facilities such as basketball courts, beach volleyball courts, a boardwalk, a three-star hotel, two kiosks and an amphitheater.

Ela Beach is also the host venue for the annual Hiri-Moale Festival.

== History ==
Local Motu-Koita people held an annual Hiri Moale Cultural Festival to celebrate the ancient Hiri trade voyages that used to be launched from Era Kone.

A native hospital close to Ela Beach was closed in 1957 or 1958.
