= Morata, Papua New Guinea =

Morata
- Location within Papua New Guinea
- Coordinates: 9°24′33″S 147°11′15″E
- Country: Papua New Guinea
- Province: NCD
- City: Port Moresby
- Time zone: UTC+10 (AEST)

Morata is a suburb of Port Moresby, the capital city of Papua New Guinea.
