= Saraga =

- Location within Papua New Guinea
- Coordinates: 9°27′13″S 147°12′33″E
- Country: Papua New Guinea
- Province: NCD
- City: Port Moresby
- Time zone: UTC+10 (AEST)

Saraga is a suburb of Port Moresby, the capital city of Papua New Guinea.
