= Boroko =

Suburb of Port Moresby, Papua New Guinea

- Location within Papua New Guinea
- Coordinates: 9°28′10″S 147°11′59″E
- Country: Papua New Guinea
- Province: NCD
- City: Port Moresby
- Time zone: UTC+10 (AEST)
- Postcode: 111

Boroko is a suburb of Port Moresby, the capital city of Papua New Guinea. It includes a residential area and a sports and recreation precinct and was once a significant commercial center, but the business area is now in decline.

== History ==
The town of Port Moresby was mainly confined to the peninsula near the port facilities in the early decades of the 20th century. An influx of Australian and American military personnel during World War II increased the rate of expansion inland, including the upgrade of the airstrip at Seven Mile (now Jacksons Airport), and the use of Murray Barracks at Four Mile, next to Boroko. Increased development continued after the war in the Boroko area.

== Facilities ==
The Shopping Centre hosts Port Moresby's main handicrafts market in the center of the old square at Boroko Market. However, many companies which once operated grocery supermarkets, furniture stores, restaurants and other social centers have moved away from Boroko in recent years, and many buildings in the old commercial center are now empty and abandoned. The Papua New Guinea Accident Investigation Commission retains its head office in the AIC Building in Boroko.

== Educational and religious facilities ==
Boroko has many long-established schools. Primary schools in Boroko include Boroko East International School, Bavaroko Primary School, and Coronation Primary School, whose name was given it when it was established in 1953, the year of the coronation of Queen Elizabeth II. The large Roman Catholic church. St Joseph's International Catholic College relocated to Boroko from Port Moresby in 1957, its land on Boroko Drive also containing a large parish church, a Baptist congregations church and the Anglican St. Martin's. Port Moresby International High School was established in 1960. More recently established high schools in Boroko include Port Moresby Grammar School, founded in 1998, and the Turkish-run PNG Paradise High School which was founded in 2007.The all-girls Caritas Technical Secondary School, located in East Boroko, is run by the catholic Caritas Sisters. The Don Bosco Technological Institute, located in East Boroko, is a Catholic tertiary educational administered by the Salesians.

== Clubs and sports ==
The sports and recreation precinct on Bisini Parade includes grounds for soccer, softball, netball, cricket, and rugby union and rugby league. The Lloyd Robson Oval is the National Stadium of Papua New Guinea with a capacity of 12,000 and is the home ground of the Papua New Guinea national rugby league team..

== Gallery ==
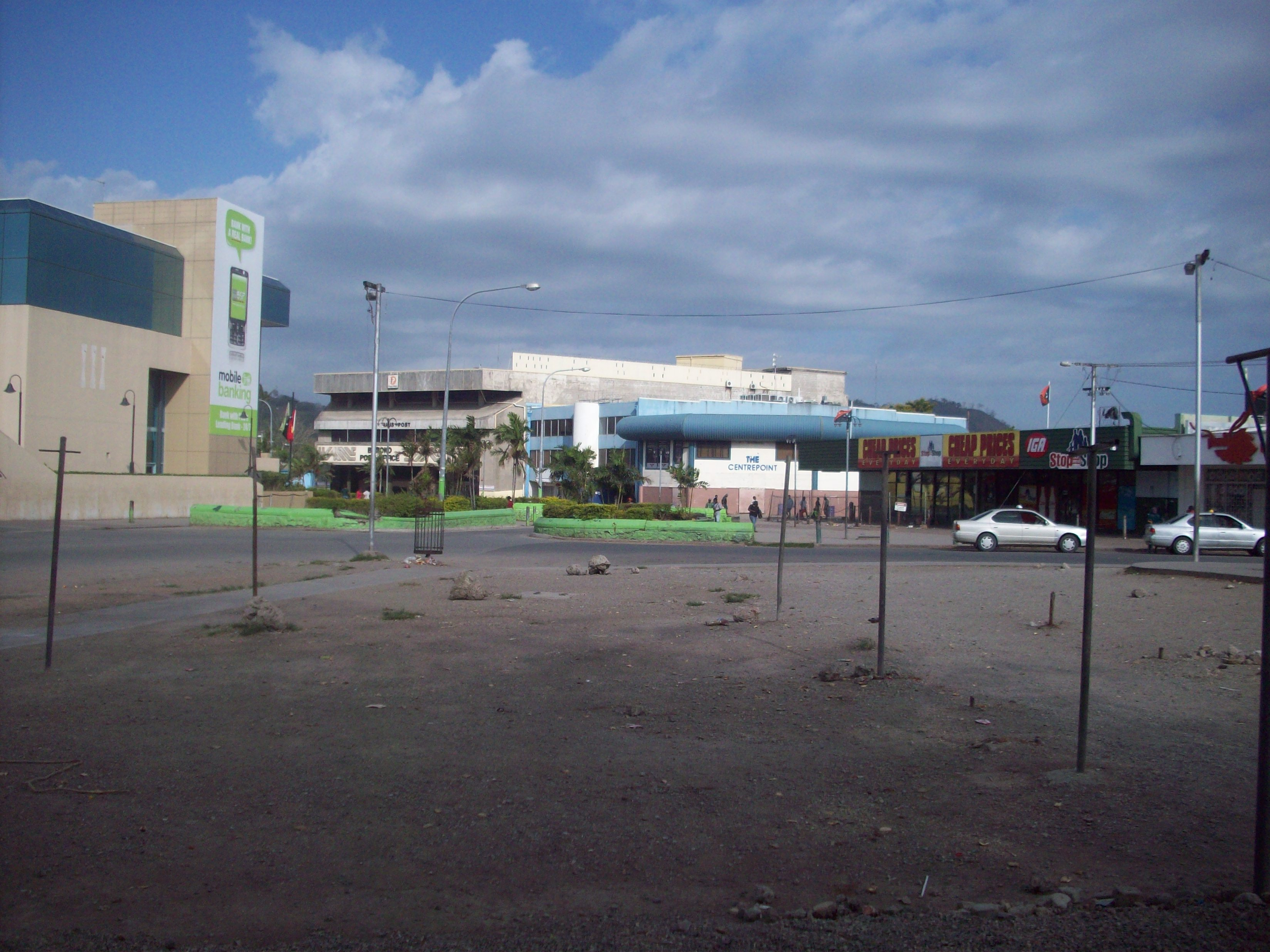
Boroko post office

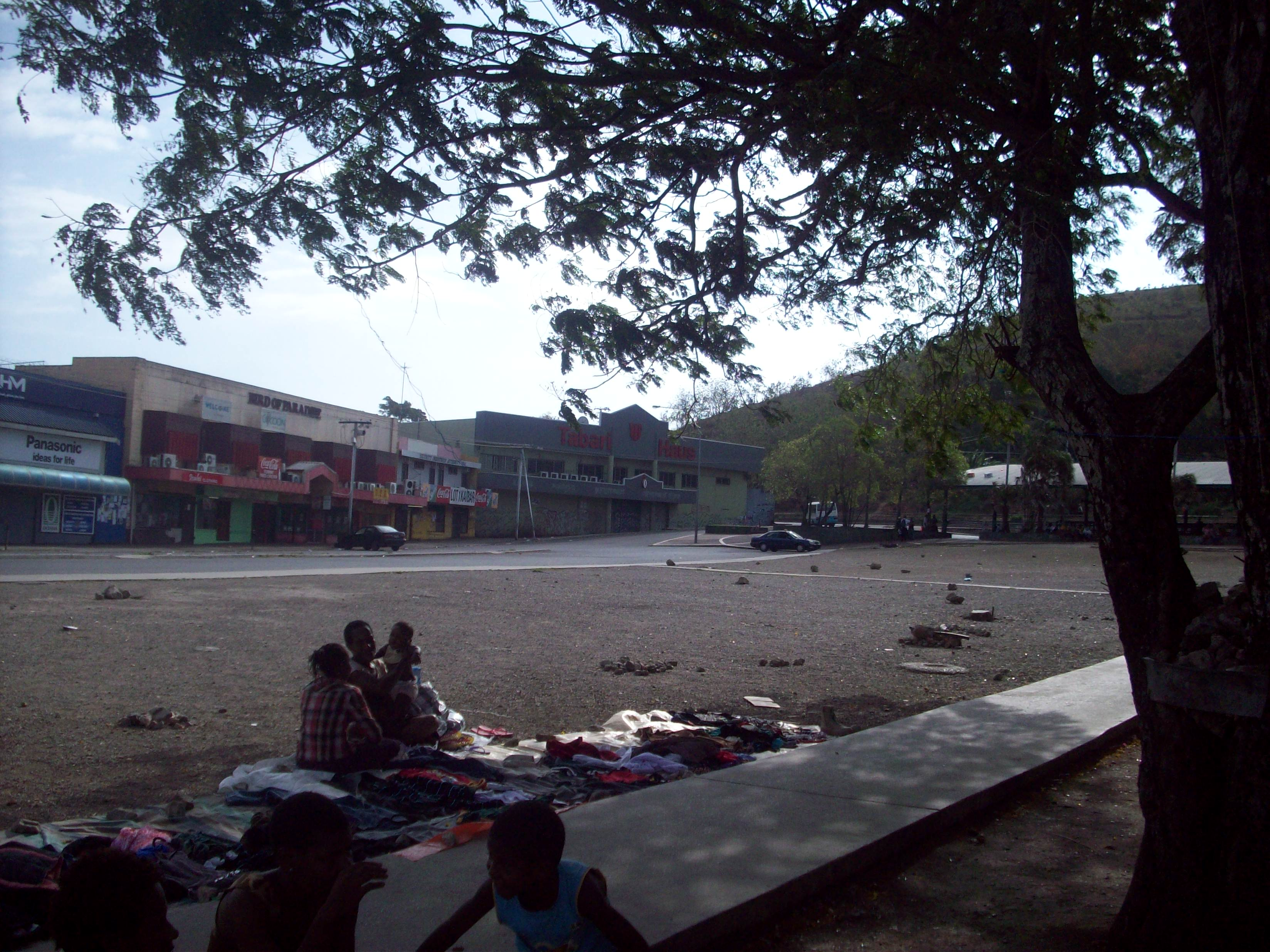
Streets and buildings in Boroko 2013

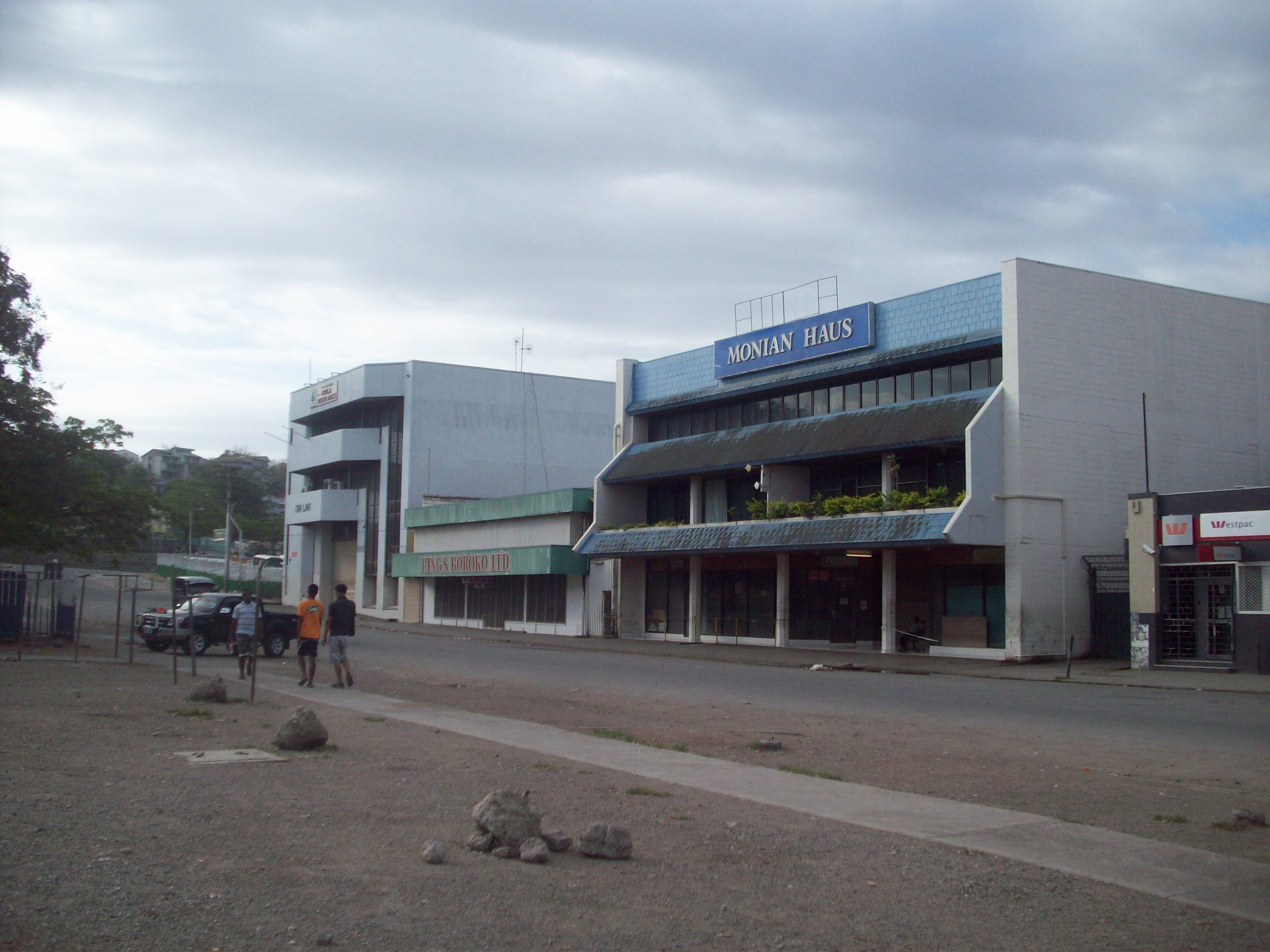
Empty Boroko store buildings

== See also ==
- Boroko Market
- Port Moresby
