= Noken =

Knotted or woven bag native to Indonesia

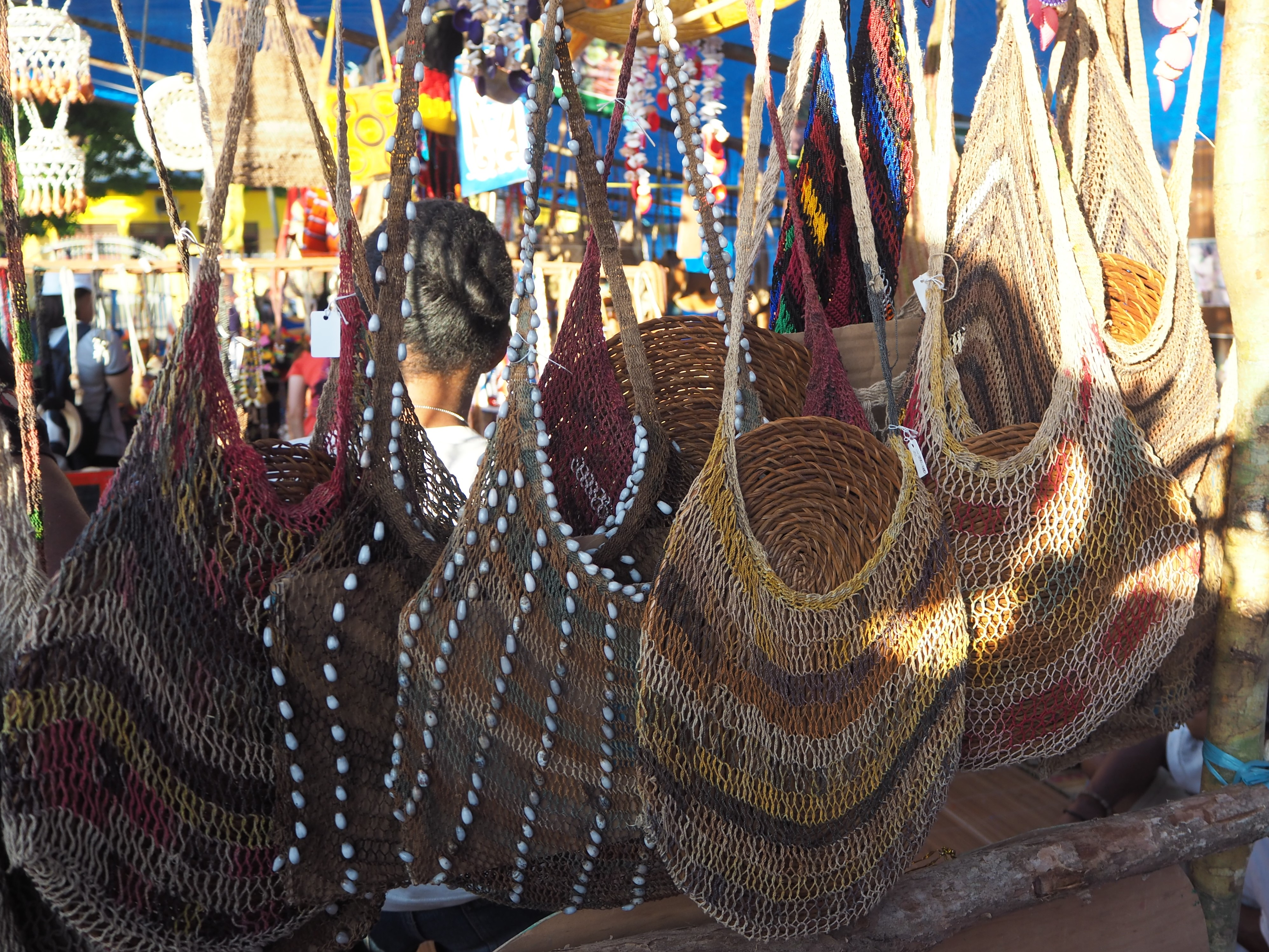
- Noken bags
- Type: Knotted or woven bag
- Place of origin: Western New Guinea, Indonesia

Noken multifunctional knotted or woven bag, handcraft of the people of Papua
- UNESCO Intangible Cultural Heritage
- Country: Indonesia
- Reference: 00619
- Region: Asia and the Pacific

Inscription history
- Inscription: 2012 (7th session)
- List: Need of Urgent Safeguarding

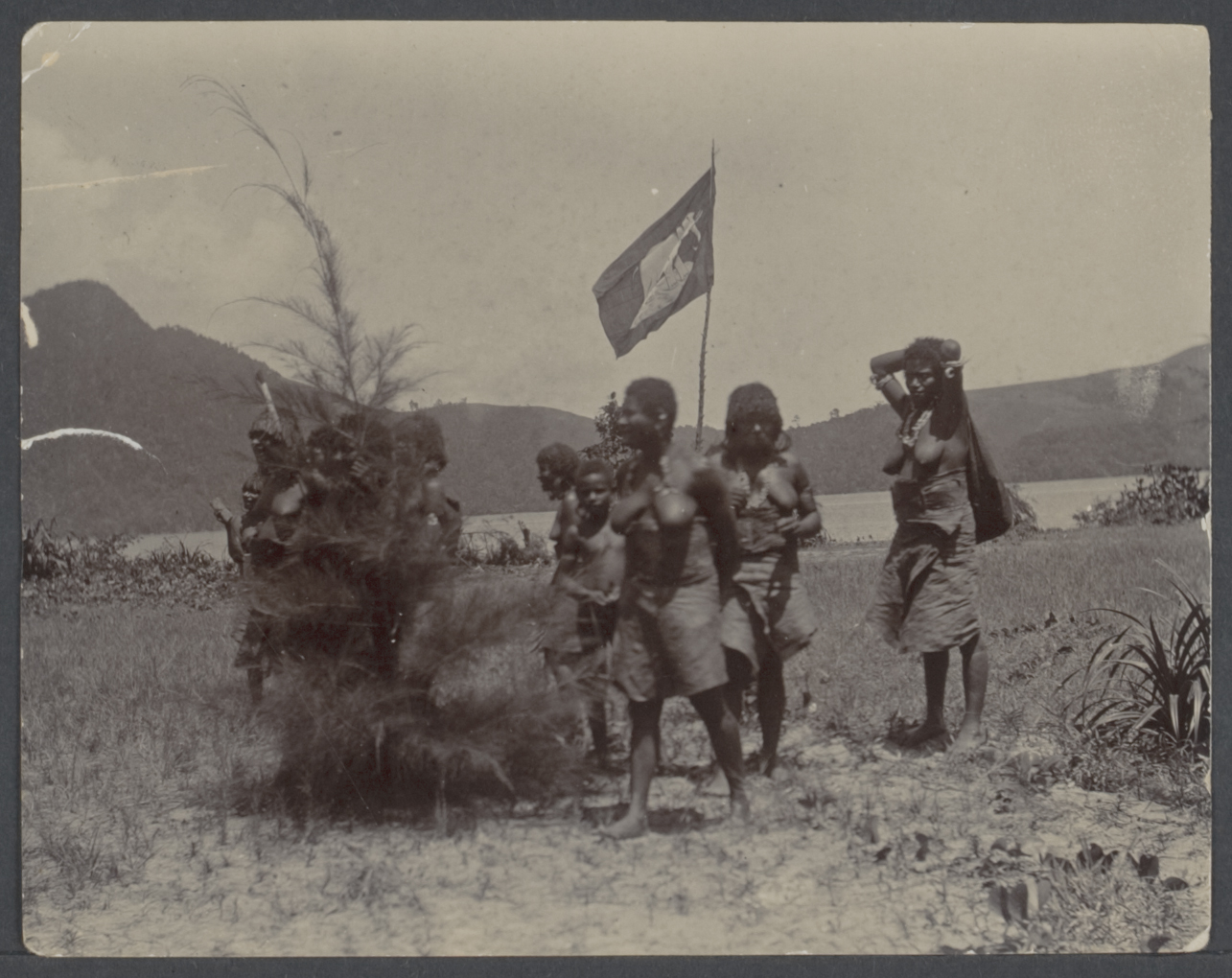
Papuan women and her nokens in Metu Debi island off Youtefa Bay, Jayapura, Indonesia, c. 1899

Noken (from Biak inoken) is a traditional Papuan multifunctional knotted or woven bag native to the Western New Guinea region, Indonesia. Its distinctive usage, which involves being hung from the head, is traditionally used to carry various goods, and also children.

== Cultural significance ==
In 2012, noken was listed in the UNESCO Intangible Cultural Heritage Lists as a cultural heritage of Indonesia. Women carrying noken are still a common sight in Wamena.

On December 4, 2020, Google celebrated noken with a Google Doodle.

== Usage in politics ==
Map of regencies which implement the noken system for elections according to General Elections Commission. Red: practiced the noken system for the 2019 elections. Pink: used to practice the noken system, but not for the 2019 elections

In several areas of Central Papua and Highland Papua, noken – instead of the usual ballot box – is preferred as a way to place ballots, where it is recognized as a ballot tool and system where a big man (primarily chieftains) casts votes for the tribe or noken gantung, where the tribe members and the chief collectively decide to vote unanimously in the regional leadership elections. Opponents to the system have, in the Constitutional Court of Indonesia, challenged the use of noken as fraught with potential for abuse. The court defended the limited use of noken for avoiding inter-tribal warfare, but ruled that regencies that have used a one man, one vote system cannot return to noken system.

For the 2024 election, twelve regencies in Central and Highland Papua used the noken system to some extent, and seven of the twelve regencies used the noken system in all polling stations.

== Gallery ==
Selling and Making Noken

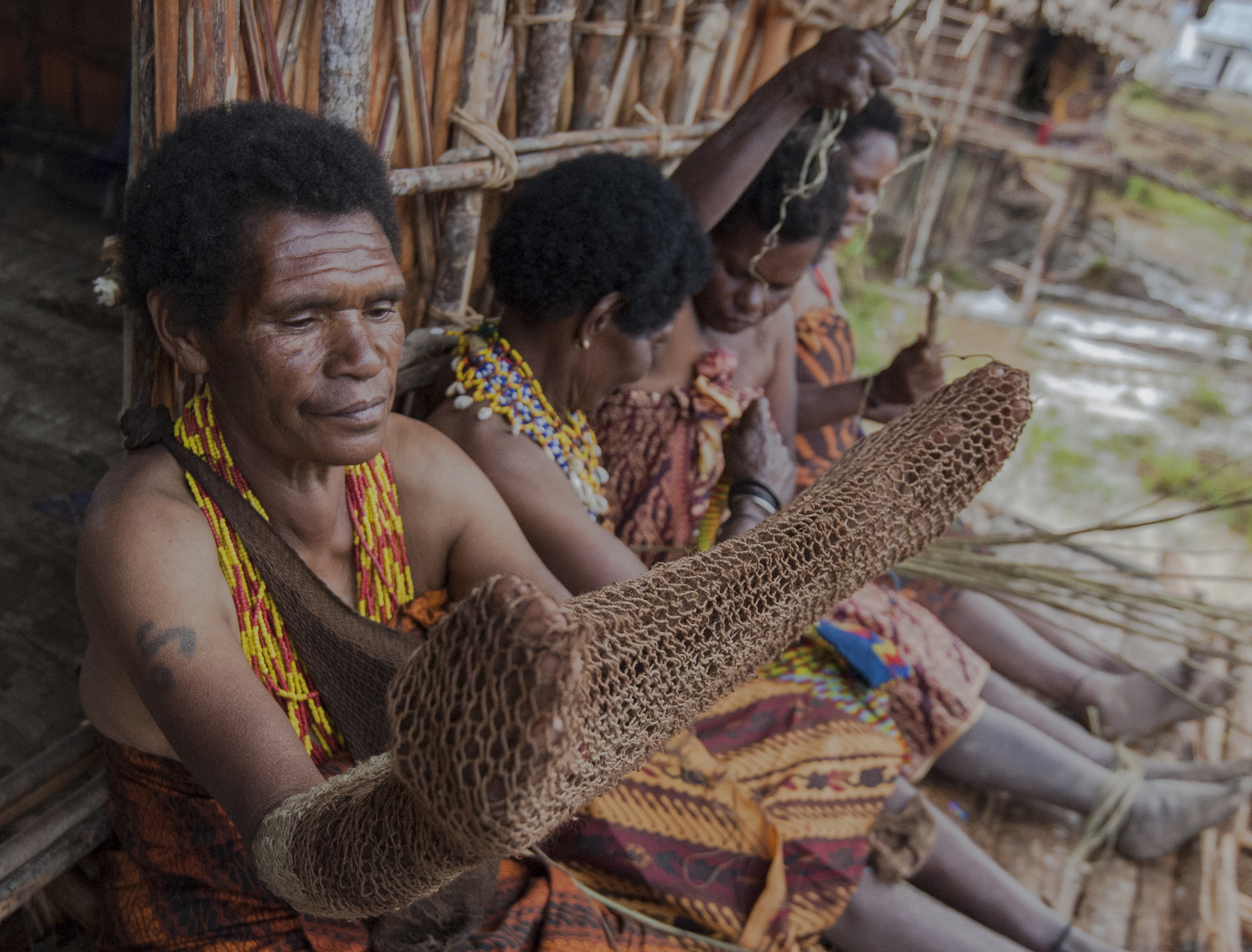

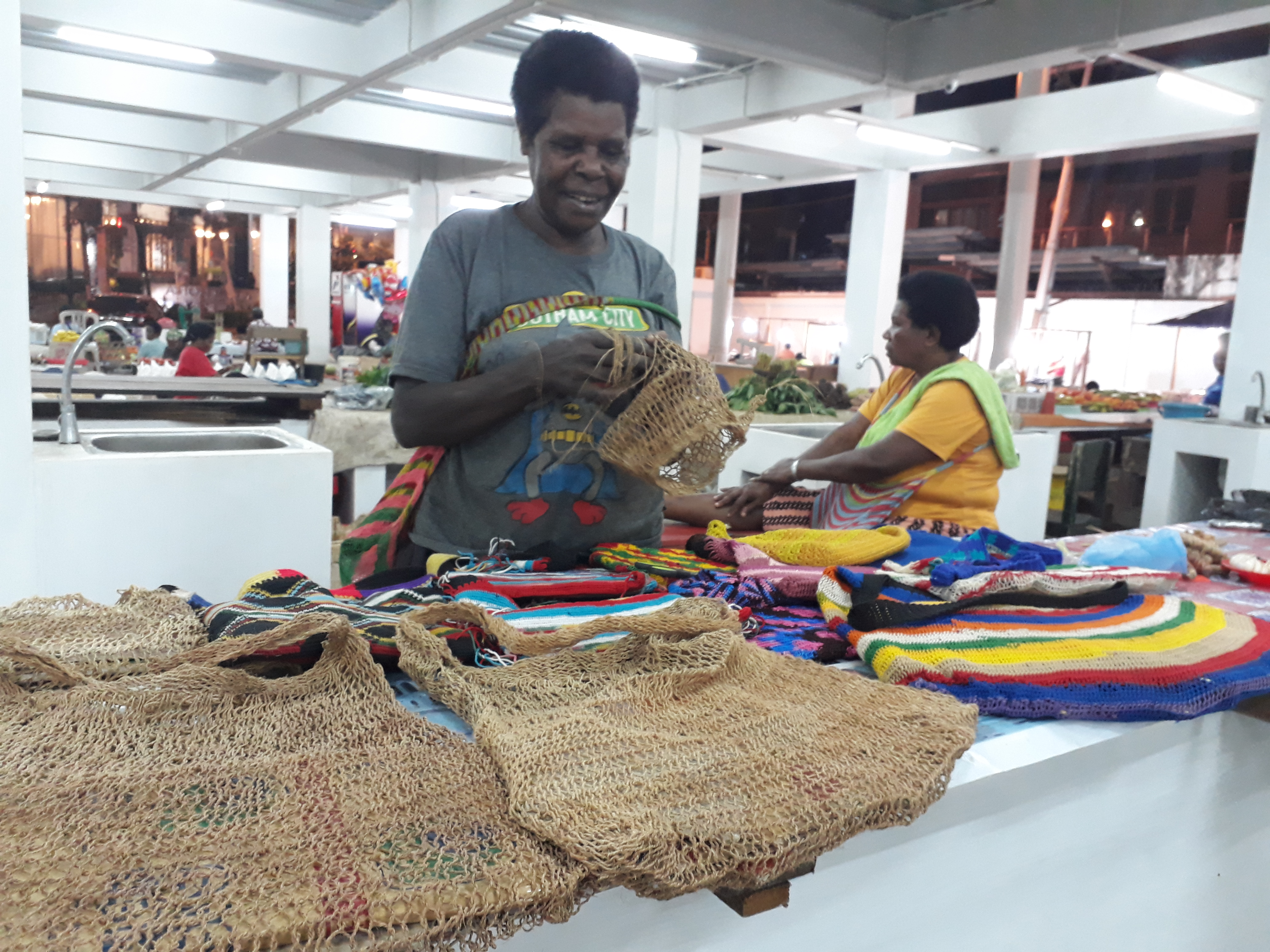

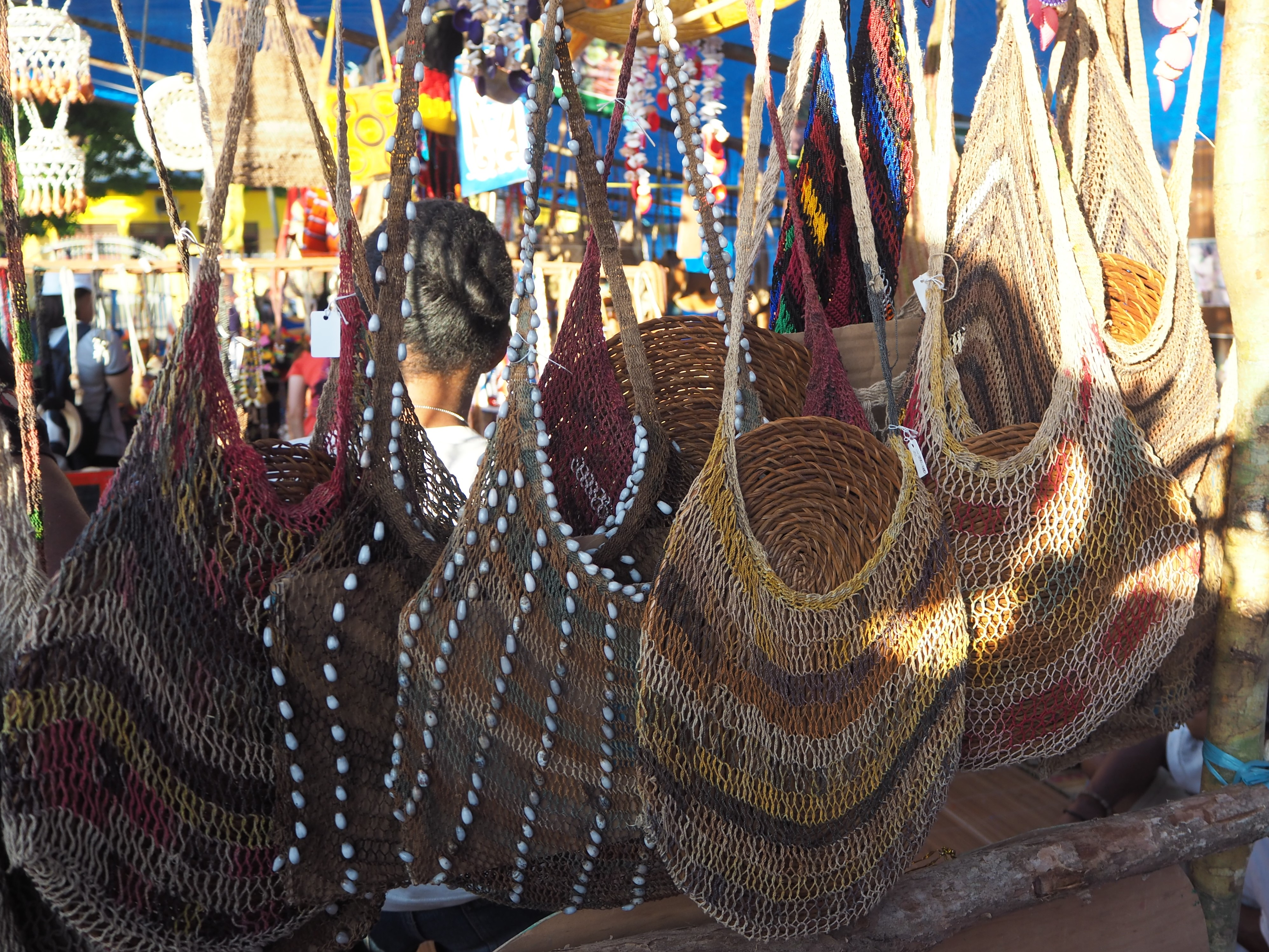

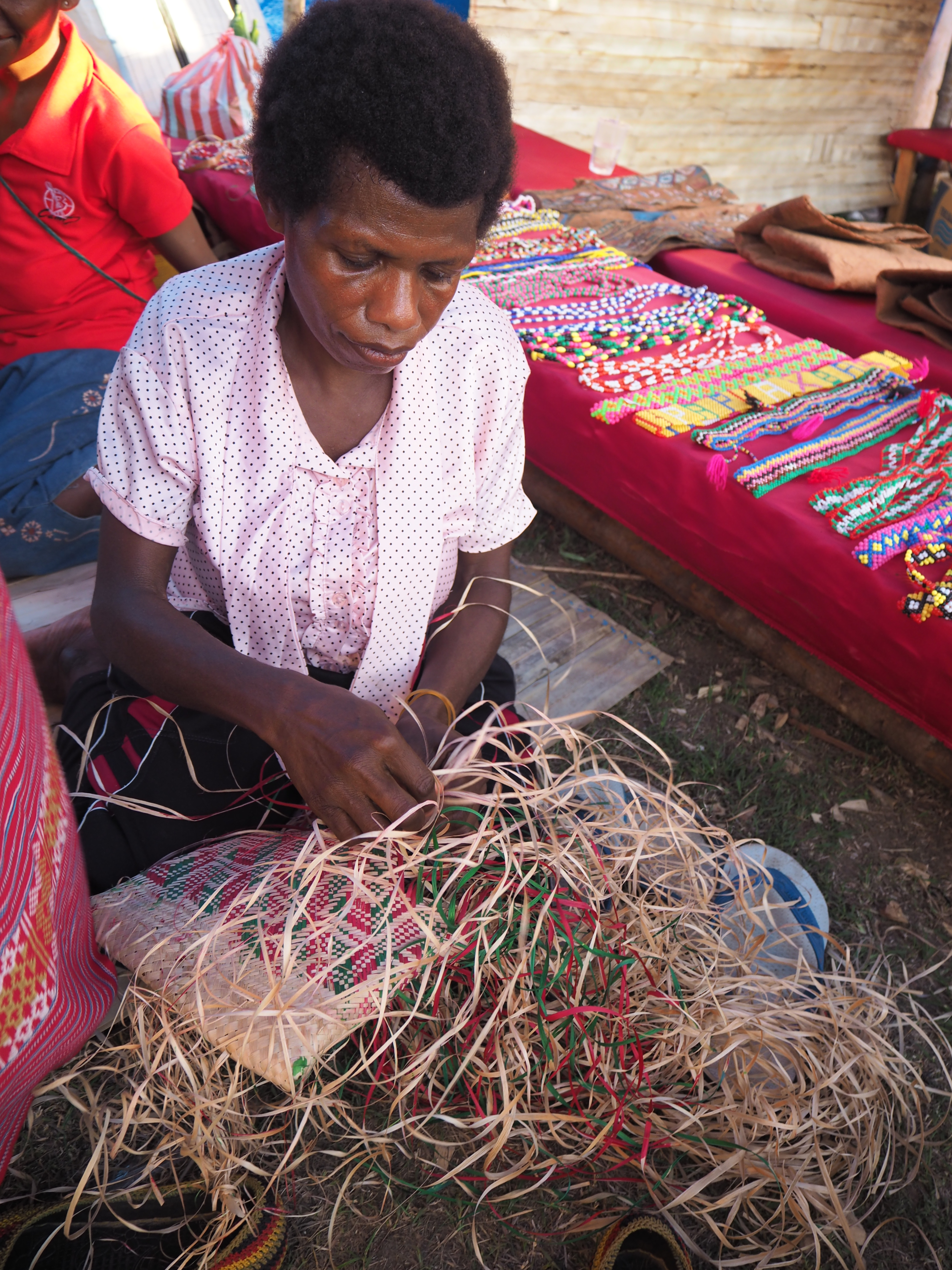

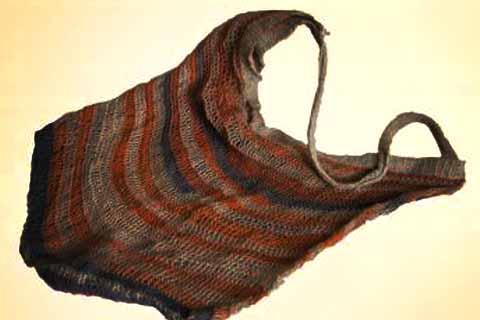

== See also ==
- Indonesian art
- Culture of Indonesia
