= Port Moresby International School =

Location
- Port Moresby; Papua New Guinea; 9°28′6″S 147°12′28″E

Information
- School type: Private
- Motto: Excellence – Commitment – Diversity – Integrity
- Established: 1960
- Principal: Steven Rowley
- Grades: 7-12
- Enrolment: 950
- Website: www.pmis.iea.ac.pg

Port Moresby International School (PMIS) is a private international school in Port Moresby, Papua New Guinea providing education from year 7 through 12 to both the Papua New Guinean and expatriate community. The school is one of the 20 establishments managed by the International Education Agency of Papua New Guinea.

The school holds an annual "UN Concert", a fête for international culture where students wear costumes and perform cultural works.

== Curriculum ==
PMIS's curriculum is based on the following courses:

- Papua New Guinea School & Higher School Certificates: External examinations are conducted in Grades 8, 10 & 12 for certification.
- Australian Capital Territory Senior Secondary Certificate: Externally moderated courses at Grades 11–12. The ACT Senior Secondary Certificate is issued in year 12 and students have the opportunity to gain an Australian Tertiary Admission Rank (ATAR) which enables entrance into Australian universities.
- International General Certificate of Secondary Education: The IGCSE has external examinations that are internationally accredited and externally moderated by University of Cambridge International Examinations. Examinations occur in Grades 8 & 10.
- International Baccalaureate: The IB Diploma Programme is a two-year programme offered at the Grade 11 and 12 level. It has external examinations and gives students the opportunity to gain university entrance around the world.

== History ==
The school began in 1959 when some older children met informally at Ela Beach Primary School to take Australian correspondence courses. In 1960, the school moved to Boroko and consisted of 190 students. Prior to independence, schools were classified as either Australian or Territory schools. As Port Moresby served mostly expatriates, it was designated as an Australian school.
