= Erima =

- Location within Papua New Guinea
- Coordinates: 9°26′17″S 147°11′57″E
- Country: Papua New Guinea
- Province: NCD
- City: Port Moresby
- Time zone: UTC+10 (AEST)
- Postcode: 131

Erima is a suburb of Port Moresby, the capital city of Papua New Guinea.
