= Gerehu =

- Location within Papua New Guinea
- Coordinates: 9°23′17″S 147°8′38″E
- Country: Papua New Guinea
- Province: NCD
- City: Port Moresby
- Time zone: UTC+10 (AEST)
- Postcode: 136

Gerehu is a large residential suburb to the north of Port Moresby, the capital city of Papua New Guinea.

The suburb is divided into stages from 1 to 7 and is home to approximately 50,000 of Port Moresby's residents.

It is in the city's North West electorate and is like a small township of its own with basic amenities such as schools, markets, a police station, churches, a hospital and recreational parks.
