= Hohola =

- Location within Papua New Guinea
- Coordinates: 9°27′41″S 147°10′55″E
- Country: Papua New Guinea
- Province: NCD
- City: Port Moresby
- Time zone: UTC+10 (AEST)

Hohola is a suburb of Port Moresby, the capital city of Papua New Guinea. It includes Murray Barracks, the Headquarter Battalion of Papua New Guinea Defense Force and also Headquarters PNG Pawa, the only Electricity provider in the country.
