= Hanuabada =

Coastal village in Papua New Guinea

Coordinates: 9°27′S 147°08′E

- Village
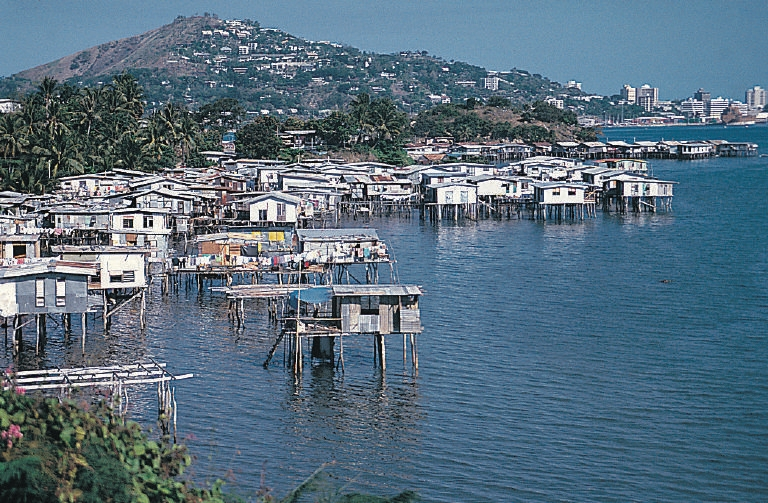
- Interactive map of Hanuabada
- Country: Papua New Guinea
- Province: NCD
- City: Port Moresby
- Time zone: UTC+10 (AEST)

Hanuabada is a coastal village in Papua New Guinea in the outskirts of the nation's capital, Port Moresby. It is the biggest village in the Motuan tribe and is often known by its locals as "HB".

Hanuabada means "big village" (hanua "village" + bada "big", the former from Proto-Oceanic (*panua) in Motu. It is northwest of Downtown Port Moresby. It has a population of over 15,000. It is a Motuan village and is part of Poreporena, which includes both Hanuabada and Elevala.

The village was the site of the declaration of the New Guinea Protectorate by the British in 1884.

Hanuabada is known for producing a large proportion of the players on the Papua New Guinea national cricket team. This was also the birthplace of the village Liklik Kricket Competition. The village is also the home of Commonwealth Champions Geua Vada Steven Kari and Dika Toua. Of Papua New Guinea's nine Commonwealth Games medals, eight have come from Hanuabada.

In May 2015, there was a police raid in Hanuabada in which the police of Port Moresby confiscated more than 1,000 bags of betel nuts. The total value of these nut sacks was estimated to be over US$180,000.

Hanuabada is also known for its LGBT community, with many fleeing to the city to escape discrimination and violence.

Anne, Princess Royal visited Hanuabada and the site of the 1884 flag-raising as part of her Royal Tour to commemorate the Platinum Jubilee of Queen Elizabeth II.
