= Six Mile, Papua New Guinea =

Six Mile Sikismail
- Location within Papua New Guinea
- Coordinates: 9°27′43″S 147°12′52″E
- Country: Papua New Guinea
- Province: NCD
- City: Port Moresby
- Time zone: UTC+10 (AEST)

Six Mile (Tok Pisin: Sikismail) is located in the Saraga suburb on the eastern edge of Port Moresby, the capital city of Papua New Guinea.

The Civil Aviation Safety Authority of Papua New Guinea has its headquarters in Six Mile.
