= Korobosea =

- Location within Papua New Guinea
- Coordinates: 9°28′36″S 147°11′32″E
- Country: Papua New Guinea
- Province: NCD
- City: Port Moresby
- Time zone: UTC+10 (AEST)

Korobosea is a suburb of Port Moresby, the capital city of Papua New Guinea. It contains the Port Moresby General Hospital and a residential area. Some of the houses in Korobosea date back to the colonial era.
