= Gordon, Papua New Guinea =

Place in Port Moresby

Gordon
- Location within Papua New Guinea
- Coordinates: 9°26′59″S 147°11′44″E
- Country: Papua New Guinea
- Province: NCD
- City: Port Moresby
- Time zone: UTC+10 (AEST)

Gordon, sometimes spelt Gordons, is a suburb of Port Moresby, the capital city of Papua New Guinea. This is the industrial area, and most business houses operate in this suburb. Also has residential area just at Gordon North.
