= Royal Pacific Islands Regiment =

Infantry regiment of the Papua New Guinea Defence Force

The Royal Pacific Islands Regiment
- Cap badge of the Pacific Islands Regiment
- Active: 1944–46; 1951–Present
- Country: Australia (1951–75); Papua New Guinea (1975–Present)
- Branch: Army
- Type: Infantry
- Role: Light infantry
- Size: Two battalions
- Part of: Papua New Guinea Defence Force
- Garrison/HQ: 1st Battalion – Port Moresby; 2nd Battalion – Wewak
- Motto(s): To Find a Path
- Engagements: World War II; Pacific War; Solomon Islands campaign; Bougainville campaign; New Britain campaign

Commanders
- Colonel-in-Chief: Charles III

The Royal Pacific Islands Regiment (RPIR) is an infantry regiment of the Papua New Guinea Defence Force (PNGDF). The regiment is descended from the Australian Army infantry battalions formed from native soldiers and Australian officers and non-commissioned officers in the territories of Papua and New Guinea during World War II to help fight against the Japanese. Disbanded after the war, the regiment was re-raised in 1951 as part of the Australian Army and continued to serve until Papua New Guinea gained its independence in 1975, when it became part of the PNGDF. Today, the RPIR consists of two battalions and has seen active service in Vanuatu, Bougainville and the Solomon Islands.

== History ==
=== World War II ===
The regiment is descended from the Australian Army infantry battalions formed in the territories of Papua and New Guinea during World War II to fight against the Japanese, following their invasion in 1942 and the subsequent New Guinea campaign. Its soldiers were primarily natives who fought under the command of Australian officers and non-commissioned officers (NCOs).

The Papuan Infantry Battalion (PIB) was raised in 1940, while the 1st and 2nd New Guinea Infantry Battalion both formed in 1944 and the 3rd New Guinea Infantry Battalion in 1945. The 4th New Guinea Infantry Battalion also began forming in 1945 but was soon disbanded, and the 5th New Guinea Infantry Battalion—although authorised—was never raised. The battalions each had an establishment of about 77 Europeans and 550 native soldiers. In November 1944 they were grouped together into a single Pacific Islands Regiment (PIR). A depot battalion was also established at Erap, near Nadzab in the Markham Valley, at this time.

Headquarters PIR was raised on 14 February 1945, occupying the old 1 NGIB camp site at Camp Diddy at Nadzab. They remained there until September, when they moved to Bumbu River, Lae. On 1 January 1946 they occupied the new headquarters site at Yunakanau, Rabaul. The Commanding Officers of Headquarters PIR during this period were as follows:

- Colonel W.M. Edwards (1944–45)
- Colonel H.T. Allan (1945–46)
- Colonel A.M. Macdonald (1946)

Units of the regiment fought in the campaigns in Papua, New Guinea, New Britain and Bougainville. Although often poorly equipped the native soldiers established a reputation for ferocity and tenacity in action. Indeed, PIR soldiers (both Europeans and natives) were awarded one Distinguished Service Order (DSO), six Military Crosses (MC), two George Medals (GM), three Distinguished Conduct Medals (DCM), 20 Military Medals (MM) and nine Mentions in Despatches (MID) and one US Legion of Merit. (Note: Figures for awards to PIR are difficult to accurately determine as most sources are incomplete, these figures are from Sinclair 1990, p. 298 and Byrnes 1989, pp. 228–246. However, neither Sinclair or Byrnes seem to include complete lists.)

Despite this reputation there were some incidents of indiscipline—particularly on New Britain during the raising of 2 NGIB—but these were usually related to pay and conditions or perhaps to perceived 'insensitivity' on the part of Australian officers. Regardless, in an expression of the colonial politics of the time some segments of the Australian New Guinea Administrative Unit (ANGAU), which had opposed the raising of native units in the first place, used these incidents to 'prove' that their formation had been a mistake all along.

During the course of the war more than 3,500 Papuans and New Guineans served in the ranks of the PIR, suffering casualties (both Europeans and natives) of 65 killed, 16 missing, 75 died of other causes, and 81 wounded. (Note: Casualties listed here are from Byrnes 1989, p. 269. Other sources commonly cite PIR casualties as 38 killed, 13 died of wounds, 10 missing believed killed, 62 killed in accidents/sickness, and 98 wounded, see Sinclair 1990, p. 306.) Losses inflicted on the Japanese included 2,201 killed, 110 probably killed, 118 wounded and 196 captured. The regiment was officially disbanded on 24 June 1946.

=== Post-World War II ===
Pacific Islands Regiment (as at 27 October 1945)
| Unit | Strength |
| HQ PIR | 67 |
| PIB | 574 |
| 1 NGIB | 538 |
| 2 NGIB | 500 |
| 3 NGIB | 481 |
| PIR Depot Bn | 144 |
| PIR Trg Coy | 34 |
Note: 392 recruits at Lae and Goroka.

In the years immediately following the war much consideration was given by the Australian Army to re-establishing a presence in Papua New Guinea; however, there was some opposition among white settlers to the raising of native units. As an interim measure, the re-establishment of the Papua New Guinea Volunteer Rifles (PNGVR) was approved in July 1949, re-forming as a 'whites-only' reserve unit of the Citizen Military Forces (CMF). In November 1950, after considerable debate, the raising of a locally recruited regular battalion was also authorised. Consequently, in March 1951 the Pacific Islands Regiment was reformed, with an initial strength of one battalion. The regiment remained a unit of the Australian Army until Papua New Guinea gained its independence.

It was envisioned that the PIR would have four roles in war-time: garrisoning Manus Island and other similar areas; patrolling the land border with Dutch New Guinea (later Indonesian West Irian); and acting as a delaying force if required; and providing detachments for Australian units deployed to PNG. One company was based at Port Moresby, while others were based at outstations at Vanimo (from October 1952), Los Negros (1954, but later abandoned for Cape Moem), and at Kokopo. The establishment of the regiment was initially limited to 600 men.

In December 1957 riots broke out in Port Moresby between soldiers and civilian, which had to be broken up by police. Ultimately 153 soldiers were fined and 15 discharged, while 117 civilians were also convicted. As a result of this incident the organisation of the PIR was reviewed and henceforth Australian officers would be required to serve between four and six years with the regiment, and a number would be returned as senior officers later in their careers, thereby avoiding the previous situation in which officers with little experience serving with PNG soldiers would be posted to the regiment.

In 1960 when the Pentropic division was introduced into the Australian Army, PIR remained the only infantry battalion organised on the old establishment. Meanwhile, a further outbreak of indiscipline occurred in January 1961, this time over discriminatory pay scales. Although the disaffected soldiers were largely removed, pay scales were increased, and efforts were made to break up the regional and tribal concentrations of soldiers within subunits. In 1961 the PIR was awarded the battle honours of the PIB and NGIBs. By 1962 the battalion numbered 75 Australians (officers and SNCOs) and 660 PNG soldiers.

During the Indonesia-Malaysia confrontation (1962–66) the regiment patrolled the Indonesia-Papua New Guinea border and although there was only one shooting incident between the PIR and Indonesian troops, a number of incursions took place and these patrols—which were often conducted in rugged terrain—placed considerable demands on Australia's already limited defence resources. Amid growing Australian concern about Indonesian intentions the PIR began training for guerilla operations, and in September 1963 a second battalion was authorised, subsequently being raised in 1965. A third battalion, although proposed on a number of occasions, was never formed. The strength of regiment rose to 185 Australians and 1,188 PNG soldiers. Papua New Guinea Command was subsequently formed in 1965, thereby ending the link with Headquarters Northern Command in Brisbane. Meanwhile, a proposal to send a rifle company to fight in Vietnam was resisted by the Australian Army.

In 1970, Prime Minister John Gorton sought to call out the PIR to keep the peace on the Gazelle Peninsula, where the separatist Mataungan Association was illegally occupying land. He believed that the local police would be unable to maintain control if the situation turned violent. Both the Defence Committee and Defence Minister Malcolm Fraser were opposed, and cabinet had not yet been consulted. After Fraser told him about the situation, Governor-General Paul Hasluck refused Gorton's request. He agreed to seek the approval of cabinet, which decided that the troops would only be called out if requested by the territorial administrator; this did not eventuate.

From 1963 NCO and junior officer ranks began to be filled with indigenous personnel, with junior officers being trained at the Officer Cadet School at Portsea in Victoria. By 1970 there were 30 PNG officers serving in the PIR. Regardless until independence in 1975 the regiment was controlled from Australia, with no local influence or command, a situation which occasionally caused ill feeling towards the PIR from PNG citizens who were increasingly moving into positions of authority in the lead-up to independence. In January 1973 military units in Papua New Guinea were re-designated the Papua New Guinea Defence Force, while formal defence powers were subsequently transferred in March 1975.

=== Post-independence ===
At the time of independence in 1975 the regiment became the main part of the new Papua New Guinea Defence Force. Since 1984, the Regiment's Colonel-in-Chief has been The King of Papua New Guinea. The regiment became a 'Royal' regiment in 1984, changing its name to become the Royal Pacific Islands Regiment. Currently, the regiment consists of two battalions:

- 1st Battalion, Royal Pacific Islands Regiment — Taurama Barracks, Port Moresby
- 2nd Battalion, Royal Pacific Islands Regiment — Moem Barracks, Wewak

Units of RPIR were deployed to Vanuatu in 1980 to put down a secessionist revolt there, and were again called out in aid of the civil power in Port Moresby in 1983. The regiment has also conducted operations against the OPM (Organisais Papua Merdeka or Free Papua Movement), based in Irian Barat, which were involved in fighting the Indonesian armed forces across the border. From 1989 to 1997 the PNGDF was involved in fighting the secessionist Bougainville Revolutionary Army (BRA) on Bougainville and Buka. More recently, following the passage of a constitutional amendment allowing the stationing of the PNGDF on foreign soil, 80 personnel joined the Australian-led Regional Assistance Mission to the Solomon Islands (RAMSI) in July 2003. PNGDF troops continued to serve in the Solomon Islands as part of the scaled down, rotational Pacific contingent until the military component of RAMSI was withdrawn in 2013.

The RPIR continues to train annually with the Australian Army, with activities such as Exercise Wantok Warrior allowing for sub-unit exchange between the Australians and the Papua New Guineans.

In 2019 the PNG Government adopted a plan to form a 3rd Battalion of the Royal Pacific Islands Regiment. It was decided in 2021 that the unit would be stationed in Hela Province. A forward operating base was to be established at Tari as the first element of this plan. As of 2025, no progress had been made in raising the battalion.

== Battle honours ==
- World War II: South West Pacific 1942–45, Kokoda Trail, Kokoda–Deniki, Nassau Bay, Tambu Bay, Finschhafen, Scarlet Beach, Liberation of Australian New Guinea, Sio–Sepik River, Kaboibus–Kiarivu and Bonis–Porton.

== Notes ==
Footnotes

Citations
