= Port Moresby =

Capital and largest city of Papua New Guinea

Port Moresby Pot Mosbi (Tok Pisin)
- Capital city
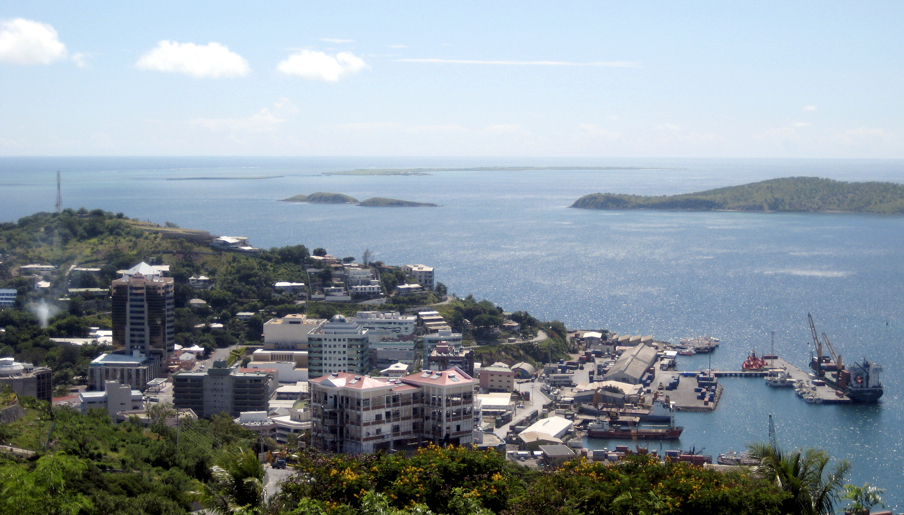
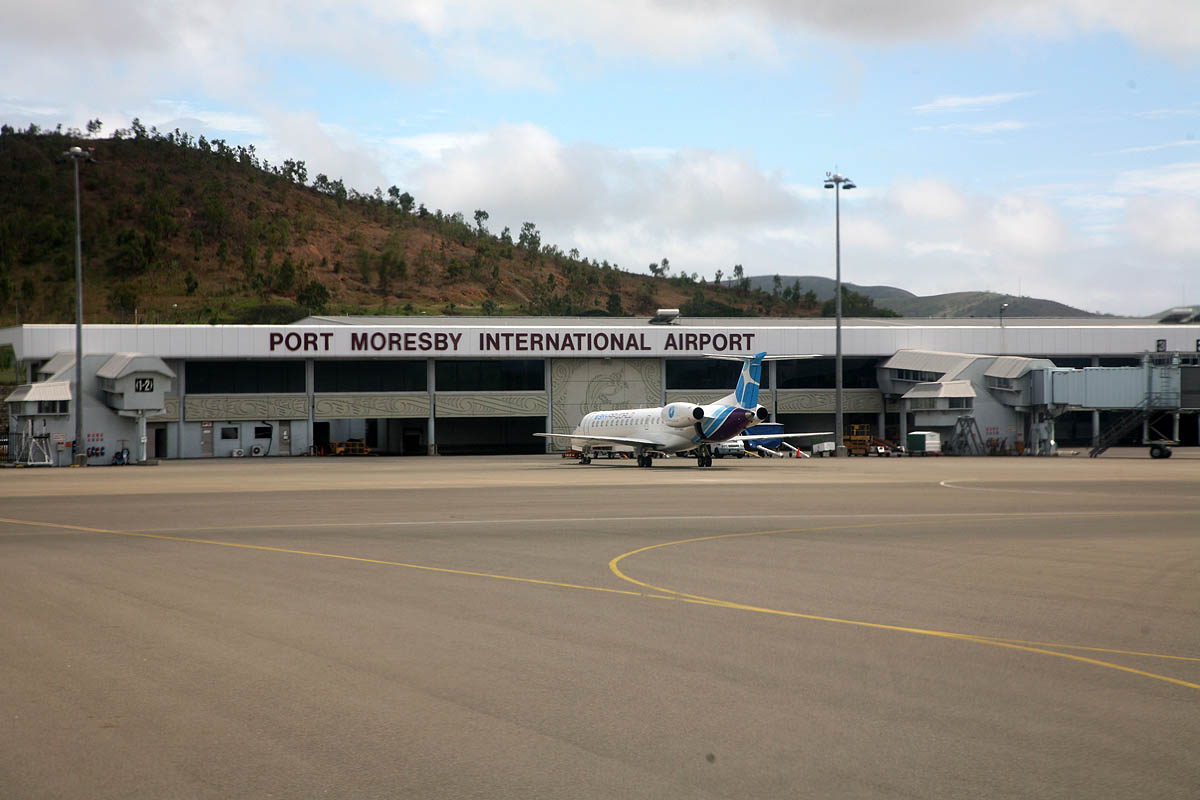
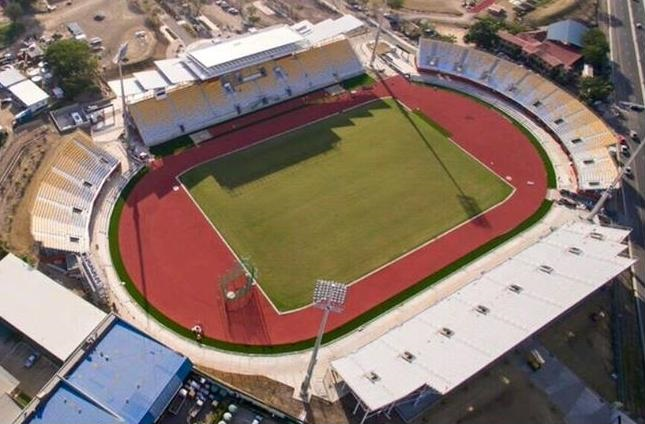
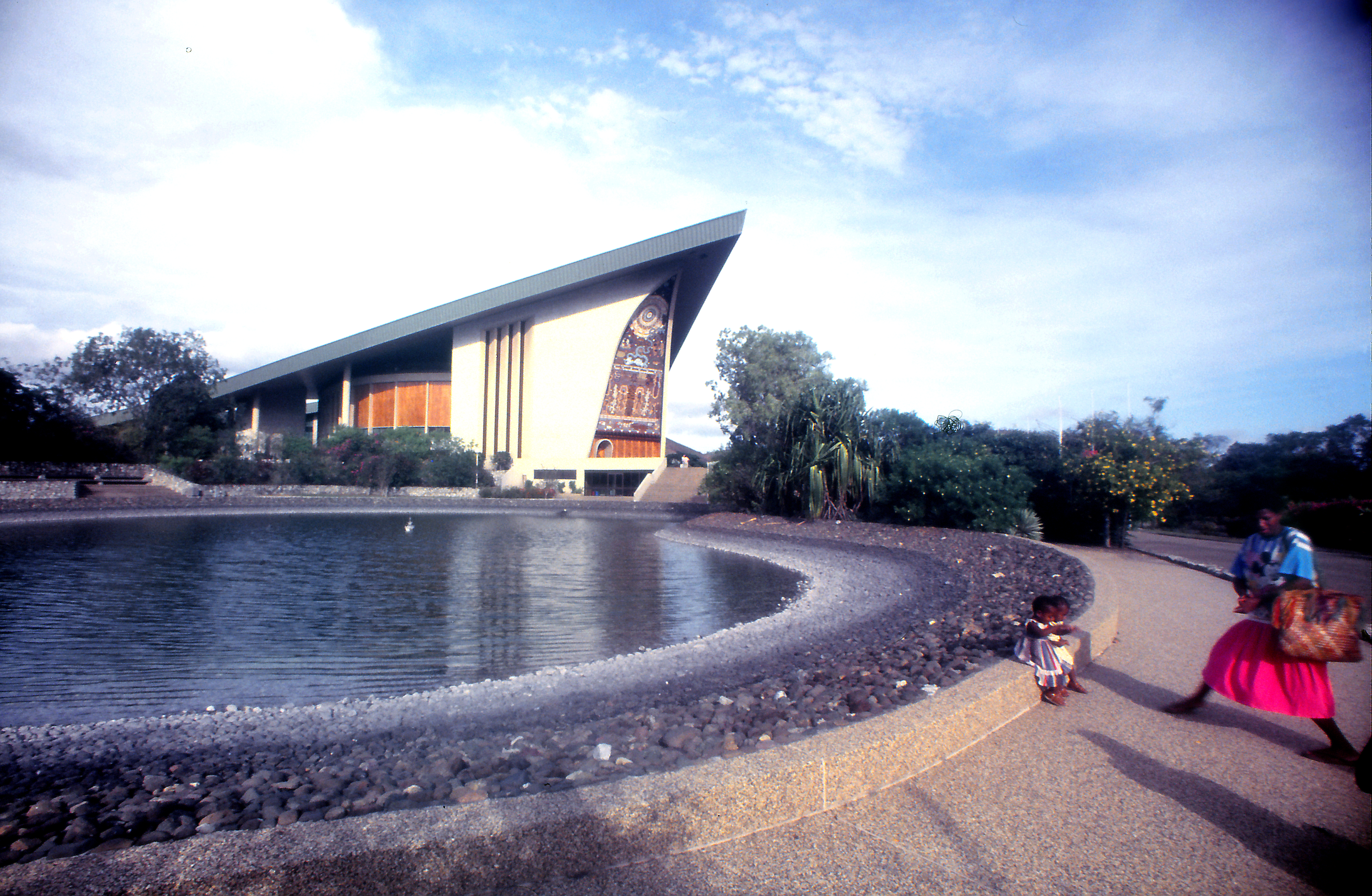
- Clockwise from top: Downtown of Port Moresby, Sir John Guise Stadium, National Parliament House, Port Moresby International Airport

- Flag
- Interactive map of Port Moresby
- Location within Papua New Guinea Location within Oceania Location within Earth
- Coordinates: 9°28′44″S 147°08′58″E
- Country: Papua New Guinea
- Division: National Capital District
- Established: 1885
- Named for: Admiral Fairfax Moresby

Government
  - Governor: Powes Parkop (2007–present)

Area
  - Total: 240 km^{2} (93 sq mi)
- Elevation: 35 m (115 ft)

Population (2024 census)
  - Total: 756,754
  - Rank: 1st
  - Density: 3,200/km^{2} (8,200/sq mi)

Languages
  - Main languages: Motu, Tok Pisin, English
- Time zone: UTC+10:00 (PGT)
- Postal code: 111
- HDI (2021): 0.729 high · 1st of 22
- Website: ncdc.gov.pg

Port Moresby (/ˈmɔːrzbi/; Tok Pisin: Pot Mosbi), also referred to as Pom City or simply Moresby, is the capital and largest city of Papua New Guinea. It is one of the largest cities in the southwestern Pacific (along with Jayapura) outside of Australia and New Zealand. It is located on the shores of the Coral Sea, on the south-western coast of the Papuan Peninsula of the island of New Guinea. The city emerged as a trade centre in the second half of the 19th century. During World War II, it was a prime objective for conquest by the Imperial Japanese forces during 1942–1943 as a staging point and air base to cut off Australia from Southeast Asia and the Americas. Due to its population and outsized influence compared to other cities in Papua New Guinea, Port Moresby may be regarded as a primate city.

As of the 2011 census, Port Moresby had 364,145 inhabitants. This grew to 756,754 at the 2024 census. The place where the city was founded has been inhabited by the Motu-Koitabu people for centuries. The first Briton to see it was Royal Navy Captain John Moresby in 1873. It was named in honour of his father, Admiral of the Fleet Sir Fairfax Moresby.

Although Port Moresby is surrounded by Central Province, of which it is also the capital, it is not part of that province but instead forms the National Capital District. The traditional landowners, the Motu and Koitabu people, are represented by the Motu Koita Assembly.

Port Moresby hosted the APEC summit in November 2018. However, there were concerns about security, given the capital's reputation for violent crime.

== History ==
=== Discovery by Europeans ===
In February 1873, the territory was discovered by the crew of HMS Basilisk, surveying the southern shore of New Guinea. Captain John Moresby named the harbour in honour of his father Fairfax Moresby and called the anchorage off Paga Hill "Port Moresby" on his charts. Europeans estimated the local population to be around 2000 people. The largest settlement, Hanuabada, consisted of five villages, populated by Motu and Koita people. The Motu were originally coastal dwellers, while the Koita came from the hills inland. There was significant intermarriage between these two groups. They were organised into units called iduhu, which are somewhat similar to clans.

In November 1873, four Polynesian teachers were sent to Port Moresby by the Reverend Samuel Macfarlane of the London Missionary Society. In November 1874, they were joined by the Reverend William George Lawes, who immediately built a mission house at Metoreia, opposite Elevala Island. Port Moresby was an important centre of trade, visited by distant tribes of New Guinea, which the missionaries hoped would help them reach more people.

In September 1877, a Pacific Islander working for the naturalist and collector Andrew Goldie found signs of gold at the junction of the Laloki and Goldie Rivers, within walking distance of Port Moresby. Anticipating a gold rush, entrepreneur William Bairstow Ingham set off from Cooktown in January 1878 to set up a store at Port Moresby. Around 100 miners had arrived since April, but most of them left by the end of the year, finding no gold and suffering from diseases.

=== Colonisation ===
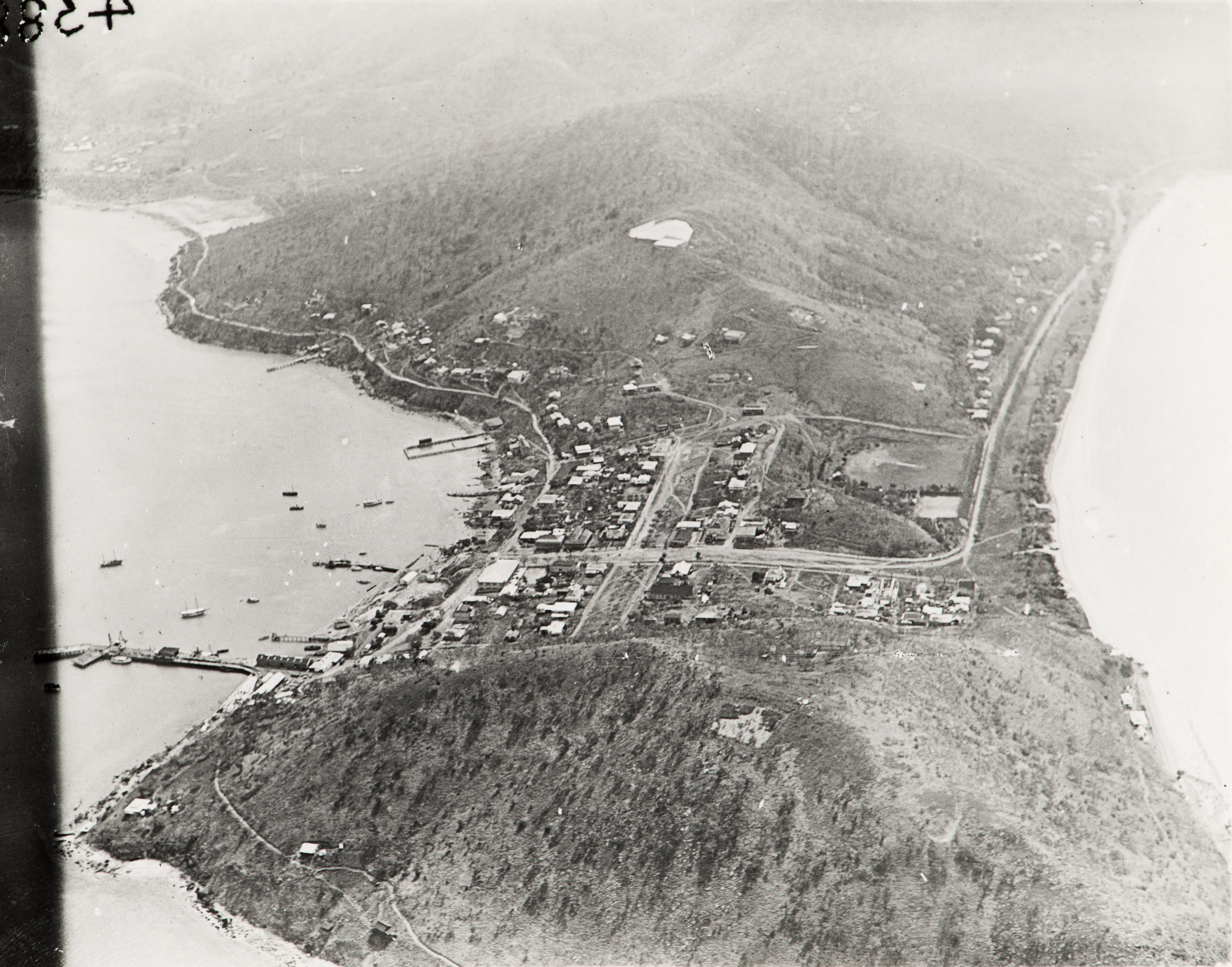
Aerial photo of Port Moresby, Papua New Guinea, 1921

In March 1883, Sir Thomas McIlwraith, the Premier of Queensland, heard the story that German SMS Carola was about to leave Sydney for the South Seas "with object of annexation". On 20 March, he ordered Henry Chester, the police magistrate at Thursday Island, to sail for New Guinea and "take formal possession in Her Majesty's name of whole of the Island with exception of that portion in occupation of the Dutch". On 4 April, the Union Jack was raised at Port Moresby, and Chester read his proclamation in the presence of thirteen Europeans and about 200 Papuans.

The annexation was rejected by the imperial authorities, which expected the Australian colonies to share the expenses jointly. In May 1884, the Earl of Derby requested the colonies to provide £15,000 annually for the administration of New Guinea, which they agreed. On 10 October, Commodore James Erskine was cabled orders to proclaim the protectorate over the south-eastern coast of New Guinea. Deputy Commissioner for the Western Pacific Hugh Romilly, who also received a telegram from Lord Derby, proclaimed the protectorate in a short statement at Port Moresby on 23 October. Unknown to him, Erskine was also on his way to the island. Commodore held a grand ceremony of his own on 6 November, leaving Romilly in charge of the protectorate.

Special Commissioner Peter Scratchley arrived at Port Moresby in August 1885, choosing the site as a location for the colonial capital. In September, a plot of land to the south from Hanuabada was acquired for the government bungalow. Twenty-eight locals were paid a tomahawk, a handkerchief and half a pound of tobacco each.

The administration began the policy of segregating non-indigenous residential areas, which continued until the early 1960s, and built a two-mile fence around the government land. In 1886, surveyor Walter Cuthbertson laid out a gridiron plan for townships Granville West, extending between the harbour and Ela Beach, and Granville East, to the south from the government bungalow. However, the settlement continued to be referred to as Port Moresby. Special Commissioner John Douglas wrote in 1887: "Granville West has assumed the appearance of a small township. Mr. Goldie's store is finished, and so are the Government Buildings, including the accommodation house, the customs house and post office, which at present does duty as a store, as well as the building erected."

After 1888 annexation, urban development continued to be concentrated on the saddle between Paga and Tuaguba hills. There were about twenty residential buildings in 1897. Granville East was practically undeveloped, with a single house at the top of Lawes Road until the late 1920s.

In 1905, the recently federated Australian government passed the Papua Act which came into effect in 1906. The act transferred Papua, with Port Moresby as its capital, to direct Australian rule. From then until 1941 Port Moresby grew slowly. The main growth was on the peninsula, where port facilities and other services were gradually improved. The first butcher's shop and grocery opened in 1909. By 1912, Port Moresby was linked by radio to Thursday Island. From 1921 to 1925, Papua was under the effect of the Commonwealth Navigation Act, which practically restricted trade to a single company, Burns Philp, and a single port, Sydney. Electricity was introduced in 1925. In the early 1930s, regular air service was established between Kila Airfield and Sydney. Piped water supply was provided in 1941.

=== World War II ===
The long-closed Burns Philp department store, in the mid-1990s having been used as a private school building

During World War II, some Papuan men enlisted in the Papua Infantry Battalion and others as carriers over trails and rough terrains (porters) as supply support to Allied and Japanese armies during long jungle marches. Historian William Manchester outlines in his biography of General Douglas MacArthur, American Caesar, that acting as porters was well down the natives' list of acceptable voluntary activities and that they would fade away without great inducements. Many Papuan residents of Port Moresby either returned to their family villages or were evacuated to camps when the threat of Japanese invasion loomed. By September 1942, the city was an important Allied complex of bases, and thousands of troops were stationed in the area or more often, staged through it, as it was the last Allied bastion on the island and, conversely, a key staging and jumping off point as the Allies began conducting offensive warfare themselves, pushing back the Japanese advances. General MacArthur located his headquarters in Port Moresby from November 1942 to October 1944.

In 1945, the Territory of Papua and New Guinea was formed when Papua and the former German New Guinea, which had been administered by Australia since 1918, were amalgamated under a single Australian administration though several laws remained in two territories and remain so, which can be complicating with provinces sitting on two sides of the otherwise extinct boundary. Port Moresby became the capital of the new combined territory and a focal point for the expansion of public services. Port Moresby was granted city status in 1972, with Oala Oala-Rarua becoming the first Lord Mayor.

=== Independence ===
Front side of the parliament building

In September 1975, Papua New Guinea became an independent country with Port Moresby as its capital city. Prince Charles, Prince of Wales, represented the Queen of Papua New Guinea at the celebrations. New government, intellectual and cultural buildings were constructed in the suburb of Waigani to supplement and replace those of downtown Port Moresby. They included those for government departments, including a National Parliament Building, which was opened in 1984 by Prince Charles and blends traditional design with modern building technology.

The Papua New Guinea National Museum and National Library are in Waigani. A mansion was built in Port Moresby just west of the old legislative building but the last pre-independence chief minister and first prime minister of the sovereign state declared it not nearly grand enough; it was made the residence of Australian high commissioners and a mansion suitable to Somare's demands was built in Waigani.

Several of the government buildings have been abandoned due to long-term neglect. Chief amongst these are Marea Haus (known to most locals as the "Pineapple Building") and the Central Government Offices. However, widespread restoration rather than demolition of long-disused office buildings has been carried out since the first decade of the 21st century. The legislative building before independence and the first parliament building was knocked down but the old court house in town Port Moresby remains, bearing its pre-independence label with its previous title.

The population of the Port Moresby area expanded rapidly after independence. In 1980, the census return registered a population of 120,000; by 1990, this had increased to 195,000.

== Climate ==
Moresby has a tropical savanna climate (Köppen: Aw) with relatively constant temperatures throughout the year. Port Moresby's average yearly rainfall is 898.8 millimetres or 35.39 inches, making it the driest place in New Guinea.

The wet season starts in December and ends in May; the dry season covers the remaining six months. This is due to the south-easterly trade winds running parallel to the coast, and the city being surrounded by high mountains. The average high temperatures range from 28 to 32 °C (82.4 to 89.6 °F) depending on time of year, while the average low temperature shows very little seasonal variation, hovering around the 23 °C (73.4 °F) mark. It tends to be slightly cooler in the city during the dry season.

Climate data for Port Moresby, Papua New Guinea
Month	Jan	Feb	Mar	Apr	May	Jun	Jul	Aug	Sep	Oct	Nov	Dec	Year
Record high °C (°F)	36.2 (97.2)	36.1 (97.0)	35.4 (95.7)	34.2 (93.6)	33.8 (92.8)	33.9 (93.0)	33.3 (91.9)	33.8 (92.8)	34.8 (94.6)	35.5 (95.9)	36.3 (97.3)	36.3 (97.3)	36.3 (97.3)
Mean daily maximum °C (°F)	32.1 (89.8)	31.6 (88.9)	31.4 (88.5)	31.3 (88.3)	31.0 (87.8)	30.3 (86.5)	29.9 (85.8)	30.3 (86.5)	31.0 (87.8)	32.0 (89.6)	32.5 (90.5)	32.4 (90.3)	31.3 (88.3)
Daily mean °C (°F)	27.4 (81.3)	27.3 (81.1)	27.1 (80.8)	27.0 (80.6)	26.9 (80.4)	26.1 (79.0)	25.7 (78.3)	26.1 (79.0)	26.5 (79.7)	27.5 (81.5)	27.6 (81.7)	27.8 (82.0)	26.9 (80.4)
Mean daily minimum °C (°F)	23.7 (74.7)	23.5 (74.3)	23.4 (74.1)	23.5 (74.3)	23.5 (74.3)	23.1 (73.6)	22.4 (72.3)	22.6 (72.7)	23.2 (73.8)	23.5 (74.3)	23.6 (74.5)	23.7 (74.7)	23.3 (73.9)
Record low °C (°F)	20.4 (68.7)	18.8 (65.8)	18.3 (64.9)	16.8 (62.2)	14.5 (58.1)	14.5 (58.1)	10.4 (50.7)	14.8 (58.6)	14.4 (57.9)	16.3 (61.3)	16.0 (60.8)	19.6 (67.3)	10.4 (50.7)
Average rainfall mm (inches)	192.2 (7.57)	140.6 (5.54)	189.8 (7.47)	105.2 (4.14)	56.2 (2.21)	21.6 (0.85)	13.8 (0.54)	12.0 (0.47)	14.4 (0.57)	15.2 (0.60)	40.0 (1.57)	97.8 (3.85)	898.8 (35.38)
Average rainy days (≥ 0.1 mm)	18	16	18	11	9	6	4	4	5	5	6	12	114
Average relative humidity (%)	79	81	81	82	81	79	77	76	76	76	75	77	78
Mean monthly sunshine hours	182	158	184	200	211	200	203	222	213	231	243	216	2,463
Source 1: World Meteorological Organization
Source 2: Deutscher Wetterdienst (extremes, mean temperature, humidity and sun) (Note: Station ID for Port Moresby is 92035 Use this station ID to locate the sunshine duration)

== District, LLGs and suburbs ==
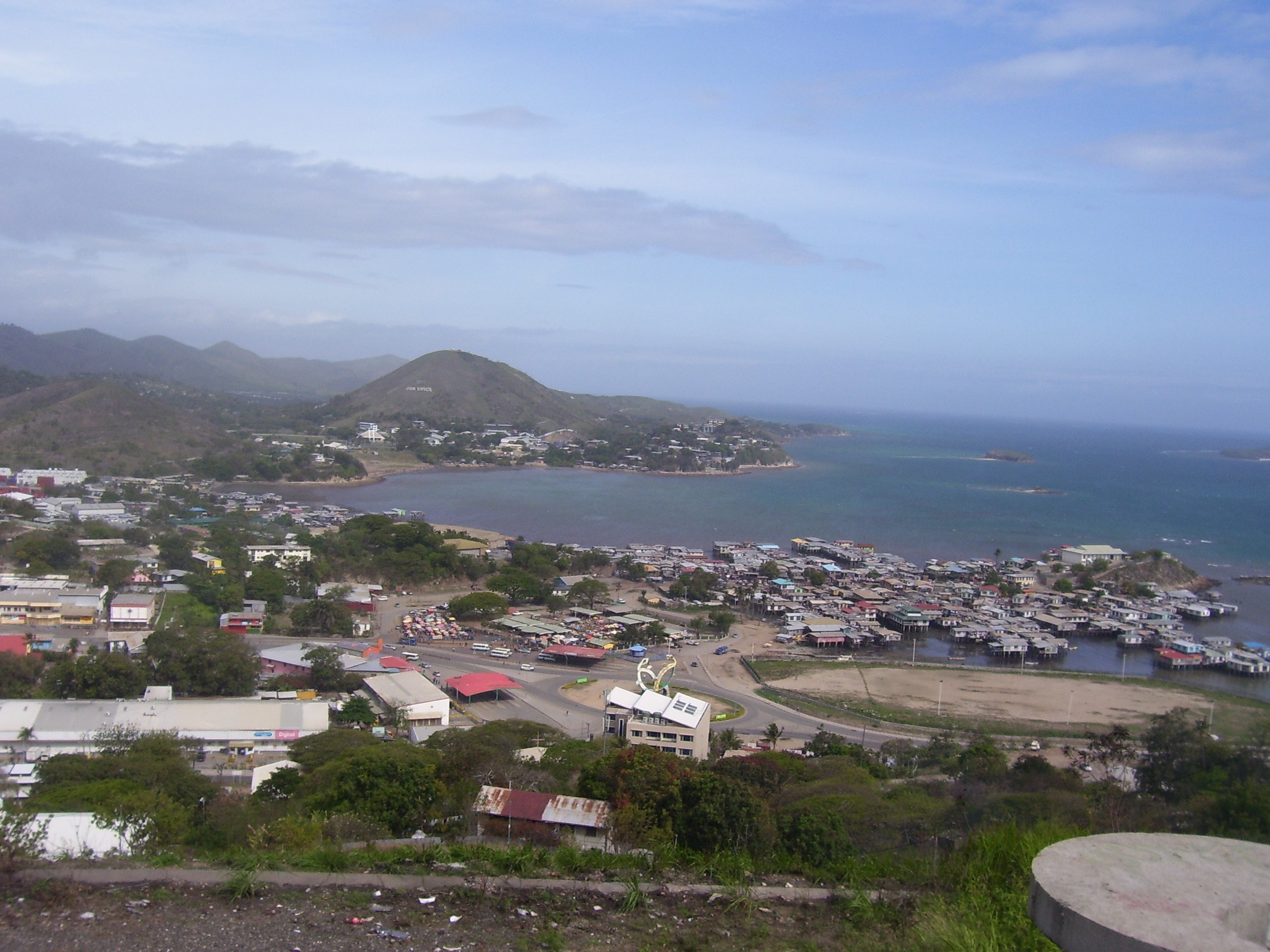
Walter Bay from hills immediately east of downtown Port Moresby

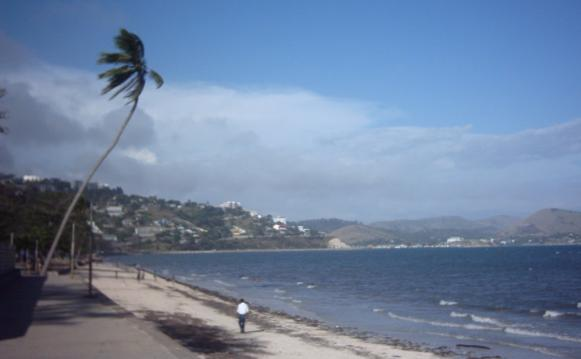
Ela Beach

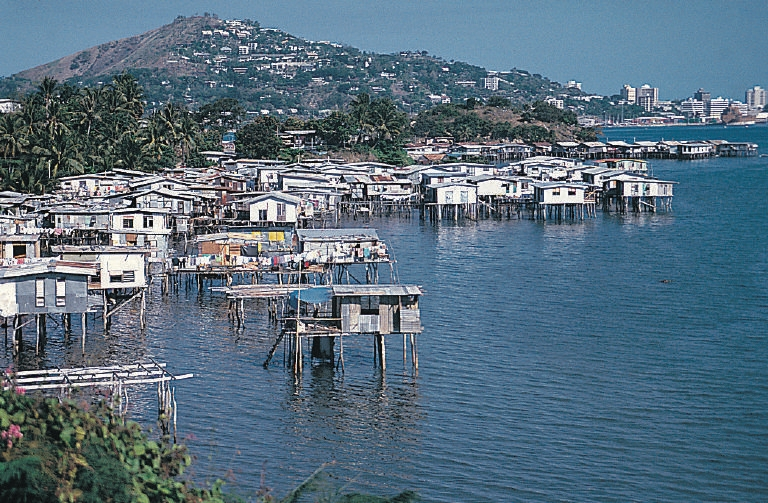
Coastal housing at Hanuabada in Port Moresby

Port Moresby is the single district of the National Capital District, which contains three Local Level Government (LLG) areas. For census purposes, the LLG areas are subdivided into wards and those into census units.

District	District Capital	LLG
National Capital District	Port Moresby	Moresby North-East
National Capital District	Port Moresby	Moresby North-West
National Capital District	Port Moresby	Moresby South

The National Capital District machinery of government also incorporates the Motu Koita Assembly, established by an act of parliament to represent the traditional landowners of Port Moresby, the Motu and Koitabu people. The Assembly governs the traditional lands and inhabitants of the ten recognised villages, and is the only entity of its kind in Papua New Guinea. The Chair of the Motu Koita Assembly also holds the position of Deputy Governor of the National Capital District.

Port Moresby refers to both the urbanised area of the National Capital District and more specifically to the main business area, known locally as "Town".

Since the 1990s the original town centre has ceased to have restaurants and night life, though it is very successful and prosperous-looking as an office centre. The affluent housing region north of downtown along and up from the coast remains so, though there are now few modest residential houses, most of which are replaced with substantial mansions and apartment buildings.

The suburb of Boroko, once the commercial heart of Port Moresby, is very idle, with many former shopping buildings now empty; the west is full of high rises, shopping centres and affluent housing. Other neighbourhoods of Port Moresby include Koki, with its popular fresh produce market, Newtown, Konedobu, Kaevaga, Badili, Gabutu, Kila Kila, Matirogo, Three Mile, Kaugere, Sabama, Korobosea, Four Mile, Hohola, Hohola North, Boroko, Gordons, Gordons North, Erima, Saraga, Waigani, Morata and Gerehu.

=== Villages ===
Villages within Port Moresby include:

- Hanuabada, which offers a safe haven for LGBT people in PNG
- Kira Kira village (sometimes spelt Kirakira), the home town of Australian footballer Mary Fowler's mother

== Crime ==
In 2021, Al Jazeera describes Port Moresby as "one of the most dangerous cities in the world". ABC Australia reports that "many homes have big fences covered in metal sheeting, locked gates and internal steel security doors." Travel by foot is not recommended in and about the city and suburbs due to continuing breakdown in law and order. The UN Global Compact Cities Programme, using a method called Circles of Sustainability, has assessed the urban security of Port Moresby as 'critical'.

== Transport ==
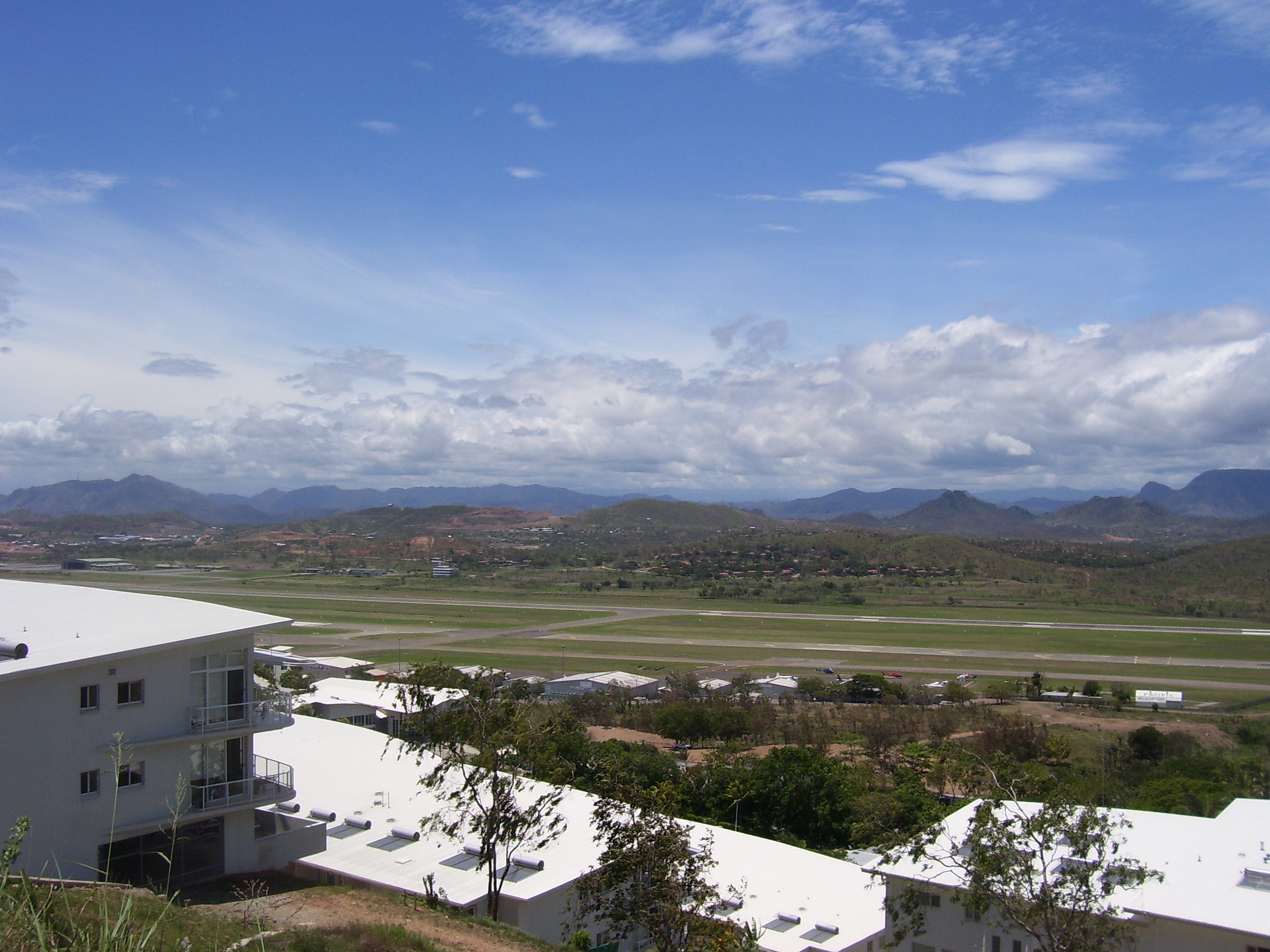
Jacksons International Airport, looking east across the airstrip

Port Moresby is served within the city by buses and privately owned taxis. Flights are vital for transport about the country, highways not being widely available. Port Moresby is served by Jacksons International Airport, the biggest international airport and Papua New Guinea Defence Force Air Wing base in the country.

As the national highway system is not fully linked, there are many internal flights to other towns, such as Lae and Madang, which have no direct road connection to Port Moresby.

== Economy ==
Papua New Guinea (PNG) is rich in natural resources, which account for two thirds of its export earnings. Though PNG is filled with resources, the lack of development led foreign countries to take over some sites. Continuing foreign demand for PNG's resources led the United States to set up an oil company that began to export in 2004. This was the largest project in PNG's history. The project increased the potential to triple PNG's export revenue. Papua New Guinea gained much assistance from Australia and was offered two hundred million dollars a year in aid, and many countries such as Singapore, Japan and China have also played a great part in PNG's industry business. The decision to host the 2018 APEC meeting, brought a large number of world leaders to Port Moresby.

There has been substantial building of housing, office towers, shopping malls and commercial establishments over much of the city. The waterfront area has been completely redeveloped with apartments, restaurants and shopping centres. Sporting facilities were upgraded significantly for the 2015 Pacific Games, and further development took place in preparation for the 2016 FIFA Under-20 Women's World Cup.

Air Niugini, the national airline of Papua New Guinea, and PNG Air, the second biggest airline in the country, have their head offices on the grounds of Jacksons International Airport.

== Sports ==
The 1969 South Pacific Games, held from 13 to 23 August 1969 at Port Moresby, were the third South Pacific Games to be held. A total of 1,150 athletes participated.

The 1991 South Pacific Games held from 7–21 September 1991 at Port Moresby and along Lae were the ninth South Pacific Games to be held. This was the first time that events at one games had been held in two cities. The decision to do so was to allow both locations to benefit from the construction of new facilities.

Cricket PNG is the official governing body of the sport of cricket in Papua New Guinea. Its headquarters is in Port Moresby. Cricket PNG is Papua New Guinea's representative at the International Cricket Council and is an associate member and has been a member of that body since 1973. It is also a member of the East Asia-Pacific Cricket Council.

The city hosted the 2017 FIBA Melanesia Basketball Cup, where the Papua New Guinea national basketball team won the gold medal.

The city is home to the Port Moresby Vipers rugby league team who play in the Papua New Guinea National Rugby League. The National football stadium is also home to the PNG Hunters, a rugby league team that compete in the majority Australian Queensland Cup.

=== 2015 Pacific Games ===
The 2015 Pacific Games were held in Port Moresby from 4 to 18 July 2015. In September 2009, the Pacific Games Council, at its meeting coinciding with the 2009 Pacific Mini Games, elected Port Moresby as the host of the 2015 Games. The final vote was 25–22 in favour of Port Moresby over Tonga.

The 2015 Pacific Games involved 24 countries from the Pacific regions competing in 28 sports events, including: basketball, soccer, touch rugby, table tennis, weightlifting, triathlon, swimming, cricket, squash, shooting, sailing, va'a, rugby 7s, powerlifting, rugby league 9s, volleyball, beach volleyball, athletics, hockey, netball, karate, lawn bowls, bodybuilding, boxing, softball, taekwondo, golf, and canoeing. Papua New Guinea ranked first with the most medals followed by New Caledonia and Tahiti.

The opening ceremony took place on 4 July 2015 involving various traditional dances. The closing ceremony involved singers such as J Boog, Fiji, O-Shen and George Mamua Telek.

=== Sports venues ===
- Sir John Guise Stadium is the premier sports venue with a capacity of 15,000. It was completely rebuilt in 2015.
- Amini Park is a cricket ground in Port Moresby. The ground is named for the Amini family, several of whom have played cricket for Papua New Guinea (both the men's and women's teams), the ground has seen the men's team play Australia, the West Indies and Victoria. The women's team played Japan in a three match series at the ground in September 2006.
- Lloyd Robson Oval is a sporting ground in Port Moresby and has hosted 3 games for the 1989–1992 Rugby League World Cup. It has been the home ground for the Papua New Guinea national rugby league team since 1975 and the Port Moresby Vipers. It has a total capacity of approximately 17,000.
- National Football Stadium – Papua New Guinea's National Football Stadium, formerly known as Lloyd Robson Oval, is located in Port Moresby and hosted three matches for the 2017 Rugby League World Cup. The venue (Loyd Robson Oval) was completely redeveloped in 2015 and has an all-seated capacity of 15,000. This was completed in time for the Pacific Games.

The venue has hosted the PNG national side since 1975 and has previously hosted Rugby League World Cup matches in 1986 and 1990. It is also home of the Hunters, the local Papua New Guinea team who play in the Intrust Super Cup which is the Queensland NRL tournament. The National Football Stadium features a permanent main grandstand with seating for 3,000 including a roof and corporate facilities while temporary stands around the ground boost the seating capacity. There are also lights and a video screen.

- PMRL Stadium is a football stadium in Port Moresby and it is used mainly for football and hosts the home matches of PRK Hekari United of the Papua New Guinea National Soccer League and OFC Champions League. The stadium has a seating capacity of 15,000 spectators.
- Hubert Murray Stadium is a sports venue located in Port Moresby and was developed for the 1969 South Pacific Games on reclaimed land at Konedobu that had previously been shoreline mangroves. The athletics events and the opening and closing ceremonies were held at the new stadium, which was named after Sir Hubert Murray, a former lieutenant governor. In 2015–16 it was completely rebuilt as a large-capacity football ground.

== Education ==
=== International schools ===
The International Education Agency provides private education via six international schools; Korobosea International School, Boroko International School, Ela Murray International School, Gordon International School, Port Moresby International School and IEA TAFE college. There are approximately 300 staff.

The Port Moresby International School (POMIS) has been operating since the 1950s. It is an International Education Agency school and is the premier international high school in Port Moresby. It enrolls nearly 1,000 students from Grades 7 to 12.

Port Moresby Japanese Language School (ポート・モレスビー補習授業校 Pōto Moresubī Hoshū Jugyō Kō) was a supplementary Japanese school in the city. It closed in August 2009.

== Twin towns – sister cities ==
Port Moresby is twinned with:

- Jinan, China
- Suva, Fiji
- Townsville, Australia
- Long Beach, United States

== See also ==
- Naval Base Port Moresby
- Port Moresby Airfield Complex
