= 2018 Papua New Guinea earthquake =

Earthquake affecting Papua New Guinea

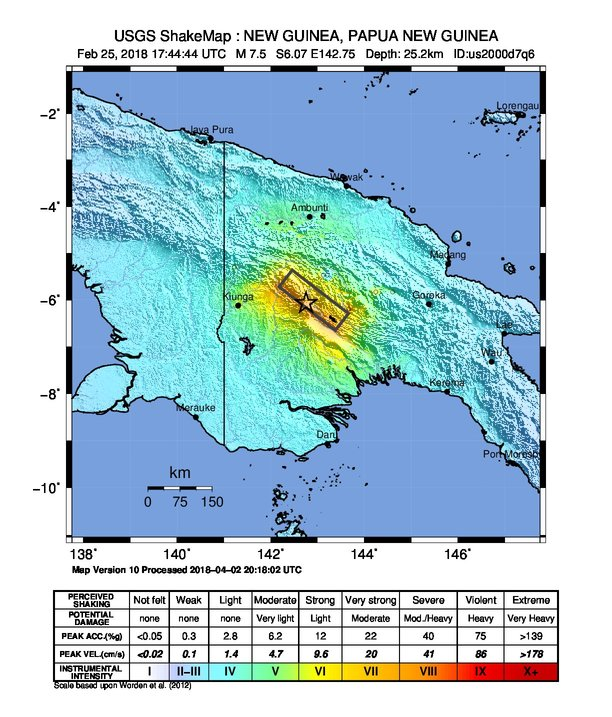
- USGS shakemap for the event

- Location within Papua New Guinea
- UTC time: 2018-02-25 17:44:44
- ISC event: 615000068
- USGS-ANSS: ComCat
- Local date: 26 February 2018
- Local time: 03:44:44
- Magnitude: 7.5 M_{w}
- Depth: 25.2 km (15.7 mi)
- Epicenter: 6.070°S 142.754°E
- Type: Thrust fault
- Areas affected: Papua New Guinea, Indonesia
- Total damage: Building and infrastructure damage, sinkholes, landslides
- Max. intensity: MMI IX (Violent)
- Landslides: Yes
- Aftershocks: 239 (As of October 1, 2018); Strongest is 6.7 M_{w}
- Casualties: 160 dead, ≥500 injured

The Papua New Guinea earthquake was a magnitude 7.5 earthquake that occurred in the Hela Province of Papua New Guinea on 26 February 2018 (25 February UTC), at 3:44 a.m. local time (25 February, 17:44 UTC). The earthquake's epicenter was 10 kilometres (6.2 mi) west of the town of Komo. The maximum felt intensity was IX (Violent) on the Mercalli intensity scale. A total of 160 people were killed and many others were injured. An aftershock of M6.0 killed 11 people on 4 March, while another aftershock of M6.7 occurred at 00:13 local time on 7 March, killing at least 25 more. A 6.3 aftershock killed another 4 people on 7 April, more than a month after the first tremors hit the area.

== Tectonic setting ==
Papua New Guinea lies within the complex zone of collision between the Australian plate and the Pacific plate, which converge at a rate of 107 mm per year at the earthquake's location. The Papuan fold and thrust belt, which is responsible for the mountainous New Guinea Highlands, forms the boundary between the Stable Platform area to the south and the Mobile Belt to the north. The Stable Platform consists of little deformed continental crust of the Australian plate. The Mobile Belt consists of a series of arc terranes and continental fragments previously accreted to the Australian plate. Current convergence across the fold and thrust belt are estimated at up to 15 mm per year. The thrusting is thick-skinned in type, involving reverse reactivation of much older extensional faults.

== Earthquake ==
The main shock struck at a depth of 25.2 km below the northern slopes of Mt. Sisa, and was followed by a 5.5 M_{b} aftershock less than 30 minutes later. The Geohazards Management Division in Port Moresby characterized it as "typical for the Papuan fold and thrust belt".

=== Aftershocks ===
There have been more than 270 aftershocks reported by USGS in total, 68 of which were above magnitude 5, and 6 of which were above magnitude 6.

List of major earthquakes (M≥5.0) Earthquakes above magnitude 6 are in bold.
No.	Date (UTC)	Magnitude	Depth (km)	Remarks
**1**	**2018-02-25 17:44**	**7.5**	**25.2**	**Main shock**
2	2018-02-25 18:11	5.7	10.0	
3	2018-02-25 18:15	5.0	10.0	
3	2018-02-25 18:26	5.4	35.0	
4	2018-02-25 18:47	5.0	35.0	
5	2018-02-25 19:40	5.3	35.0	
6	2018-02-25 20:17	5.2	35.0	
7	2018-02-25 21:11	5.0	35.0	
8	2018-02-25 21:47	5.2	16.6	
9	2018-02-25 22:19	5.0	35.0	
10	2018-02-25 22:28	5.0	35.0	
11	2018-02-25 22:57	5.0	35.0	
12	2018-02-26 02:25	5.0	35.0	
13	2018-02-26 03:10	5.0	35.0	
14	2018-02-26 03:12	5.2	35.0	
15	2018-02-26 05:28	5.0	10.8	
16	2018-02-26 07:01	5.1	35.0	
**17**	**2018-02-26 08:26**	**6.0**	**23.6**	
18	2018-02-26 09:19	5.0	60.3	
19	2018-02-26 11:56	5.7	13.3	
20	2018-02-26 12:29	5.0	40.0	
21	2018-02-26 12:34	5.2	26.7	
**22**	**2018-02-26 15:17**	**6.2**	**13.8**	
23	2018-02-26 17:41	5.1	10.0	
24	2018-02-26 18:28	5.5	31.0	
25	2018-02-26 19:21	5.1	21.2	
26	2018-02-26 21:52	5.0	10.0	
27	2018-02-27 00:08	5.1	10.0	
28	2018-02-27 00:55	5.0	10.0	
29	2018-02-27 02:15	5.2	10.0	
30	2018-02-27 06:19	5.6	10.0	
31	2018-02-27 07:19	5.2	10.0	
32	2018-02-27 13:58	5.0	14.7	
33	2018-02-27 14:11	5.0	14.4	
34	2018-02-27 16:19	5.2	10.0	
35	2018-02-27 20:11	5.2	10.0	
**36**	**2018-02-28 02:45**	**6.1**	**16.0**	
37	2018-02-28 05:22	5.2	10.0	
38	2018-02-28 14:00	5.0	10.0	
39	2018-03-02 00:57	5.0	10.0	
40	2018-03-02 03:01	5.6	28.7	
41	2018-03-02 07:59	5.1	10.0	
42	2018-03-02 21:30	5.1	41.9	
43	2018-03-04 11:44	5.1	10.0	
44	2018-03-04 12:40	5.4	22.6	
45	2018-03-04 14:33	5.8	6.0	
**46**	**2018-03-04 19:56**	**6.0**	**10.0**	11 killed
47	2018-03-06 02:52	5.0	10.0	
48	2013-03-06 03:26	5.3	10.0	
**49**	**2018-03-06 14:13**	**6.7**	**22.9**	25 killed
50	2018-03-06 14:40	5.1	10.0	
51	2018-03-06 14:50	5.2	10.0	
52	2018-03-06 15:35	5.2	10.0	
53	2018-03-06 17:32	5.0	16.6	
54	2018-03-06 19:18	5.1	35.9	
55	2018-03-07 18:11	5.0	10.0	
56	2018-03-08 03:33	5.3	10.0	
57	2018-03-08 04:59	5.0	50.4	
58	2018-03-15 18:58	5.0	10.0	
59	2018-03-23 11:52	5.3	59.5	
60	2018-03-28 18:50	5.0	10.0	
61	2018-03-29 16:06	5.0	10.0	
62	2018-04-07 02:56	5.3	10.0	
**63**	**2018-04-07 05:48**	**6.3**	**10.0**	4 killed
64	2018-04-09 02:18	5.1	10.0	
65	2018-04-13 03:57	5.0	12.9	
66	2018-04-16 06:09	5.1	10.0	
67	2018-05-05 20:24	5.0	10.0	
69	2018-06-29 01:55	5.3	52.5	

== Impact ==
=== Papua New Guinea ===
A total of 160 people were reported to have been killed, while over 500 others were injured. Hela Province had at least 80 confirmed deaths, while 45 casualties were reported from the Southern Highlands Province. Thousands of houses were destroyed. Komo's airport runway was severely affected. Homes and properties were buried as the ground opened up and sank. There were 14 deaths in Mendi, while 18 people were killed in the Bosavi-Kutubu area.

=== Indonesia ===
The quake and its aftershocks caused panic in Jayapura, the capital of Indonesia's Papua province. The country's National Board for Disaster Management later confirmed that 12 buildings were damaged in the Boven Digoel Regency, including a mosque, a military post, and a district office. Landslides also blocked and damaged roads.

=== Aftershocks ===
On 4 March, a M6.0 aftershock killed 11 people after a landslide buried the small village of Huya. A further 25 people were reported killed by a M6.7 aftershock on 7 March. A M6.3 aftershock on 7 April caused more damage, and four people were killed when houses collapsed in Tari.

== Aftermath ==
On the morning of 26 February, ExxonMobil announced that they would temporarily shut down the Hides gas field conditioning plant, situated about 8 kilometres (5.0 mi) from the epicenter, in order to assess damage. Officials later confirmed that all of the staff were "safe and accounted for", while the administration buildings, living quarters, and mess hall had all sustained damage. The company was planning on evacuating all non-essential personnel. Flights into the Komo airfield were temporarily suspended until the runway could be surveyed. Sinkholes and landslides were reported across the affected areas, with electricity supplies also being disrupted. On 10 March, ExxonMobil officials announced that the Hides facility will not be operational for at least 8 weeks, a significant economic loss for the country.

Papua New Guinea's largest oil and gas exploration and development company Oil Search also announced it would shut down production in the Southern Highlands until it could ensure the safety of its employees. The Porgera Gold Mine suffered damage to its gas and electricity infrastructure, while landslips blocked the access road to the Ok Tedi Mine and damaged parts of the highway between Tabubil and Kiunga in the Western Province.

A week after the quake, International Red Cross and Red Crescent Movement officials estimated that 150,000 people were in urgent need of emergency supplies, with food and clean water among the biggest concerns. Lack of road access and landslides were hampering deliveries in the area. By 7 March the number of displaced people had risen to 17,000, with continuing problems due to damaged roads and communication difficulties. The first UNDAC situational overview was released on 10 March, prepared in collaboration with local and international agencies. Over 544,000 people were reported to be affected by the quake, with half of them being targeted for assistance, and more than 26,000 displaced across the western parts of the country. On 15 March, nearly three weeks after the earthquake, UNICEF estimated that 275,000 people were in need of urgent humanitarian assistance, including 125,000 children.

== Response ==
The government of Papua New Guinea dispatched disaster assessment teams to parts of the Southern Highlands and Hela provinces following the earthquake. Members of the Papua New Guinea Defence Force were also mobilised to assist with the delivery of supplies to affected people, as well as the restoration of services and infrastructure. A state of emergency was declared on 1 March for the provinces of Hela, Southern Highlands, Enga and Western, together with a promise of 450 million kina (about 138 million US$) to help deal with the aftermath of the quake. On 8 March, the country's Commerce and Industry Minister Wera Mori estimated that reconstruction will cost at least 600 million kina (about 185 million US$). In addition to the four provinces under a state of emergency, Gulf Province was also discovered to be seriously affected in the quake's aftermath.

The Australian government promised $AU 200,000 in aid and sent a C-130 Hercules aircraft for aerial surveys. The first shipment of supplies arrived at Moro Airport on 3 March. Four days later the country pledged a further 1,000,000 US$ in support of vulnerable women and children in the earthquake-affected areas, as well as three CH-47 Chinook helicopters and additional Australian Defence Force personnel.

The New Zealand government sent two Lockheed C-130 Hercules planes carrying hygiene kits, shelter supplies, water containers and tarpaulins. The government of China donated over 2.8 million kina (about 880,000 US$) in the weeks after the disaster. On 8 March 40 electricity generators were delivered from Israel.

The Red Cross released $221,000 in funds and announced it would send first aid, water, mosquito nets and shelters to the stricken areas. ExxonMobil donated $1,000,000 to relief efforts, and allowed the government to use its experts, resources and helicopters in the recovery process, while Santos Limited released a total of $1,200,000 to the Hela Provincial Hospital and aid agencies working in Papua New Guinea. Bank South Pacific donated 1 million kina (about 310,000 US$) to the emergency relief and reconstruction fund.

By 16 March, the total amount of cash donations had reached 150 million kina (about 46 million US$), with the government announcing it had already committed about one third of them to humanitarian aid and road reconstruction.

== See also ==
- List of earthquakes in 2018
- List of earthquakes in Papua New Guinea
