= Natural gas in Papua New Guinea =

Papua New Guinea has exported liquefied natural gas (LNG) since 2014. The LNG sector is important to PNG's economy with US$2.95 billion in exports in 2020, and accounting for 5.25% of the GDP in 2019. On a global scale, PNG is a minor player, with 0.08% of world reserves. In 2020, PNG was ranked 16th on the list of gas exporting countries.

There are five LNG projects in PNG; only the Hides Project is fully operational. An agreement was made between the PNG government and a consortium of companies to develop the second project: the "Elk/Antelope" field. These companies cooperate under the Papua-LNG project. The development of the third project, the "P'nyang Gas Field", is in an advanced planning stage. The fourth LNG project in development is the "Western Gas" field. The fifth Pasca gas field is offshore. The benefits of LNG development for the country is a controversial issue. Government participation in the projects is controversial and has been a dominant theme in PNG politics in the past decade. It became a major issue in the events leading to the resignation of Peter O'Neill as prime minister.

== Liquid Niugini LNG (PNG LNG) ==
The Hides gas field is the main field operated by PNG LNG and was discovered in 1987 by BP, who sold it to Oil Search. Originally, the idea was to transport the gas through a pipeline to Australia. Chevron was the big fossil fuel company that would carry it forward. It came close to a production phase but the project was dropped in 2007 after Australian customers dropped out of the conditional sales agreements. At present Australia exports a manifold of LNG compared to PNG and the project would not be of interest for that market anymore. In 2008, ExxonMobil assumed leadership to develop a gas project sourcing the Hides gas field to export LNG to the Asian market. The project was completed in 2014 after rapidly completing planning and construction phases:

- 2008 (a): Cooperating partners came to an agreement. Shareholding in LNG/PNG is distributed as follows: ExxonMobil (32.2%); Oil Search (29%); Kumul Petroleum Holdings, representing the PNG government, (16.2%); Santos (13.5%); Mineral Resources Development Company (MRDC), representing landowners, (2.8%); JXTG Nippon Oil & Energy (4.7%). Santos bought Oil Search in 2021 and thus their share in LNG/PNG rose to 42.3%. Santos intends to sell part of its stake in LUN/PNG as it does not want to be exposed in Papua New Guinea and it wants to leave ExxonMobil as the major partner. Prime Minister Marape as well as minister Kerenge Kua indicated that they want to expand government shareholding in LNG/PNG. They expect to acquire a stake for a low price or potentially via a loan.
- 2008 (b): The fiscal and legal environment was established through a Gas agreement between the participating partners: ExxonMobil, Oil Search, Santos, Nippon Oil, the IPBC, MRDC and the government of PNG. It also laid down the proposed government equity in the project.
- 2008 (c): An economics impact study was commissioned by ExxonMobil from the Australian consulting firm Acil-Tasman. It outlined many beneficial effects of the project for PNG.
- 2008 (d): At the end of the year the FEED (Front End engineering and Design) stage was reached.
- 2009 (a): In October agreement was reached on environmental impact with the PNG government, The environmental impact statement was based on 16 studies.
- 2009 (b): Final agreement among partners paving the way for production.
- 2010: Sales and marketing agreements were completed with four major customers: JERA (for the Tokyo Electric Power Company); Osaka Gas, Sinopec (China Petroleum and chemical Corporation); CPC Corporation, Taiwan
- 2011: Financing arrangements with the lenders to the project completed. The project was heavily geared. Loan capital (US$14 billion) was much bigger than share capital (US$3.3. billion) These loans were sourced in the first place from export credit agencies and were therefore government-guaranteed (US$8.3 billion). Commercial Banks were the second source for loan capital (US$1.95 billion). Third, Exxon Mobil, the company executing the project, lent money (US$3.95 billion).
- 2009-2014: The construction of the LNG project consisted of a distinct number of sub-projects. Seven gas fields supply the project; the primary field is the Hides gas field in Hela Province. It required drilling eight boreholes 3600 m deep. A gas conditioning plant was built in Hides where the gas is separated from oil and water. The gas is then transported to the coast for shipping, which required a pipeline of 450 km to the mouth of the Omati River. This pipeline was extended under water for 407 km to Caution Bay near where the LNG processing plant is in Port Moresby. At Caution Bay, gas is chilled to -161 °C to liquefy it for transportation. Two processing plants – called trains – were built. Two huge storage tanks were built auxiliary to this. A loading pier for LNG tankers was constructed. The Hides gas field produces a mixture of oil and gas (condensate). The oil is separated in the highlands and transported in a separate pipeline to Oil Search's loading facilities for the oilfield at Lake Kutubu: the Kumul Marine Terminal offshore in Gulf Province. The construction of these projects was in extremely difficult terrain consisting either of very steep mountain ranges in the highlands or swamps near the coast. The project built at Hides a special long runway that could take the Antonov An-225 Mriya – the largest cargo planes in the world – to bring in material as road transport could not cope with this. Oil Search acquired the management contract for the Hides installations and Exxon Mobil managed the installations at Caution Bay.

=== Project achievements ===
- The construction of PNG/LNG is a major engineering achievement: it was a massive project in difficult terrain. The project was completed ahead of schedule in 2014, though there was an expenditure overshoot of US$3.3 billion.
- The project required PNG citizens to be extensively trained: 10,000 citizens during the time of construction. The project employed 2,600 citizens after construction and they constituted 82 percent of the workforce; 22 percent were women.
- The project produced above-planned capacity: The original design of PNG/LNG aimed at a capacity of producing 6.9 million tons energy (MTE) per annum, but the actual output has after the first year of production consistently been above that. In 2017 production was 8.3 MTE. It dropped to 7.4 MTE in 2018 because damage due to an earthquake . This was followed by another record year in 2019 producing 8.5 MTE. Production in 2021 was 7.7 MTE
- The project is an inexpensive producer. According to an analysis by consulting firm Wood Mackenzie and Credit Suisse, the project's break-even price of around $7.40 per million British Thermal Units compares favorably to an average over $10 per million BTU for eight recent gas projects in the region.
- The project does focus on more than the major Hides gas field. Project gas is sourced from seven fields: The Hides, Angore, and Juha gas fields belong to the LNG/PNG concession. Only Hides is fully operational (2022). Angore is in development. Development on Juha has still to be started and the Oil Search-operated Kutubu, Agogo, Moran, and Gobe Main oil fields, provide approximately 20% of PNG LNG Project gas. Gas is also purchased on a third party basis from the SE Gobe field.march
- Gas field reserves were re-evaluated in 2016, which resulted in an estimated increase of 50% when compared with the estimates made before construction in 2009. The size of the Hides field is now estimated between 9 and 11 trillion cubic feet. The life expectancy of the field is estimated to be thirty years from 2014.

=== Negative aspects of the project ===
- Disappointing economic effects. ExxonMobil commissioned a study to Australian consulting firm ACIL-Tasman to calculate the benefits and costs to PNG; they projected large gains for the PNG economy as a result of the project. However, in a study commissioned by Jubilee Australia, two Australian economists – Paul Flanagan and Luke Fletcher – compared the predictions of this report in 2018 with actual outcomes. They found an actual fall in employment, household incomes, employment, government income, and imports where the ACIL-Tasman study predicted increases. GDP was expected to double as a result of LNG/PNG in the ACIL-Tasman study, but the researchers found a mere 10% growth. The Jubilee study has been criticised because the researchers did not produce a credible counterargument: What would have happened in the absence of the PNG LNG project and to what extent are the observed effects related to PNG LNG? Prime Minister Peter O'Neill rejected the Jubilee report and claimed low energy prices as the main factor. ExxonMobil responded by mentioning the social and economic benefits of the project such as stimulating entrepreneurship and supporting local communities.
- Tax concessions are too generous. Specific questions about the depreciation allowed and tax concessions were asked before the project began. Mekere Morauta challenged the exemption of General Sales Tax and interest withholding tax given to LNG PNG in parliament. The exemption of interest withholding tax is important as the project is highly geared and much income is needed to service these loans. Arthur Somare, the relevant minister at the time, stressed that a 30 percent corporation tax on profit remained despite these concessions. A second concern was raised by Aaron Batten while presenting a seminal report by the Asian Development Bank: "Papua New Guinea: Critical Development Constraints". He mentioned the taxation concessions to the LNG project. The Internal Revenue Commission argued that companies need the time to extract, produce, export, and sell their products before they can generate a continuous income that is taxable. However, the Internal Revenue gave no definite and precise information of income flows from LNG PNG. As a result of these concessions, substantial income was not expected until after 2020. The actual arrangements between government and companies are in a secret Resource Development Agreement. However, Flanagan and Fletcher suggested that Exxon and Oil Search should be paying AUD$500,000 to the PNG government every year, since the gas started to flow in 2014. Instead, they are paying a fraction of this amount, partly because of their use of tax havens in the Netherlands and the Bahamas as they do in Australia.
- Conflicts with local communities The project has been plagued by conflicts with landowners -local beneficiaries. Disbursing benefits from the project to local communities was designed in the project during a meeting in Kokomo in 2009. The agreement was signed between the government and representatives of local and provincial government as well as with representatives of landowners. The dispute was thus with the government and not the companies. Loi Bakanı the Governor of the Central Bank declared in 2015 that the funds due to landowners were held in a trust account when these were not paid once the project started in 2014. They were thus held in reserve,)This did not assuage protests in 2016, 2017 and 2018. The management of Oil Search declared at a shareholders meeting that the partners in LNG-PNG paid their dues to the government but that the problem was in the distribution of the money. A few days later, Oil Search claimed that journalists misinterpreted a message where its intent was not to blame the government. The problem was in so called “clan vetting. Incorporated landowner groups had to be formed through this process but it appeared difficult to identify ownership when oral testimony is the only source available to identify descent and territory. It is not surprising that money was first released by 2018 to downstream landowners. This concerned visual assists along the pipeline and in Boera village near the loading bay. The most severe conflicts were in the upstream areas when resources underground and thus not easily identifiable had to be compensated. Threats by landowners threatened to shut down the project never materialised but there was serious vandalism in Angore, Hela province. The most serious clash took place in Angore in 2017 and involved destruction of property. In 2018, protesting landowners destroyed property again and demanded a payment of US$10million as a fee for maintaining security at the plant. This introduced a new element, Payments for that purpose were not foreseen in stakeholders agreements. The company had to suspend construction there. Peace was concluded however in August 2019 and in 2020 payments flowed. Delayed construction was restarted. The conclusion of these conflicts gives some insight in the mechanisms of landowner compensation: the formation of landowning companies was completed, despite these problems. A director had been appointed to each company and a bank account was opened in his name under tutelage of the Mineral Resources Development Company (MRDC). Total payout to local beneficiaries was Kina 3.76 million for the period 2014-2018, This is to be distributed as follows: 40% to landowner groups, 30% to a Community Infrastructure Trust Fund (CITF) and 30% to a Future Trust. The landowner group is paid out of the allocated funds for equity. This shareholding gives dividends. Besides that, royalties are paid as compensation for exhausting the resource. There is a dearth of information on the extent to which this process of clan vetting has been completed. The issues surrounding payments to landowners remains a policy problem. Peter O’Neill blamed the governments preceding his Cabinet for the problems. There are calls for revisions to the Oil and Gas Act 2018 to resolve the problem as well as calls for revisions to the entire process of compensation to local communities. A new type of conflict emerged between pipeline and plant site landowners and those of upstream landowners. The latter objected to royalties being paid to the former as royalties are meant to compensate for the loss of resources and not merely the use of land.
- Government income from the project is unsatisfactory. There is in this question, however, not a straightforward set of figures indicating categories and periods on the contribution of the PNG/LNG project to government finance. For example, government mentions a category income from dividend and a category of income from return on capital, One could consider this as one post. Similarly there is a post debt servicing and Oil Search collar related costs. Unless it is clear which debt is serviced and how this relates for example to the Oil Search collar, the meaning of this information is not clear. ExxonMobil presents unambiguous figures. They claim to have paid 5 billion kina (US$1.4 billion) in royalties, development levies, taxes, and dividends to the PNG government over the period 2014-2018. This had grown to PGK 14 billion (about US$4 billion) in the period 2014-second quarter 2022. Exxon Mobil predicts that after 2025-2027 the amounts paid will significantly increase. The project is primarily financed by loans, which would eventually be paid off; Income from corporation tax and income from equity would rise as a result. Charles Abel in his capacity of Treasurer said in 2021 that he expected the loans to be repaid in 2024 and this would lead to a doubling of government income. He deplored however that payments would flow through state corporations, notably Kumul Petroleum Holdings (KPH). In such corporations the income is filtered by the management before it is passed on to government. The chairman of KPH mentioned in defence that KPH passed 78% of its income on to government. He mentioned as well that Kumul Petroleum's remittances represented over three times the total tax paid by PNG LNG Project to Internal Revenue Commission over the same period (2014 – 2018). This vindicated in his view the value of government equity in such projects.However LNG PNG was lightly taxed and that needs also to be taken into consideration. Nevertheless, there is strong agreement that the PNG government has been outdone in negotiations with the companies, which inspired an important debate among politicians about the mining and taxation legislation. Charles Abel recommended on the basis of past experience: "We need to develop a mineral and petroleum regime where we take a smaller equity for free and a higher royalty rate, introduce domestic market obligation and local content. We need to understand why a large current account surplus (from mineral and petroleum exports) still leaves us with a foreign exchange shortage."

== PAPUA LNG: the second LNG company in PNG ==
When the proposals for an LNG facility in PNG were raised there were two factions in the cabinet: one headed by Prime Minister Michael Somare who advocated a partnership with InterOil to develop the Elk-Antelope gas field, and the other by his son Arthur Somare, who advocated a partnership with ExxonMobil/Oil Search to develop the Hides gas fields. Somare's son won, but once PNG/LNG became operational, attention went to Interoil's Elk-Antelope Gas Field. The fields are located in a marshy area in the eastern margin of the Papuan Basin to the west of Port Moresby (90 km from the Gulf of Papua coast). The size of the gas field is certified at about 6.5 trillion cubic feet, compared to the estimated 7.1 trillion cubic feet in Hides and associated fields. While planning and implementation of the LNG PNG project did not encounter problems, the Elk-Antelope gas field project was mired in political and technical controversies.

=== Competition for control over the Elk-Antelope gas fields ===
Two relatively small oil and gas companies were major players in the Elk-Antelope gas field: Interoil and Oil Search. Interoil was a minor company in the gas and oil industry that acquired exploration licenses for oil and gas in PNG in 2005. The driving force in Interoil was its founder: Phil E. Mulacek, who announced in 2007 the discovery of a large gas field on the edge of the Gulf of Papua in the south of the country. "The InterOil Corporation, made the kind of announcement investors crave: explorations near the refinery had uncorked a vast pool of natural gas potentially larger than the United States' total residential consumption of the fossil fuel in 2005. The size of the discovery was so large, Phil E. Mulacek, chairman and chief executive, informed an analyst, that simply controlling its output 'was sort of like trying to stop the Mississippi.'" An agreement was made between Interoil and the PNG government to proceed towards exploitation on one condition: Interoil had to partner with a company that had experience the development and management of a gas field. Shell and ExxonMobil were mentioned as possible partners when Interoil entered negotiations. The investment bank Merrill Lynch (now called Merrill (company) was also involved. However, at the end of 2012 Interoil did not manage to find a partner to reach a Final Investment Decision (FID) and were in danger of losing the licence. A proposal suggested that the PNG government would become a 50 percent shareholder instead of taking the proposed equity of 22.3 percent. It was denied because the government did not have the money and it would not solve the problem of expertise. The French multinational Total SE is a major company in the oil and gas industry and they filled the void by buying a 60 percent interest in the gasfield. Oil Search Company entered negotiations around the same time. It was already a stakeholder in the LNG PNG project and it extended its interests by buying into the Elk-Antelope gas fields, and they bought the Pac LNG group that had a 22.8% stake in the gasfields and paid about US$900 million for participation. The money was sourced from equity bought by the PNG government and financed from a loan from the Swiss bank UBS. Oil Search contested Total's participation before the London court of arbitration. Oil Search claimed to have priority rights (pre-emptive rights) in buying into Interoil because of its acquisition of Pac LNG. Total continued to be present in Papua-LNG but at a reduced rate of 40% instead of 60%. Interoil remained with an interest of about 40% in the Elk-Antelope gas field. Oil Search made a bid for Interoil's remaining shares in the gas field for US$3 billion. OilSearch had to concede to ExxonMobil: they offered US$2.2.billion for the remaining shares of Interoil in the gasfield. However, Mulacek had been replaced by Michael Hession as CEO in 2013. Nevertheless, Mulacek challenged the deal in courts and in the shareholders meeting, but was defeated in both instances.

The pattern of fierce competition and shifting alliances resulted in the following shareholding and proposed structure for the project: Total is the largest shareholder of the Elk-Antelope fields with a 31.1% interest. The partners are ExxonMobil (28.3%) and Oil Search (17.7%). The plan assumed that construction is 70% debt financed.

Oil Search had the management contract for the upstream facilities while ExxonMobil managed the gas liquefaction plant and loading bay. The latter facilities would be built at the same place near Port Moresby as installations serving LNG/PNG.

The agreement contained an obligation to provide gas for domestic use (a reserved 5%) so that PNG is 70 percent self-sufficient in electricity supply in 2030. The State and landowners are not obliged to pay for their equity (US$900 million) before revenues start coming in. Payment for the Interoil shares by ExxonMobil is partly deferred until the FID and first shipments are made. Interoil retains residual rights to income from the gasfield if it performs above certain expectations. Pac-LNG has retained residual rights to income if the output is beyond a certain expectation. Total deferred cash payments for equity to the date of the FID (US$230 million).

=== Reactions to the Elk-Antelope field agreement ===
The Memorandum of Understanding between the PNG government and the companies involved in the Elk-Antelope field was announced at the end of the Asia-Pacific Economic Cooperation (APEC) conference in 2018. Its intent was to support PNG's international status, and it was followed by an agreement in April 2019 to start the Front End Engineering Design process. The Final Investment Decision (FID) that makes construction possible is expected in 2020. Output is expected to flow in 2024.

In 2011 the FID was expected in the same year. In 2017 the first LNG exports were expected in either late 2020 or early 2021 The new dates are also speculative because the financial underpinning of the announced agreement is virtually absent. There is only a commitment of a small proportion of the necessary cash for construction. The cash paid for the gas field is for the shareholders of Interoil and is not working capital for Papua-LNG. Nothing has been built or constructed with that money: it is merely a sum paid in the expectation of predicted income, which contrasts with investing in a company that started from scratch. The project is expected to be financed from loans for 70%; where the loan capital would come from is undetermined.

The agreement was also politically controversial. Authoritative voices had argued that the mistakes of LNG PNG should have been avoided. O’Neill agreed, though he also said that there should be an "environment for our development partners to maximise returns on their investment". He was under pressure from a comment in the March Monetary Policy Statement from the Bank of Papua New Guinea, which urged the government to be less generous with tax concessions. The policies with respect of tax and natural resource projects had led to less availability of foreign exchange and had not strengthened tax revenues. In 2018, PNG had a strong positive balance on the current account, which should have led to an increase in foreign exchange that never happened. Deputy Prime Minister Charles Abel criticised the benefits of natural resource projects for PNG. Abel collaborated with Minister of Mining Fabian Pok on the government negotiating team for the Papua-LNG project. He was content about the agreement: "We made compromises, but he considered it a significant improvement over the PNG LNG project: this Agreement provides earlier, less risky flows to the State, reduces the States financing burden to buys its shares, and provides some gas for domestic use at a discounted and fixed price. There are strong provisions for third party access to infrastructure and national content."

However, the agreement was immediately controversial. Some of the initial criticism came from Hela province, the locus of LNG PNG where benefits should have appeared. Philip Undialu, Governor of Hela Province, submitted a long list of critical questions. Minister of Finance James Marape, who was from Hela, resigned. More MPs followed him and resigned from the governing party (PNC). Four out of five resigning MPs originated from resource-rich areas

=== The analysis of Mekere Morauta ===
Former prime minister late Sir Mekere Morauta criticised three areas in the agreement: first, the agreement was created without the necessary and required consultation. Landowner groups have not been properly identified in the PNG LNG project after ten years of operation. The government claimed that the money was reserved for when the process of identification is complete, without clarifying where the money was. It was seen as a cardinal mistake in the PNG LNG project that this identification was not completed before the start of the project. Therefore, landowner groups should have been identified before the APDL (Application for a Petroleum Development Licence) was submitted. Abel defended it as the agreement is provisional; there was no APDL at the time. None of the members of the SNT (State Negotiating Team) publicly broke ranks with government, but there were strong statements claiming that this team, as well as the Department of Petroleum, have been sidelined. Morauta distributed a letter from the Department of Energy to the Secretary of the Government, which demanded that a proper APDL be made with the necessary documentation about the field's size and its economic viability. Total should have provided ten documents that were absent or deficient, but they did not follow up on requests. The necessary information for decision making was not there and the required procedure was not followed.

Second, the tax arrangements are similar to the ones in LNG PNG. The State agreed with the ongoing operational and depreciation costs. Depreciation in the project was tied to the repayment of loans. Profitability was predicted to be low until the loans were repaid with interest. If the participating partners furnished the loan capital themselves they would have assured themselves of a steady income stream irrespective of profitability. The faster the depreciation the less profit would have been made. Tax on interest or dividends would not be withheld, which meant the companies could export their income to a destination where little or no tax was paid without any taxation by the PNG government. Two of the participating companies – Total and ExxonMobil – would also have a steady income stream from the management contract. The companies would also have been exempt from paying GST, import, duties, and taxes on project goods and consumables. The management of the project was virtually tax free which made the management contract more profitable. Morauta argues that nothing was learnt from the LNG PNG project and mentions two specific instances: first, there was no proper taxation for windfall profits and there was no mention of taxing the oil that came out of the well mixed with gas (condensate). The oil was sold to Oilsearch, which could have been seen as compensation for Oilsearch losing out on the management contract.

The third area of criticism concerned the domestic gas obligations of the project. The domestic provision of gas was an option to 5% of the output in the agreement. The agreement was also in contravention to the National Energy Policy which demanded that 15% of all gas output was available for domestic use. The agreement mentions the only provision of gas for electricity supply ignores possible wider industrial use. Gas would also have been expensive as it would be indexed from a high base to the world market price while it is domestically supplied.

=== Doubts over the field's value ===
At the time of the agreement's conclusion, doubts returned in regards to the field's value. Interoil had always presented the Elk-Antelope gas field as their own original find. That is not true; there is an earlier explorative team in the area that found gas, but doubted whether the field was exploitable. A whistleblower in the Department of Energy has brought this in the open again at the time of signing the agreement. According to the report, the field had five major problems: the gas was probably not as extensive as predicted, not easily extractable, high water content, low quality gas, required expensive treatment, and the field's geology is suspect.

=== Government's response ===
Fok, the Minister of Mining, replied to the Governor of Hela province, Philip Undialo, who had a concern about the gas agreement. He denied all accusations and considered them lies for political purposes. He stressed that none of the members of the State Negotiating Team had publicly spoken negatively about the agreement.

=== Effects of the change of government ===
The agreement on the Elk-Antelope gas field became the core of political controversies about PNG's policies with respect to natural resources. It led to Peter O'Neill's resignation. His successor, James Marape, announced changes in the management of PNG's natural resources in his maiden speech, though at the same time he was keen to reassure investors: "He did not intend to chase industry away, but asserting that reforms were needed to ensure benefits are spread more evenly." Oil Search's Peter Botten proclaimed immediately after Marape's appointment that it was likely that nothing would change and arrangements would remain the same when the third gas field Pn'yang came into production. Botten did not expect any significant new concessions on the deal. which led to a bristling reply from Marape, yet he remained vague as regards envisioned changes. Minister for Petroleum and Energy Kerenga Kua announced two months after the change of government that a revision of the "regulatory and commercial terms of the so called LNG agreement was ready for political approval". The companies involved were unsympathetic to proposed changes. Total declared that no change in the agreement would be entertained. Oil Search warned that revisions may push back the FID to 2021 and projects elsewhere in the world may take precedence over Papua-LNG. Three government-backed lenders – Japan Bank for International Cooperation (JBIC), the US Overseas Private Investment Corporation (OPIC) and Export Australia Finance otherwise named Export Finance and Insurance Corporation (EFIC) – announced an initial commitment to lend to Papua-LNG. Kua negotiated with Total in Singapore in August 2019 to receive better terms, which resulted in a number of non-binding statements of intent. His most important statement was that in the future, contracts would be made on the basis of a Production sharing agreement which would lead to early free cash flows in petroleum and mining contracts. Kua stated on return from Singapore that the Papua-LNG project would proceed as planned. In fact negotiations were broken off and preparation for the project was suspended.

=== Resumption of collaboration ===
The suspension lasted till May 2021. Collaboration was resumed after a delay of three years as the result of a meeting in Paris between the CEO of Total and Sam Basil, as deputy prime minister of PNG. They announced the remobilisation of the project teams and other required resources, At the meeting there was a reconfirmation of the Papua LNG Gas Agreement in 2019 which had been the contentious issue in the fall of the O’Neill/Abel government. The signing of a Fiscal Stability Agreement in February may in this respect be more important as this concerns the most crucial issue: government income from the project. Government has given in more through withdrawing the amendments 2020 to the Mining Act. These amendments gave among others greater powers to the minister in determining a PDL (Petroleum Development License) and abolished the option of arbitration in case of a conflict. The minister stressed in parliament that these withdrawals were only applicable to Papua/LNG. A Petroleum Retention License extension was also awarded in February 2021. Such a license allows for project financing activities and also strategic market studies, which will be done separately by the participating companies or with other participants. The work programme for the Extension includes technical activities in preparation for the front-end engineering and design work. A pre-Front End Engineering Design (FEED) program does not guarantee a permission for a FEED. The aim remains to announce a FEED in 2022 and a Final Investment Decision (FID) in 2023. Production is expected in 2027. The agreements reached have a peculiar mixture of being definite and being provisional. This was made evident by Petroleum Minister Kerenge Kua when he stressed that the issues involved remained political at a meeting with a senior visitor from Total in France.

== The Pn'yang gas field ==
The Pn’yang gas field is the third project for PNG Gas. It is situated in the lowlands to the northwest of the Hides gas field. It was originally thought to be a relatively small gas field, but a certification exercise revised this as composing of 4.37 trillion cubic feet of gas. For comparison, Hides is estimated to be at 7.1 trillion cubic feet and Elk-Antelope at 6.43 trillion cubic feet. The development of this gas field would require relatively fewer expenses: the pipeline from Hides to the coast would only need to be extended inland. At the Caution Bay loading point it would need one extra train to condense the gas for shipping, which would mean building one extra train besides the two extra trains for the Elk-Antelope gas field. Synergies are expected.

ExxonMobil has been the main actor in this field and as lead operator owns 49% That is including its subsidiary Ampolex. Oil Search was originally a partner in the project before it was bought by Santos. Santos has after absorbing Oil Search 28% interest. JX Nippon operates through Merlin Petroleum company, its subsidiary, has a12.5% interest respectively. Exxon Mobil will work with the PNG government regarding their interest in additional equity in the project.

Negotiations with the government broke down in 2019, but were resumed in 2021 Agreement was reached in February 2022: three years after breaking off negotiations. The PNG government considered the deal reached very favourably. Prime Minister Marape claimed a government take of 63% in this deal as compared to 49% in the PNG/LNG project and 51% in the Papua LNG project. The agreement gives 34.5 per cent of the equity in the project to the PNG State, significantly more than the 22.5 per cent for the TotalEnergies-led Papua LNG project or the 19.6 per cent for PNG's first gas project, PNG LNG. Exxon said it will work with the PNG government regarding their interest in additional equity in the project. It will offload shares to provide for landowner interests, Construction is expected to begin when the construction of Papua LNG is completed in 2228 and production could then start in 2232. Exxon Mobil declared that the agreement sets a clear framework for development, but it is not a guarantee that the project will go ahead.

== The Western Gas Project ==
The Western Gas Project is the fourth LNG development. Central in this proposal are four drilled gas fields in the Western Province. Horizon oil is the major partner in these. Most of these interests have been bought from Repsol, a Spanish company. The Chinese company Balang also bought interests in the fields from Repsol. Repsol maintained interest in the field. after selling off shares. Kumul Petroleum holdings, the PNG state company is another partner. Brent Emmer, the chief executive officer of Horizon declared in 2017 that pre-Feed studies (concept engineering and design were ready. It entails the construction of a processing (conditioning) plant at the wellheads to separate the oil (condense) from the gas, a separate pipe line to Daru, and the construction of a liquefaction plant in Daru. There has been no significant follow up. It is a mooted point whether it should be a stand alone project or whether it should be integrated in the operations of LNG-PNG and Oil Search in the highlands. The expectation is that the project will generate also much condensate, oil that comes with the gas extraction. The project has been the subject of a conflict with the government because permits were cancelled. This was solved amidst allegations of corruption. An inquiry concluded that nothing inappropriate had happened and the PNG government did not follow up the accusations.

== The Pasca Gas field ==
Pasca gas field is the first offshore gas project in the Gulf of Papua New Guinea. It entails a production platform as well as loading capacities offshore. Twinza oil holds the licence. The field is known since 1988 but the technical capacity to develop the field is according to Twinza recent. A prospecting permit was issued in 2011.The company has been very optimistic about the stage of preparation: pre FEED work is completed in 2020. Negotiations with the PNG government for a Petroleum Development License (PDL) started in May 2020 and were concluded with a non binding agreement in September 2020. It was non binding because there was still fundamental disagreement on the government off take of the benefits. Negotiations were again protracted: an expected signing of a contract was cancelled in July 2021. Kua, the minister in charge then demanded a non disclosure agreement with Twinza oil. He also insisted that the top management of the company would be resident in Port Moresby instead of flying in from Australia. The deadline was set at 9 September 2021. Twinza oil was not willing to comply. The CEO of Twinza oil left his job because of frustration with government negotiations in October 2021. The proposed benefits for the PNG government vary between 50 and 60% and are multifarious including corporation tax, production retained for local consumption, development levy etc. There are no precise indications of the subject for further negotiations. The expectation was in July 2021 before negotiations broke down again to reach final investment decision in 2022 and first production in 2025. That is now certainly to be considerably delayed. Another contentious issue appeared at the Pandora Gasfield. Twinza oil wanted to align the Pasca Gas field with neighbouring Pandora Gasfield. However government retrieved the licence for the Pandora Garfield and gave it to the parastatal Kumul Petroleum Holdings.

== Equity participation finances ==
The projection of equity participation finances in LNG projects is a major issue in the politics surrounding LNG projects. The Mining Act in PNG allowed government participation to be involved to have a share of a maximum of 30 percent in natural resources projects; In the case of PNG LNG this was projected as a 19.4% share. About US$800 million was contributed to the construction of the project and the mining rights. This payment was to be made following the FID. A concurrent phase in the project was the front end engineering Design (FEED) which raised the project's cost, which required the share to be financed by equity. As a result, the PNG government had to find US$1 billion when the FID was made on 12 August 2008. In early March 2009 the PNG government acquired the sum through a loan from IPIC (International Public Investment Corporation; part of Mubadala Investment Company), a sovereign fund from the government of Abu Dhabi. It was not an ordinary loan, but an Exchangeable bonde. IPIC acquired the right to either be repaid in cash or through the security in the loan: PNG's equity in Oil Search Limited. These shares ideally would, at the time of redemption, equal at least the value of the loan which was designated at a share value of A$8.55. If the value of the shares was lower than the loan, the PNG government would have to pay out the missing cash. If the value of the shares was higher than the loan and IPIC wanted to buy the shares, the PNG government was entitled to the extra value in cash. The loan was expected to mature after five years, but IPIC could opt for a shorter period. The interest was 5%. When the loan matured in 2014 the share price was around A$8.55 and IPIC wanted the shares as repayment for the loan. The PNG government sent a delegation to Abu Dhabi in an attempt to dissuade them and accept cash. They refused and the Oil Search shares were transferred from the PNG government to IPIC. The share price also fell back and PNG had to add US$70.8 million. This financial construction was defended by Arthur Somare when the deal was concluded. He argued that the government did not want the loan to add to government indebtedness. It was fundamentally the sale of an asset – the Oil Search shares – in the first place. 2008 was also the year of the worldwide financial crisis which made it difficult to raise money. "The exchangeable bond effectively involved a future swap in shares held in Oil Search for immediate funding for a direct equity stake in the LNG venture." The latter was expected to be much more profitable: The government also expected to raise more money from the equity participation in LNG-PNG than from Oil Search dividends. It was expected that the revenue stream from the LNG project would redeem the loan. Arthur Somare was the government minister in charge of public companies (IPBC) and the LNG project. Morauta challenged Somare when the IPIC loan concluded; he criticised Arthur Somare's position as minister in charge of IPBC and the use of his position to monopolise negotiations about the loan. From the beginning, he criticised the mortgages of national assets (the government's shares in Oil Search). Morauta became the minister of IPBC in 2011 and reiterated his criticisms: "A loan in which Treasury was not involved; a loan which never had NEC approval; a loan which was never tabled in Parliament. It was negotiated and signed behind closed doors by people with no experience in the complex world of international high finance." He criticised technicalities of the loan: "The loan was drawn half a year before it was needed for financing and this led to a loss of interest. Currency risk was not hedged either. The most fundamental criticism was that A longer running time of the loan could have resulted in financing it from the income stream of PNG/LNG. That was due to early maturing of the loan not realistic."

The government of PNG lost its equity in Oil Search after the IPIC loan was redeemed and had exchanged it for equities in LNG PNG. O’Neill wanted to redress this situation with a new shareholder in Oil Search, who was looking for fresh capital to buy a stake in the next LNG project: the Elk-Antelope gas field. They needed US$900 million to buy the share of Pac LNG group in that field. Oil Search issued new share capital to finance this acquisition. These shares were bought by the government of PNG and financed with a loan from the Australian branch of the UBS bank. This loan was similar to the IPIC loan to finance shares in LNG PNG: the shares that PNG bought in Oil Search were security for the loan; it was a "collared loan", which implied hedging one's bets on the movement of share prices – the high and low were the collar – in order to guarantee a loan purchasing the shares. The risks for the bank were reduced because the loan was to be serviced directly from an Escrow account in Singapore where PNG's income from LNG PNG was paid. UBS had a first claim to the money,

The finances were controversial since its inception and were similar to the debate around the IPIC loan. First, the loan concluded by bypassing the legally required channels and the little consultation that took place was careless. For example, the board of the State Petroleum organization was presented with a decision that they were expected to follow and concerns were ignored. PNG's National Executive Council (NEC) was also confronted with a prepared statement. The treasurer, Don Polye, refused to sign and was fired as a result. However, there were more ministers who opposed the decision. The decision has probably passed in some form through the Central Bank and the Ministry of Finance, but prominent PNG economists argued from its inception that "the UBS loan was sought outside of sound fiscal management laws and legal governance". This was confirmed by an Ombudsman Commission report that recommended a leadership tribunal for Marape and O'Neill. The Commission found fifteen breaches of procedure. The most important breach may be that parliament was not asked to approve the loan as this was constitutionally required.

Much of the loan was shrouded in mystery and there suspicions about parties benefiting themselves. The suspicions were warranted as there was a bridging loan of A$335 million covering the costs of acquiring the shares besides the substantive collared loan of A$904 million to cover the price of the Oil Search shares. The Ombudsman Commission's report found that "it involved different contracts being signed between at least eight different parties including the PNG State, UBS AG, UBS Nominees Pty Ltd, UBS Securities Australia Limited, the National Petroleum Company of PNG (Kroton) Limited and its parent, the Independent Public Business Corporation, the Papua New Guinea Liquefied Natural Gas Global Company LDC and, finally, Oil Search Limited". The Commission of inquiry into the UBS loan would pay attention to the fees paid to brokers and negotiators.

Third, the loan was supposed to be redeemed for a long time before one could expect revenues from the Elk-Antelope gas field to repay it. It was expected to be serviced from the income from PNG LNG. However, according to the treasury secretary Diari Vele, the PNG government could only expect revenues to flow after 2020 when investment costs were recouped. The investment costs had to be settled out of depreciation charges to pay off the loans to the highly geared project. The loan had to be repaid in 2016 and Morauta wondered how that had to be repaid. Ultimately, the loan was repaid by the transfer of shares to Oil Search. The repayment was made at a loss: the government of PNG had bought these at A$8.20 and the price was A$6,70 at the time of redemption. When the deal concluded the PNG government expected the share price to double which would have resulted in a windfall for the PNG government. Kumul Petroleum Holdings, the state owned company that owned the shares estimated the loss at US$254 million.

== The policy debate ==
Income from natural resources in PNG projects were far below international standards, according to authoritative institutions (OECD, IMF and IETI Extractive Industries Transparency Initiative). It was thus understandable that renegotiation of the Papua/LNG agreement was a priority for the Marape government after coming to power. Kua reopened negotiations. However, the energy companies were only willing to grant minor concessions. Kua had to accept the terms of the Papua-LNG agreement, but he insisted that the agreement for the P’nyang gas field should offer considerably better terms: "In the P’nyang talks, the government appears to be seeking a better tax take, more local content and jobs opportunities, more project information from the operator, and a firm commitment to development of P’nyang in a defined timeframe." The energy companies were not willing to take that into consideration and talks broke down between government and the companies on 31 January 2020. Prime Minister Marape sounded confident that progress on the Papua LNG project with lead developer ExxonMobil would continue. Three new trains to convert natural gas into LNG were planned to treat the gas from Papua-LNG as well as from P’nyong. The energy companies wanted to only proceed with preliminary engineering and design for the expansion of its PNG LNG plan with new trains after a Petroleum Development Licence was given for the P’nyang field. The result was a stalemate.

Landowner interests are a further complicating factor. An umbrella organisation of landowners groups covering the area of operation of Papua/LNG went to the courts in order to ask for a temporary injunction against the continuation of developing Papua-LNG. The court allowed the landowners to delay the issue of a Production Development Licence until a new agreement was negotiated and a new Petroleum and Gas Act was in place. Among the landowners' demands were production sharing and at least 50% PNG ownership.

Policies did not reflect much on the attempts to gain equity in the projects. The PNG government has lost its shareholding in Oil Search and exchanged them in practice for a shareholding in LNG PNG. This exchange came at a substantial cost of contracting and servicing a loan and an additional payment. The government of PNG has not acquired a shareholding in Papua-LNG through Oil Search despite the cost of contracting and servicing a loan plus unknown extra payments. The energy companies benefited from a capital injection in PNG LNG through the government's shareholding. Oil Search has benefitted from a capital injection through the botched attempt to gain shares through the UBS loan. The agreement on Papua-LNG expected a shareholding of 22.25 percent in Papua LNG that is expected to be paid from the project's income. Ken Ail Kaepai of PNG University of Technology sketched the dilemma as follows: “Under this arrangement, the dividends will be delayed over more extended periods required for allowing the State to repay the equity capital sourced from external lending institutions or will enable the investor to recoup its equivalent equity capital cost internally using future positive cash flows from the project.” Kerenge Kua, the minister of mines gave the most comprehensive statement on mining policies so far to a webinar of the PNG Chamber of Mines. He advocated moving from a concessionary statement to a policy of production sharing. He deplored the borrowing for equity from the past, but did not come out against equity ownership of the government. On the contrary: the statement left the possibility of 100% state ownership open. The Chamber of Mines deplored the proposals. It also queried whether government debt was due to participation in mining. It seemed that government policy on natural resources was becoming less confrontational when Prime Minister Marape announced “a binding framework” agreement with Barrick Niugini gold mine in Porgera after a serious confrontation. This new deal includes 51% shareholding in the company. Charles Abel, entered the fray again. He was the deputy chairman on the government negotiating team on Papua/LNG and maintained that the deal struck by the O’Neill government with Papua LNG was wrongly portrayed It was much better than came across to the public. That deal also included 51% ownership of the project. However despite this mention Abel said: “The objective should be a more heavily weighted royalty system based on export value as it is much easier to monitor and is not subject to net profit as is dividends and tax. He reiterated in 2021: it is unwise for the PNG government to rely on equity participation but should instead mobilise an income stream through royalties and taxation. “As the major shareholder we will have to meet capital calls when required and bear operating risks like other shareholders. We don't need to do this”.

== See also ==
- List of LNG terminals
- List of natural gas pipelines
