= Komo, Papua New Guinea =

Komo
- Location within Papua New Guinea
- Coordinates: 06°03′55″S 142°51′09″E
- Country: Papua New Guinea
- Province: Hela Province
- District: Komo-Magarima District
- LLG: Komo Rural LLG
- Time zone: UTC+10 (AEST)

Komo is a town in Hela Province, Papua New Guinea. It has a 3200 m private airstrip, Komo Airfield (AYXM), which services ExxonMobil's Hides gas field.
