= Koroba =

Capital of Koroba-Kopiago District, Papua New Guinea

Koroba is the capital of the Koroba-Kopiago District of the Hela Province of Papua New Guinea.

== See also ==
- North Koroba Rural LLG
- South Koroba Rural LLG
