= Hulia Rural LLG =

Local-level government in Papua New Guinea

- Location within Papua New Guinea
- Coordinates: 5.945757°S 143.006102°E
- Country: Papua New Guinea
- Province: Hela Province
- District: Koroba-Kopiago
- Time zone: UTC+10 (AEST)

Hulia Rural LLG a local-level government (LLG) of Koroba-Kopiago District in Hela Province, Papua New Guinea.

== Wards ==
- 01. Alua/Kambi
- 02. Kela
- 03. Uruma
- 04. Piangwanda
- 05. Puju
- 06. Tigibi 1
- 07. Wabia 2
- 08. Wabia 1
- 09. Iangome
- 10. Damita 1
- 11. Hol'la
- 12. Dimu
- 13. Homa Pawa
- 14. Honaga
- 15. Lau'u
- 16. Pagale
- 17. Yabagaru
- 18. Davi Davi
- 19. Kuyali
- 20. Yarale
- 21. Hogombe
- 22. Tigibi 3
- 23. Dauli 1
- 24. Damita 2
- 25. Dauli 2
- 26. Dauli 3
- 27. Peri
- 28. Wabia 2
- 29. Wabia 3
- 30. Hubi Yabe
- 31. Takipupi
