= Lake Kopiago Rural LLG =

Local-level government in Papua New Guinea

- Location within Papua New Guinea
- Coordinates: 5.385683°S 142.495714°E
- Country: Papua New Guinea
- Province: Hela Province
- Time zone: UTC+10 (AEST)

Lake Kopiago Rural LLG a local-level government (LLG) of Koroba-Kopiago District in Hela Province, Papua New Guinea.

== Wards ==
- 01. Haredege
- 02. Arou
- 03. Hagini/Poko
- 04. Horale/Karuka
- 05. Aluni
- 06. Agali/Bulako
- 07. Hirane/Barae
- 08. Alukuni
- 09. Kopiago Station
- 10. Suwaka
- 11. Dolowa/Hukuni
- 12. Dilini
- 13. Peragola
- 14. Wagia
- 15. Usai/Malieli
- 16. Wiski
- 17. Wanakipi
- 18. Ambi
- 19. Yokona
