= Upper Wage Rural LLG =

Local-level government in Papua New Guinea

- Location within Papua New Guinea
- Coordinates: 5.979206°S 143.359024°E
- Country: Papua New Guinea
- Province: Hela Province
- Time zone: UTC+10 (AEST)

Upper Wage Rural LLG a local-level government (LLG) of Koroba-Kopiago District in Hela Province, Papua New Guinea.

== Wards ==
- 08. Homaria
- 09. Tuya
- 10. Mabia
- 11. Tengo
- 14. Tabala
- 15. Wambia
- 16. Ugu 1
- 17. Ugu 2
- 18. Yanagere
- 19. Yuhoma
- 20. Yongo
- 27. Ariaka
- 28. Panduaga 1
- 29. Panduaga 2/Piangai
- 30. Tawanda
- 31. Liuliu
- 32. Tundaka
- 33. Yongale
- 34. Margarima
- 35. Pipi
- 36. Kungu
