= Jimmy Nelson (photographer) =

British photographer (born 1967)

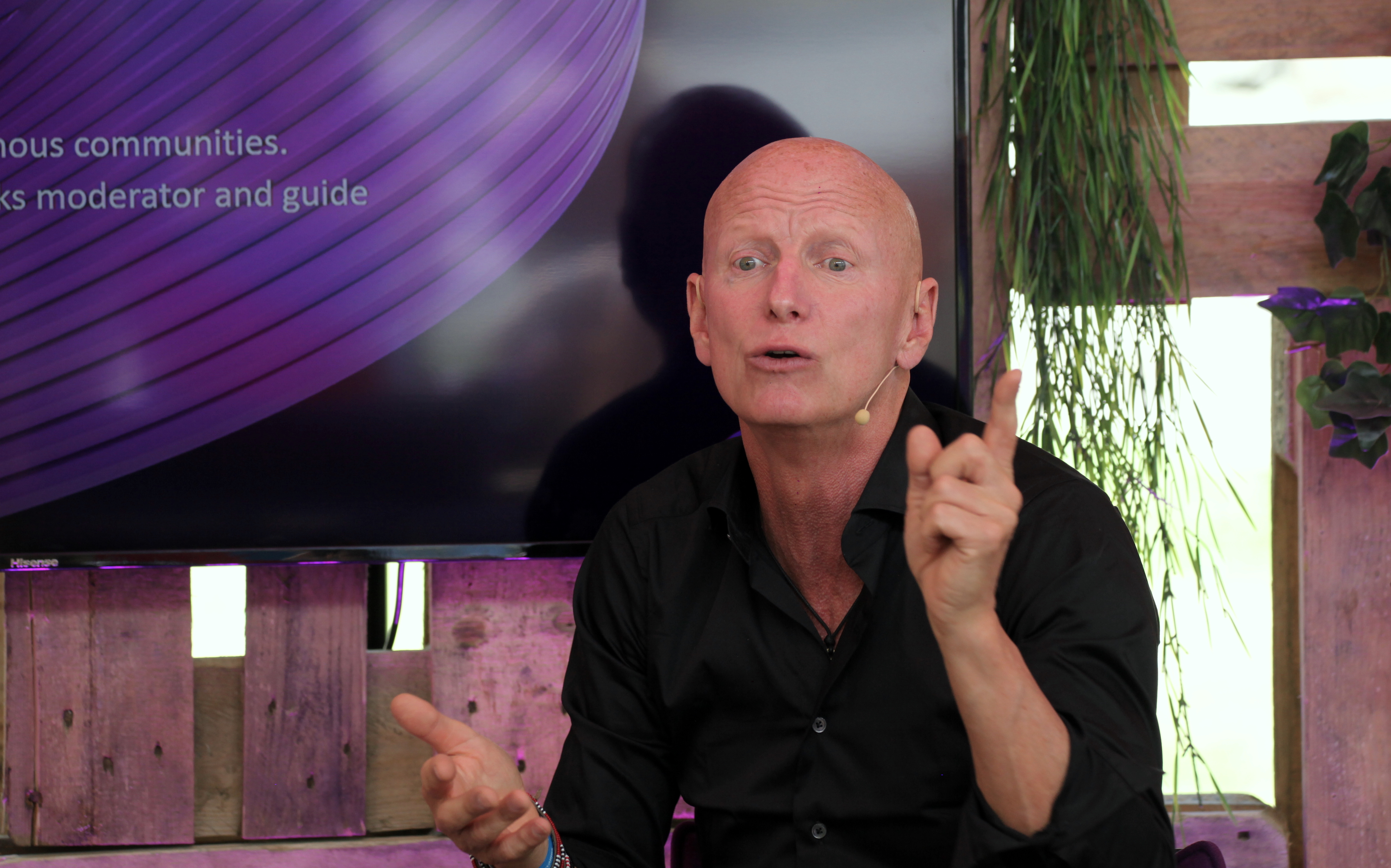
- Jimmy Nelson (2022)
- Born: James Philip Nelson; 1967 (age 58–59); Sevenoaks, Kent, England
- Citizenship: Dutch
- Occupation: Photographer

James Philip Nelson (born 1967) is an English photographer. He is known for his portraits of tribal and indigenous peoples.

== Background and early career ==
James Philip Nelson was born in 1967 in Sevenoaks, Kent. He spent his childhood in Africa, Asia and South America, traveling around with his father, who worked as a geologist for International Shell. At the age of 7, he was sent to Stonyhurst College, a Jesuit boarding school in Lancashire, UK. When he was 16, he developed Alopecia totalis, a condition in which all the hair falls out, which was caused by a culmination of stress and a reaction to malaria medication.

In 1985, at age 17, he left his boarding school and started to trek the length of Tibet on foot. He took a small camera on his trip and photographed his journey, which lasted about two years. Upon return, the collection of pictures he had taken in the formerly inaccessible country were published by the English National Geographic, to wide international acclaim.

Following this journey, Nelson embarked on more trips, documenting a variety of war zones, including Afghanistan, Kashmir, Yugoslavia, Somalia and El Salvador, and started to work as a professional photojournalist, until the age of 24.

In 1992 Nelson was commissioned by Shell Oil to produce the book "Literary Portraits of China". He travelled across the country for 30 months, together with his then wife, Ashkaine Hora Adema, who participated in the making of the book, and became the subsequent business partner of Nelson.

From 1997 and onwards, Nelson began working in the commercial advertising field. During this time, he continued collecting images of remote and isolated cultures.

== Photography ==
=== Before They Pass Away ===
In 2010, Nelson started to work on his second book, Before they Pass Away.

He travelled for 3 years and photographed more than 35 indigenous tribes around the world in Europe, Asia, Africa, South America, and the South Pacific, using a 50-year-old 4x5in camera.

Nelson said the project was "inspired by Edward S. Curtis and his great photographs of Native Americans". Like Curtis, Nelson documents his subjects in a romantic, stylised and posed manner, with the aim of "putting them on a pedestal". Nelson remarks that the project is not meant to convey "a documentary truth, but rather [his] own artistic interpretation and a celebration of diversity and beauty." The tribes that Nelson photographed include the Huli and Kalam tribes of New Guinea, the Tsaatan of Mongolia and the Mursi people of the Omo River valley in southern Ethiopia.

In a TED talk he described the working process used in this project and stated it occasionally took "months trying to find [these indigenous peoples] and then again weeks to gain their trust and permission to photograph [them]."

Nelson borrowed the funds for the project from a Dutch billionaire, Marcel Boekhoorn. As a result of the project, a book containing the photographs and texts, a limited edition of the book, as well as printed photo portraits were published.

=== Homage to Humanity ===
In September 2018 Nelson published his third book, Homage to Humanity. The book consist of over 400 photographs of 30 indigenous cultures, interviews with tribal members, infographics on the portrayed locations and cultures, as well as an application which incorporates 360° film material connected to the pictures, behind the scenes videos and background information regarding the travels.

For the creation of his last book, he travelled with an assistant, Stephanie van der Wiel, a fellow photographer whom he met at Leiden's National Museum of Ethnology, where he was presenting an exhibition of material from his first book.

Homage to Humanity is a continuation of Nelson's previous work, but purportedly sets itself apart in its more inclusive nature of its subjects. Through this approach, Nelson aspired to acknowledge the criticism his previous book, Before they Pass Away, generated controversy.

In the book's foreword, Mundiya Kepanga, Papuan chief from the Tari region in the Highlands of Papua New Guinea, writes, "My culture is who I am. It gives me my values and my sense of home, things I know I would lose if I had to adjust to the way of life that seems to be taking over our planet today. I believe that projects such as this book will help my generation and younger ones to sustain our unique and precious culture for the future."

== The Jimmy Nelson Foundation ==
The Jimmy Nelson Foundation is a nonprofit organisation founded in 2016 to stimulate cultural expression by facilitating projects that promote the heritage of indigenous cultures.

Nelson says, "The foundation has evolved into teaching indigenous peoples' pride. I'm creating many teams to go off around the world and do what I do. We're gathering [pictures, video and other information] and creating a digital fireplace, sort of like a library in the sky, of all this heritage for future generations."

The Foundation's most prominent project involved a collaboration with J. Walter Thompson India and J. Walter Thompson Amsterdam. The campaign opened with a short film, titled Blink. And they're gone., made using more than 1,500 photographs taken by Nelson during his travels. The film took 90 days to edit, and includes images of the Huli Wigmen from Papua New Guinea, the Kazakhs of Mongolia, the Sadhus of India, the Wodaabe from Chad and a number of other cultures. The film was directed by JWT India's chief creative officer, Senthil Kumar in Mumbai, working closely with J. Walter Thompson's global creative lead, Bas Korsten.

== Controversy ==
Nelson's work has been criticized for inaccuracies and generalizations. Julia Lagoutte writes in the OpenDemocracy: "It is simply not true that tribal people have been "unchanged for thousands of years"; they have been evolving constantly, as we have. It is clear that for Nelson, their attraction and purity is rooted in their exclusion from the future, and their containment to the past – so that is the only reality he presents in his photos. By omitting their interactions with the 'modern world' that they are a part of, and perpetuating the myth that they are dying out, Nelson's work freezes tribal peoples in the past and effectively denies them a place in this world." Nelson's project Before They Pass Away came under attack from Stephen Corry, director of Survival International, the global movement for tribal peoples' rights. Corry attacked Nelson's work for presenting a false and damaging picture of tribal peoples. Corry maintained that Nelson's pictures bore little relationship either to how the people look now, or to how they've ever appeared. Papuan tribal leader Benny Wenda has also criticized Nelson for describing his tribe as "headhunters", when in fact the Dani have never practised cannibalism. Nelson also received criticism from fellow photographers, such as Timothy Allen, a veteran photographer for the BBC's Human Planet. He states that, "the patronizing and self-aggrandizing narrative behind 'Before They Pass Away' is literally painful to watch."

Nelson defended his work against the criticism of Survival International in a BBC interview, explaining, "The pictures are definitely arranged. People don't naturally stand under a waterfall at 7 AM waiting for the sun to rise, unless you ask them to. I'm presenting these people in a way that hasn't been done before. We present ourselves in the developed world in a very idealised, stylised way because we believe we are important. I've given them the time, the respect that we would give ourselves..." "The title [Before They Pass Away] was melodramatic," Nelson said in an interview with WBUR. "A little naive. Everyone got upset saying, "Who's dying?" It was a little bit naive, but then it actually paid off because it caused a big discussion." Nelson denies exploiting any of the indigenous communities, and argues that only after gaining trust and understanding of their culture they grant him access. Nelson defended his book by saying that it was never meant to be reportage, but an "aesthetic, romantic, subjective, iconographic representation of people who are normally represented in a very patronising and demeaning way."

With his last project, Homage to Humanity, Nelson says he has listened to the criticism. 'Before They Pass Away' sparked what was sometimes quite a positive but otherwise heated conversation... In Homage to Humanity I wanted to give more of a voice to the subjects—their dreams and their opinions and their worldview."

== Personal life ==
Nelson was married to Ashkaine Hora Adema from 1994 to 2017. Nelson and Adema have three children together. Nelson is based in Amsterdam, where his company Jimmy Nelson Pictures B.V. is located.

== Publications ==
- Nelson, James Philip (1995). Literary Portraits of China. with contributions by Ashkaine Hora Adema, Nigel Cameron, How Man Wong. Odyssey. ISBN 9622174051 – via Google Books.
- Nelson, Jimmy (2009). Before They Pass Away. teNeues. ISBN 9783832733186 – via Google Books.
- Nelson, Jimmy (2018). Homage To Humanity. Donna Karan (Foreword), Mundiya Kepanga (Foreword). Rizzoli International Publications. ISBN 978-0847862146 – via Google Books.

== See also ==
- Edward S. Curtis, American photographer whose work focused on the American West and on Native American peoples
- Photography by indigenous peoples of the Americas
- Salvage ethnography
