= Alexander Khimushin =

Russian photographer

Alexander Khimushin is a Russian ethnographic photographer. He was born and raised in Yakutia, Siberia. He currently lives in North Queensland, Australia.

Khimushin has traveled to more than 90 countries where he has photographed indigenous people for his World in Faces project and other projects on vanishing cultures. His work has been compared to Steve McCurry and Jimmy Nelson. He was invited by the Office of the United Nations High Commissioner for Human Rights to exhibit his work in commemoration of the 70th anniversary of the 1948 Universal Declaration of Human Rights. Khimushin's visual anthropology investigates disappearing languages and cultures.
