= Tebi =

Tebi may refer to:

- Tebi language, of Papua New Guinea
- Tebi Rural LLG, Papua New Guinea
- Tebi-, a binary prefix

== See also ==
- Tebis (Technische Entwicklung Beratung und Individuelle Software), a CAD/CAM program
