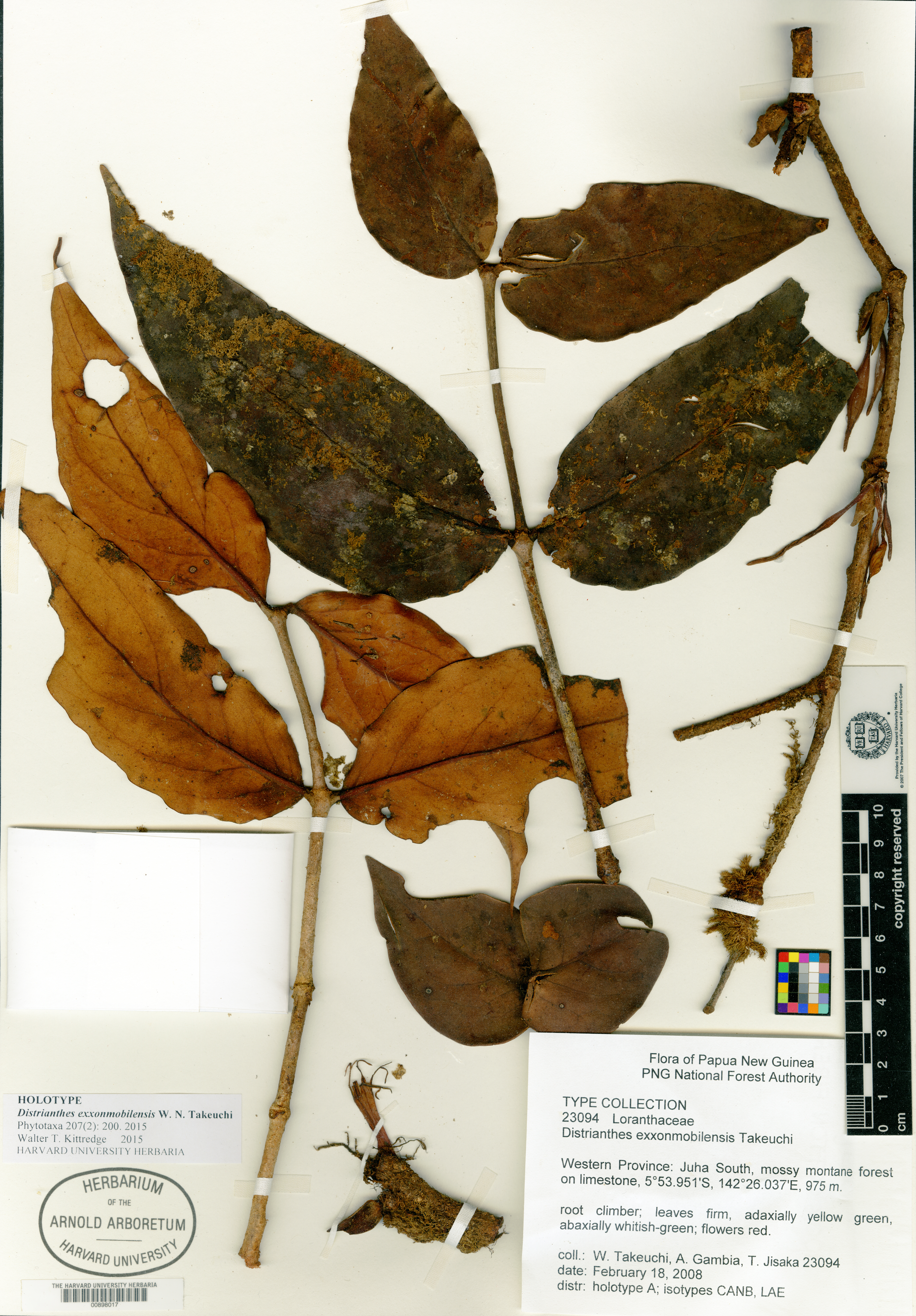

Scientific classification
- Kingdom: Plantae
- Clade: Tracheophytes
- Clade: Angiosperms
- Clade: Eudicots
- Order: Santalales
- Family: Loranthaceae
- Genus: Distrianthes
- Species: D. exxonmobilensis

Binomial name
- Distrianthes exxonmobilensis W.N.Takeuchi

= Distrianthes exxonmobilensis =

Species of plant

Distrianthes exxonmobilensis is a species of flowering plant in the showy mistletoe family Loranthaceae, native to Papua New Guinea. It is a shrub with firm leaves, and a reddish-brown corolla.

The species was described in 2015, and named after the company ExxonMobil.

== Taxonomy ==
Distrianthes exxonmobilensis was described in 2015. It was the second species of Distrianthes described.

== Distribution ==
Distrianthes exxonmobilensis is native to Papua New Guinea. The species is known only from its type locality, in the Western Province of Papua New Guinea. The species is found in mossy forests, on limestone karst, at elevations of 665–975 metres (2,200–3,200 ft).

== Description ==
Distrianthes exxonmobilensis is a shrub. The branchlets are compressed when young, and become cylindrical as they age.

The leaves are arranged oppositely, are lanceolate-ovate to elliptical, 6–12 centimetres (2.4–4.7 in) long, 3.4–6.6 centimetres (1.3–2.6 in) wide, and often curved. The leaves are firm, thick, and have undulating margins.

The inflorescences grow directly on the branches. The flowers are solitary, or in groups of three. The calyx is 2–3 millimetres (0.08–0.12 in) long, and 2.2–2.5 millimetres (0.09–0.10 in) wide. The calyx tube is obconical and has a translucent margin. The corolla has fused petals, and is reddish-brown in colour. The corolla tube can be straight or curved. The plants have been seen flowering in February.

== Etymology ==
The species is named after ExxonMobil, an oil and gas company. The author who described the species stated that "many biological discoveries were made during the PNG LNG Pipeline surveys of 2008." These surveys were sponsored by ExxonMobil and Oil Search.
