= Huli people =

Ethnic group

Huli Haroli
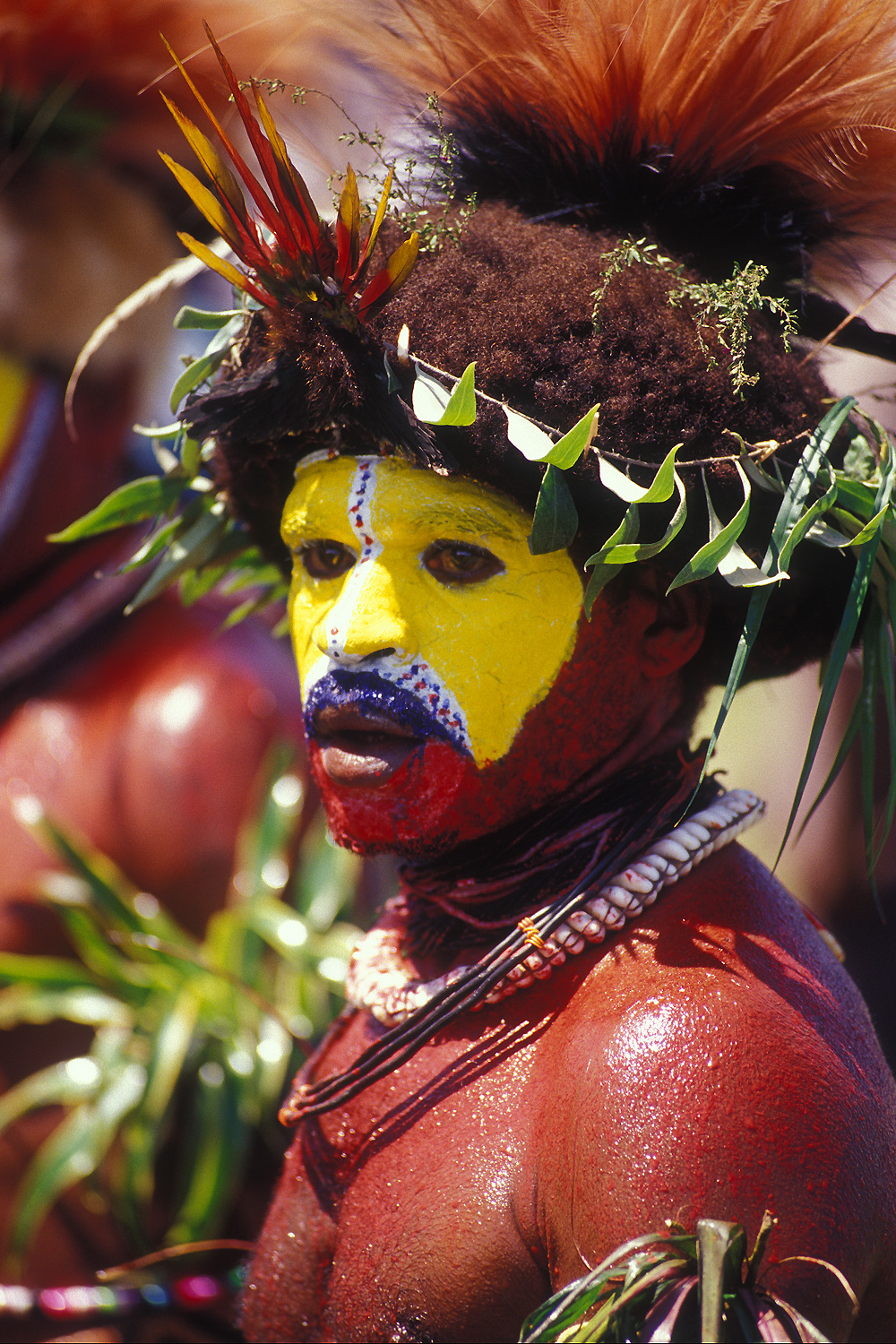
- Huli wigman, Papua New Guinea

Total population
- Over 250,000

Regions with significant populations
- Southern Highlands districts of Tari, Koroba, Margaraima and Komo, Papua New Guinea.

Languages
- Huli language, Tok Pisin, English

Religion
- Traditional beliefs, Christianity

Related ethnic groups
- Indigenous Papuan peoples of West Papua and Papua New Guinea, other

The Huli are an indigenous Melanesian ethnic group who reside in Hela Province of Papua New Guinea. They speak mainly Huli and Tok Pisin; many also speak some of the surrounding languages, and some also speak English. They are one of the largest cultural groups in Papua New Guinea, numbering over 250,000 people (based on the population of Hela of 249,449 at the time of the 2011 national census).

== Lifestyle ==
The Huli live in the Tagari River basin and on the slopes of the surrounding mountain ranges at an altitude of about 1,600 meters above sea level. The Huli live in a tropical climate where it rains seven out of ten days and where the temperature ranges from eighty degrees F. during the day to forty-five F. during the night. Occasional frosts do blanket the valley and sometimes destroy the people's mounded gardens.

The Huli landscape consists of patches of primary forests, reed-covered marshes, kunai grasslands, scrub brush, and mounded gardens traversed by rivers, small streams and man-made ditches which serve as drainage canals, boundary markers, walking paths, and defensive fortifications.

== History ==
The Huli are keenly aware of their history and folk-lore as evidenced in their knowledge of family genealogy and traditions. Unlike many other Highland peoples, they have not relinquished much of their cultural expressions to the new and innovative ways of the colonizers and outsiders who settled to live among them in 1951.

There is every indication the Huli have lived in their region for many thousands of years and recount lengthy oral histories relating to individuals and their clans. They were extensive travellers (predominantly for trade) in both the highlands and lowlands surrounding their homeland, particularly to the south. The Huli were not known to Europeans until November 1934, when at least fifty of them were killed by the Fox brothers, two adventurers unsuccessfully looking for gold who had just parted with the more famous explorers Mick and Dan Leahy.

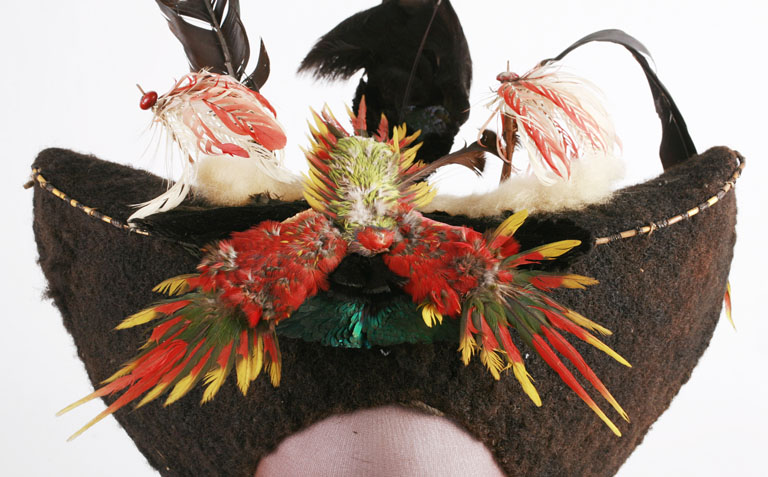
Huli men wear elaborate headdresses to battle; piece made c. 1918-1922. This piece is from the collection of The Children's Museum of Indianapolis.

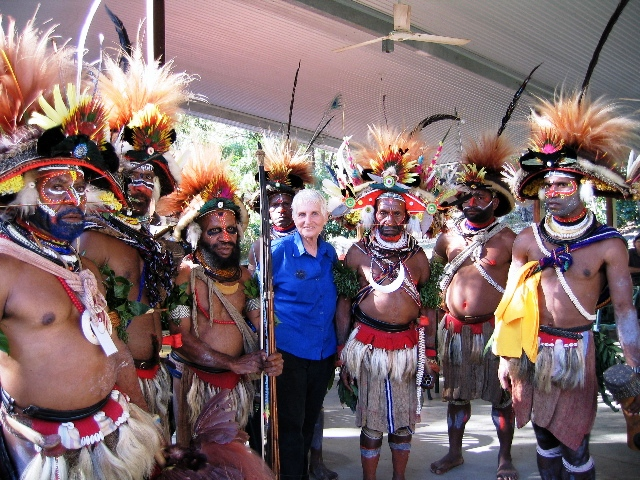
Huli Wigmen, Queensland Music Festival, Cooktown, Australia, 2005.

== Notable Huli ==
- Mundiya Kepanga
- James Marape
- Mashtag Brady

== Sources ==
- Lomas, G.C.J. (1998). "The Huli People of Papua New Guinea: A study in sociolinguistic change". Archived from the original on June 3, 2007.
- Allen, M.R. (1967) Male Cults and Secret Initiations in Melanesia. Cambridge University Press, New York.
- Frankel, S. (1980) "I am a Dying Man: Pathology of Pollution," Culture, Medicine and Psychiatry 4, pp. 95–117.
- Glasse, R. (1974) "Masks of Venery: Symbols of Sex Antagonism in the Papua New Guinea Highlands," Homme 14:2, pp. 79–86; 1968; The Huli of Papua, Mouton and Company, Paris.
- Hage, P. and F. Harary. (1981) "Pollution Beliefs in Highland New Guinea," Man 16, pp. 367–375.
- Lomas, G.C.J. (1998). Huli People of Papua New Guinea
- Meshanko, R. (1985) The Gospel Amongst the Huli, Master's Dissertation, Washington Theological Union, Washington, DC.
- Teske, G. (1978) "Christianizing the Sangai," Point 2, pp. 71–102.
- Sébastien Cazaudehore, La tourmente du Serpent, Editions Vega, 2021 ISBN 978-2381350097.
