= Mundiya Kepanga =

Papuan chief

Ukuma Mundiya Kepanga
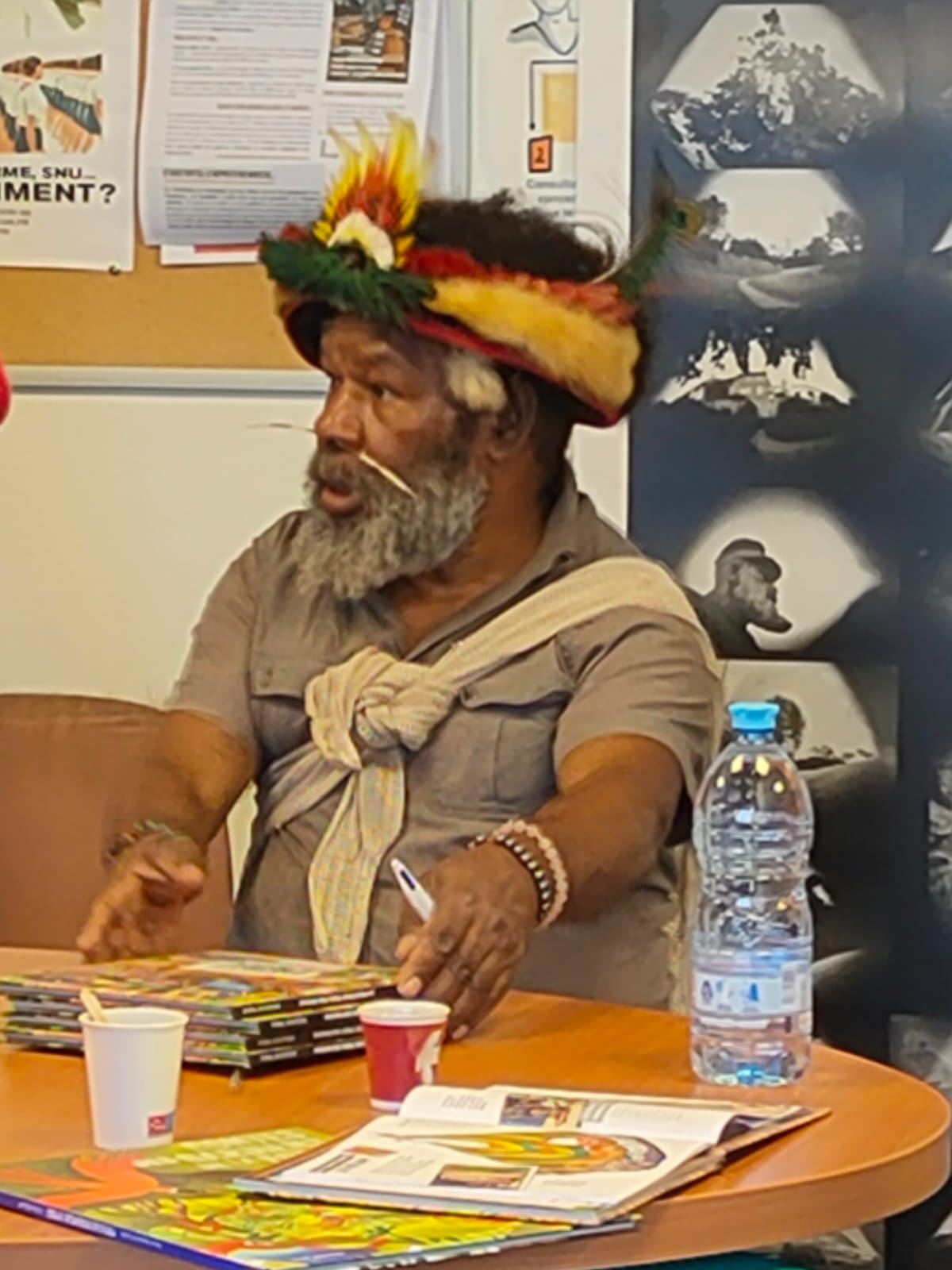
- Mundiya Kepanga in 2024.
- Born: Anda Mini, Hela Province, Papua New Guinea
- Citizenship: Papua New Guinean

Mundiya Kepanga is a Papuan chief from the Tari region in the Highlands of Papua New Guinea and a member of the Huli tribe.

During trips across Europe and North America, he has given lectures at schools and natural history museums. He has also organized assemblies focused on Indigenous people and he delivered the inaugural lecture of the University of Versailles for 2015/2016 in Forensic Anthropology and Osteoarchaeology.

Mundiya Kepanga has promoted intercultural dialogue and donated a complete set of his community's tribal costumes to the Museum of Natural History in Rouen, France. He has been involved in environmental preservation initiatives, including the establishment of a traditional bed and breakfast in his village.

Since 2000, several books and documentaries have been made on his perspective on the Western world, such as "Reversed Exploration", which was broadcast by Canal+ and National Geographic in more than 20 countries. He also co-authored several scientific articles, including in collaboration with Yves Coppens and Jean Malaurie.

Invited as a traditional chief to several meetings organized on the occasion of the COP21 Summit on climate change, he took part in the Indigenous People Facing Climate Change conference, organized at Musée de l'Homme in Paris, joining Nicolas Hulot, Gilles Boeuf, and Raoni Metuktire.

== Biography ==
Ukuma Mundiya Kepanga was born in the mid-1960s in the Highlands of Papua New Guinea, in a small hut built specifically for his birth at Anda Mini in the Telabo region. He belongs to the Telabo Angi Puria clan, part of the Huli tribe, whose members live mainly in the Tari region in the center of the Hela province.

He currently earns his living from farming sweet potatoes and pigs. As part of Huli tradition, he let his hair grow since he was a teenager to make a manda, a ritual wig worn during the ritual initiation ceremony. Since then, he has become adept at making and collecting adornments and feathers and joined his community's traditional dance group, Sing-Sing.

In September 2001, Mundiya met the French photographer and filmmaker Marc Dozier, a specialist on Papua New Guinea, and traveled with him as his guide for several weeks. This meeting is recounted in an article published in the French travel magazine Grands Reportages Dans la maison des hommes.

In 2003, Mundiya and his cousin Polobi Palia left their country for the first time, invited by Marc Dozier to discover France. This led to the publication of a book, Le long-long voyage, by Dakota Publishing.

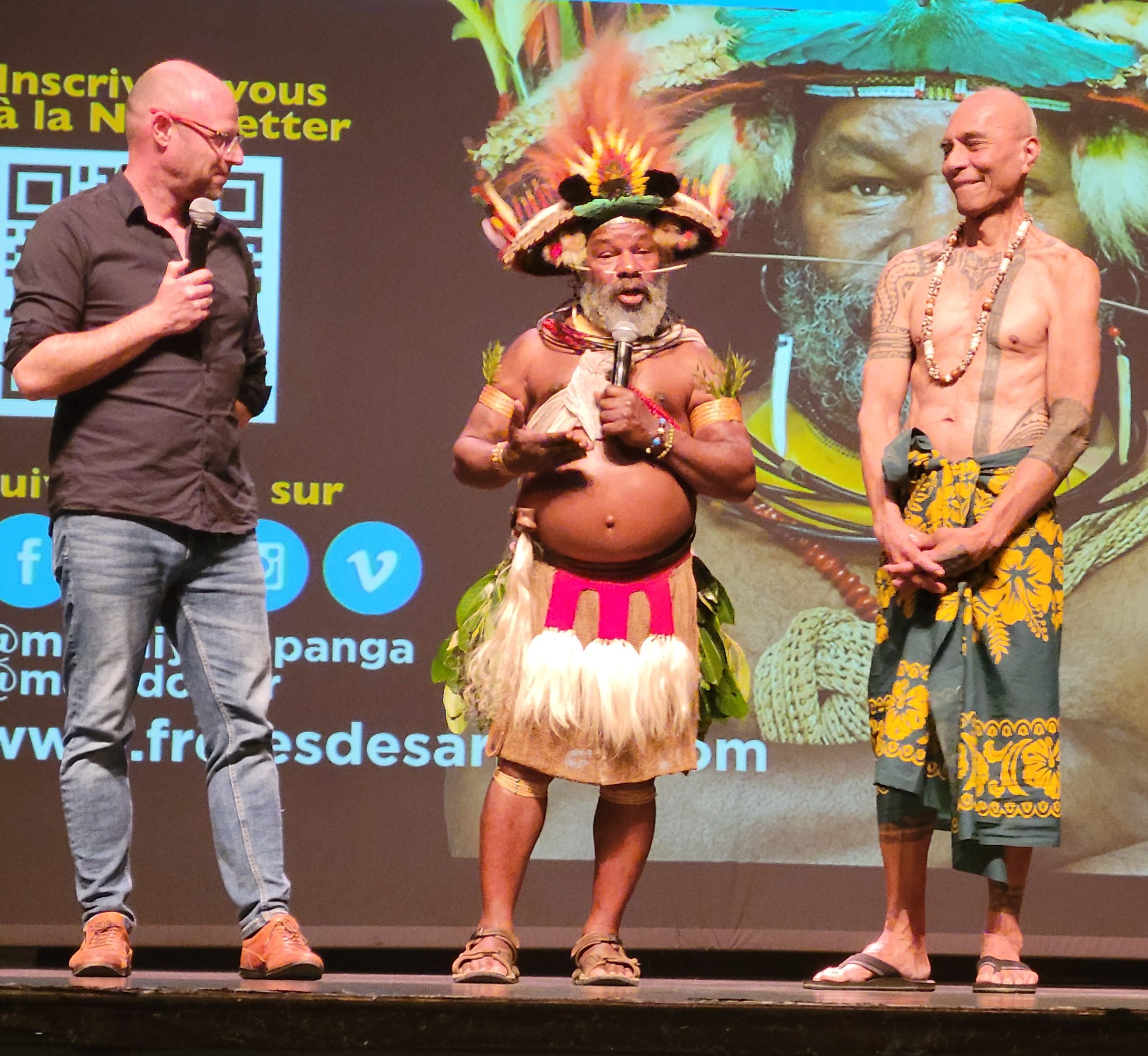
Chief Mundiya Kepanga with photojournalist Marc Dozier (left) and a spectator from Wallis and Futuna, during a screening of The Reversed Exploration, in Saint-Loubès (France), on April 28, 2026

In late 2006–early 2007, Mundiya and his cousin Polobi were invited a second time to France. This trip led to the making of a 100-minute documentary, titled "The Reversed Exploration" and produced by Jean-Marie Barrère and Marc Dozier of Bonne Pioche Production. The film shows Mundiya and Polobi travelling through France and making comments on the French way of life, in the style of the Persian Letters by Montesquieu. Broadcast for the first time on the French TV channel Canal+ on 8 January 2008, the film was later also broadcast by many other French and international TV channels like National Geographic.

In 2012, with his friend Marc Dozier acting as his translator, Mundiya published his autobiography, Au pays des hommes blancs, les mémoires d'un Papou en Occident (Niugini).

In 2012, when he heard that a Maori skull was being returned to the New Zealand indigenous community by Sebastian Minchin, director of the Natural History Museum in Rouen, France, Mundiya Kepanga decided to offer a full set of traditional Huli adornments to the same museum. The adornments, called Djeri in Huli, are on the third floor of the Natural History Museum in Rouen, in a display cabinet in the Australasia section.

In 2015, he was invited to participate in several conferences organized during the COP21 summit on climate change. He took part in the Indigenous People Facing Climate Change conference held at Musée de l'Homme in Paris.

== Filmography ==
- Frères des arbres, l'appel d'un chef papou (Mundiya Kepanga, the Voice of the Forest), Lato Sensu Productions, 85 minutes, a movie by Marc Dozier and Luc Marescot (2017).
- A Papuan in Binche, Niugini production, 7 minutes, a movie by Marc Dozier.
- Bluebell Girls Meet the Papuans, a One Planet production, 52 minutes, a movie by Jean-Marie Barrère and Marc Dozier.
- The reversed exploration, Bonne Pioche production, 104 minutes, a movie by Jean-Marie Barrère and Marc Dozier.

== Bibliography ==
- Contribution of indigenous peoples to the definition of health on the occasion of the COP 21, co-authored with Philippe Charlier, Yves Coppens, Jean Malaurie, Brun, Hoang-Opermann, Hassin, Hervé, and Paris, 2015.
- Autopsie de l'Art premier, preface by the book of paleopathologist Philippe Charlier, Rocher Publishing, Paris 2012.
- Le cabaret du bout du monde, le Lido chez les Papous, Niugini Publishing, 164 pages, 2013.
- Au pays des Hommes blancs, Niugini Publishing, 184 pages, 2012.
- La tribu des Français vue par des Papous, Dakota Publishing, 288 pages, 2009.
- L'Exploration inversée, Grands Reportages, 14 pages, 2008.
- Le long—long voyage, Dakota publishing, 200 pages, 2006.
- Dans la maison des hommes, magazine Grands Reportages, 14 pages, 2002.
