= South Koroba Rural LLG =

Local-level government in Papua New Guinea

- Location within Papua New Guinea
- Coordinates: 5.704375°S 142.736862°E
- Country: Papua New Guinea
- Province: Hela Province
- Time zone: UTC+10 (AEST)

South Koroba Rural LLG a local-level government (LLG) of Koroba-Kopiago District in Hela Province, Papua New Guinea.

== Wards ==
- 01. Magara 1
- 02. Erebo
- 03. Magara 1
- 04. Hedemari 1
- 05. Hedemari 2
- 06. Humburu 1
- 07. Humburu 2
- 08. Kakarane 1
- 09. Kakarane 2
- 10. Gunu 1 Council - (Mitago Atali)
- 11. Gunu 2 Council - (Kulupara)
- 12. Pandu - Council (Peter Wau Tapaya)
- 13. Maria
- 14. Andiriai 1 - Council ( Urulu Eka)
- 15. Koroba Station - Council (Andapa)
- 16. Andiriai 2 - Council (Ignatus Ingiti)
- 17. Kundugu
- 18. Tangimabul
- 19. Tumbite
- 20. Pabulumu 1
- 21. Egele 1
- 22. Egele 2
- 23. Mbuli

24. Teria 1 - Council (Kei Hinupi) 25. Teria 2--Council (Nele)
