= Tari Urban LLG =

Local-level government in Papua New Guinea

- Country: Papua New Guinea
- Province: Hela Province
- Time zone: UTC+10 (AEST)

Tari Urban LLG a local-level government (LLG) of Tari-Pori District in Hela Province, Papua New Guinea.

== Wards ==
- 01. Piribu
- 02. Paipali / Piribu 2
- 03. Kikita 1
- 04. Kikita 2
- 06. Kupari
- 07. Yulubate/Tari 1
- 08. Tari 2 / 3
- 09. Pai
- 80. Tari Urban (4)

== See also ==
- Tari, Papua New Guinea (town)
