= Distrianthes =

Scientific classification
- Kingdom: Plantae
- Clade: Tracheophytes
- Clade: Angiosperms
- Clade: Eudicots
- Order: Santalales
- Family: Loranthaceae
- Genus: Distrianthes; Danser

Genus of plants

Distrianthes is a genus of flowering plants belonging to the family Loranthaceae.

Its native range is New Guinea.

Species:

- Distrianthes exxonmobilensis W.N.Takeuchi
- Distrianthes molliflora (K.Krause) Danser
