= Tebi Rural LLG =

Local-level government in Papua New Guinea

- Country: Papua New Guinea
- Province: Hela Province
- Time zone: UTC+10 (AEST)

Tebi Rural LLG a local-level government (LLG) of Koroba-Kopiago District in Hela Province, Papua New Guinea.

== Wards ==
- 01. Tindiparu
- 02. Itapu
- 03. Hangapo 1
- 04. Hangapo 2
- 05. Andawale 1
- 06. Kela 1
- 07. Kela 2
- 08. Pai 2
- 09. Parinamu 1
- 10. Parinamu 2
- 11. Kuku 1
- 12. Kuku 2
- 13. Kuku 3
- 14. Hewate 1
- 15. Hewate 2
- 16. Kuandi 1
- 17. Kuandi 2
- 18. Pai 2
- 19. Andawale 2
