= North Koroba Rural LLG =

Local-level government in Papua New Guinea

- Country: Papua New Guinea
- Province: Hela Province
- Time zone: UTC+10 (AEST)

North Koroba Rural LLG a local-level government (LLG) of Koroba-Kopiago District in Hela Province, Papua New Guinea.

== Wards ==
- 01. Kelabo 1
- 02. Kelabo 2
- 03. Kudjebi
- 04. Hawinda
- 05. Aienda
- 06. Kagoma
- 07. Warukumu
- 08. Kenamo
- 09. Piangonga 2
- 10. Piangoga 1
- 11. Jakuabi
- 12. Levani
- 13. Betege 2
- 14. Ereiba 2
- 15. Ereiba 1
- 16. Kereneiba
- 17. Betege 1
- 18. Hujanoma 2
- 19. Hujanoma 1
- 20. Teria 2
- 21. Teria 1
- 22. Yatemali
- 23. Yaluba 1
- 24. Yaluba 2
- 25. Umimi
- 26. Topi
