= Komo Rural LLG =

Local-level government in Papua New Guinea

- Location within Papua New Guinea
- Coordinates: 6.063562°S 142.856625°E
- Country: Papua New Guinea
- Province: Hela Province
- Time zone: UTC+10 (AEST)

Komo Rural LLG a local-level government (LLG) of Koroba-Kopiago District in Hela Province, Papua New Guinea.

== Wards ==
- 01. Atare
- 02. Tumbite Ayagare
- 03. Egauwi
- 04. Eanda
- 05. Pami
- 06. Egaipa
- 08. Ayagate
- 09. Kulu Nogoli
- 10. Emberali
- 11. Padua
- 12. Kungu
- 13. Agu/Tani
- 14. Laiyako
- 15. Para
- 16. Laite
- 17. Mindirate
- 18. Pura
- 19. Turubi Tawanda
- 20. Tumbite Ligame
- 21. Yandare
- 22. Komo Rural Station
- 23. Gangulu
- 24. Mbeloba
- 25. Arali Kapale
- 26. Tagite
- 27. Kulu Pupa
