= Marcel Boekhoorn =

Dutch businessman

- Born: 30 October 1959 (age 66); Nijmegen, Netherlands
- Occupations: Investor and Entrepreneur
- Organization: Ramphastos Investments

Marcel Boekhoorn (Dutch pronunciation: [mɑrˌsɛl ˈbukɦoːr(ə)n]; born 30 October 1959) is a Dutch entrepreneur, investor, and owner of investment company Ramphastos Investments. Boekhoorn has a wide array of business interests in the Netherlands and beyond. With an estimated net worth of €1.9 billion (US$2.2 billion), Boekhoorn is one of the wealthiest individuals in the Netherlands.

Boekhoorn, a CPA by training, started his career as a chartered accountant (Register Accountant - RA) with accounting organization Deloitte & Touche in 1981. By 1991 he had become the organization's youngest partner to date. In 1994, Boekhoorn founded his investment vehicle Ramphastos Investments and started to invest in unconventional companies that had little traction with other investors (such as small wheelbarrow manufacturers and a spray can producer). The key approach of Boekhoorn's investment strategy is to place emphasis on adding value to the revenue side of the business equation, rather than exclusively focusing on cost reduction. This approach sets Ramphastos Investments apart from many companies in the private equity world.

Within a few years of its establishment, Boekhoorn had substantially grown Ramphastos Investments' portfolio and its invested capital by achieving large returns through several high-profile exits. Boekhoorn's major feat was the €300 million acquisition of Dutch mobile operator Telfort (co-owned by the railways) in 2005 and its subsequent sale nine months later to incumbent telco and Dutch market leader KPN at a valuation of €1.2 billion. Other examples of successful exits include: nl:Bakker Bart, (Dutch bakery chain, sold to de:Kamps AG), Cocachoc (sold to Suchard/Kraft Foods), Novaxess (a telecom provider, sold to Easynet Global Services), Motip Dupli (an automotive and DIY spray paint producer, sold to Intermediate Capital Group), Sim Industries (flight simulators, sold to Lockheed Martin), Suitsupply (men's fashion retailer, sold to the majority shareholder) and Delivery Hero (German food-delivery service, divested after IPO).

Boekhoorn became known to the wider public in 2018 when he acquired retail chain HEMA from Lion Capital LLP. HEMA had been struggling for years under an unsustainable debt burden resulting from the aggressive financing techniques under previous ownership. Boekhoorn, who made it clear from the outset that his top priority was to drastically cut HEMA's debts and the associated huge interest payments, was welcomed by the retail chain with open arms. He succeeded in resolving a long-running conflict with franchisees and forged important partnerships for HEMA, for example with supermarket chain Jumbo. When the situation at HEMA started deteriorating rapidly as a result of the coronavirus crisis Boekhoorn found himself on a collision course with a group of creditors. This resulted in him being forced to hand HEMA over to the Ad Hoc Group, a diffuse group of creditors including foreign investors such as Carval and Carlyle in mid-September 2020. In the end Boekhoorn, who had presented a proposal to HEMA and the Ad Hoc Group in mid-June to relinquish part of his shares and to invest additional funds in HEMA, did not oppose the loss of the retail chain. During the court case his lawyer said of this: "It is painful that the upshot could be that Boekhoorn will not be involved in this future for HEMA going forward, but now as before HEMA's interests are Boekhoorn's prime consideration." Marcel Boekhoorn invested a total of around €115 million in HEMA. The retail chain expressed its gratitude on its website and for example with a full-page advertisement in Dutch influential daily newspaper De Telegraaf and a video message from HEMA CEO Tjeerd Jegen. The new owners have let it be known that they wish to sell HEMA on again as soon as possible.

Wilco Jiskoot, former executive board member of ABN AMRO Bank, is one of the advisors of Marcel Boekhoorn.

In 2023 Marcel Boekhoorn announced he was stepping down as CEO of Ramphastos Investments. He appointed Jan Willem Neggers, who had been a partner at the investment firm since 2011, as his successor. Boekhoorn transferred responsibility for the company's day-to-day management to Neggers, but remained actively involved in Ramphastos Investments as its founder and major shareholder.

== Business interests ==
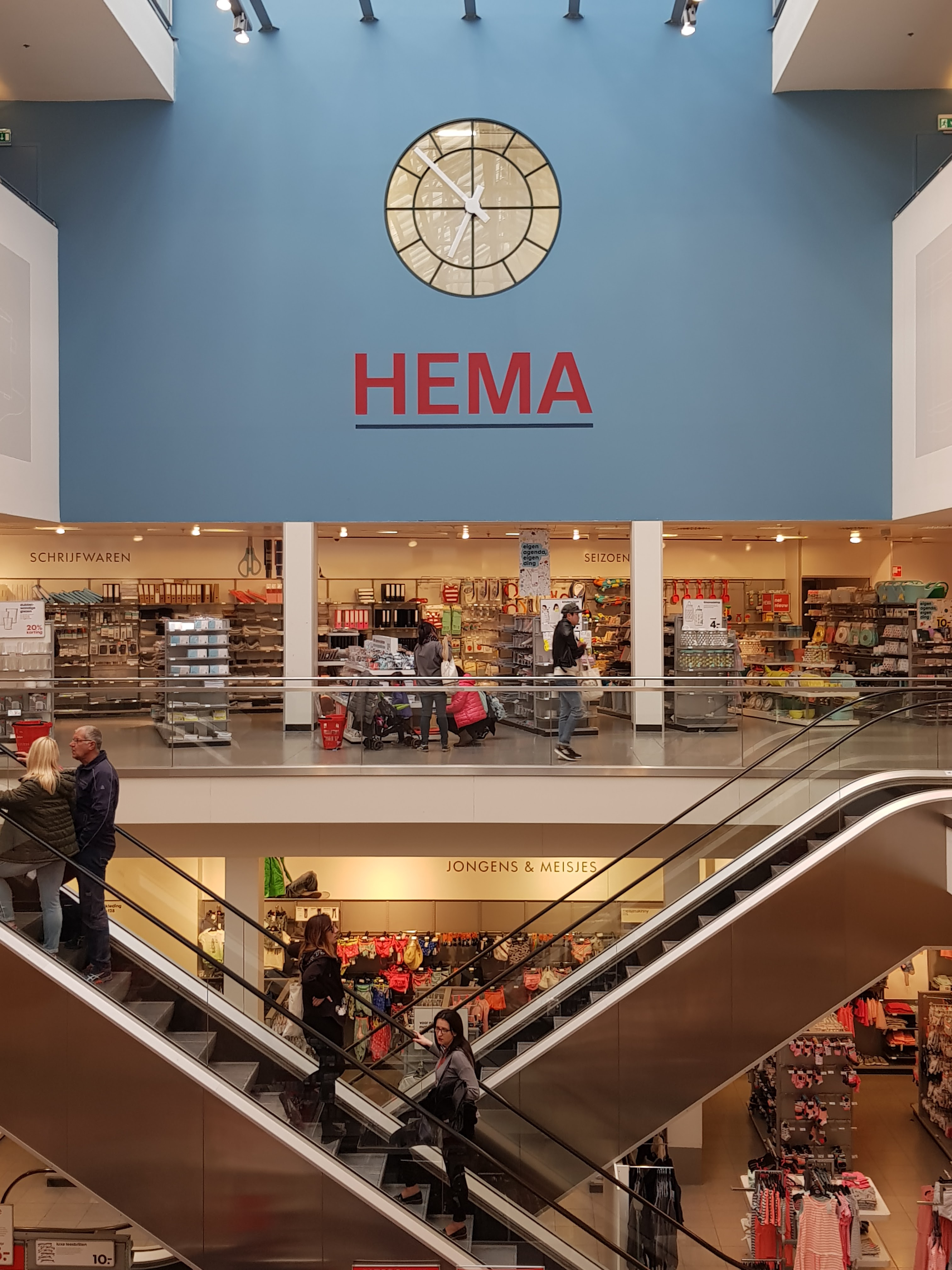
Inside HEMA on Nieuwendijk, Amsterdam, 2017

Privately, and through his investment vehicle of Ramphastos Investments, Boekhoorn holds interests in over 30 companies with a combined turnover of almost €5 billion, varying from financial and business services, retail, gaming, health care, new materials and advanced manufacturing. Former and current investments include:

- HEMA: a Dutch retail chain with over 750 stores distributed across 9 countries. HEMA was acquired from Lion Capital in 2018.
- High Tech Campus Eindhoven a high-tech centre and R&D ecosystem on the southern outskirts of Eindhoven. Boekhoorn bought the campus from Philips in 2012 for 425 million euros. He sold the High Tech Campus in 2021 for more dan 1 billion euros.
- Mazarine Energy^{[nl]}: oil and gas exploration.
- Innovations4Flooring^{[nl]}: patents and technologies for the flooring industry.
- Cyber1^{[nl]} (Nasdaq: CYB1.ST): cyber security.
- SecureTrading^{[nl]}: online payments.
- Vereenigde Havezathen^{[nl]}: uPVC and window frame production.
- Habanero: HTML5 slots and casino games.
- Ouwehands Dierenpark^{[nl]}: 22 hectare public zoo in Rhenen, Netherlands.
- Aviation Glass^{[nl]}: glass and mirrors for the aviation industry.
- The Antenna Company^{[nl]}: advanced antenna systems.
- Khondrion^{[nl]}: biotech research and pharmaceuticals company focussed on the treatment of mitochondrial diseases.
- Lumenvox^{[nl]}: speech software and multi-factor authentication solutions.
- VHZ Groep^{[nl]}, market leader in the Netherlands in the field of plastic frames and doors, in 2021 sold to Gilde Investments.
- FastID^{[nl]}, a Dutch start-up that allows people to create a secure, digital identity on their own mobile phone. Users can then travel with a face scan (i.e. without a ticket or admission ticket) or to an event.
- Charging station company Opcharge^{[nl]} (charging stations for electric cars).

== Philanthropy ==
Boekhoorn is privately a strong supporter of many nature and wildlife conservation and education programmes like SaveWave (protection of endangered sea animals) or the photographer Jimmy Nelson and his three-year trip around the world to photograph endangered tribes. Boekhoorn facilitated the adoption of two giant pandas from China by Ouwehands Zoo in 2017. In the presence of the Chinese President Xi Jinping, and King Willem Alexander, Boekhoorn signed a partnership agreement on behalf of Ouwehands Zoo with the Chinese Wildlife Conservation Association. As part of the agreement, Boekhoorn makes an annual contribution of $1 million to the preservation of the panda species and the conservation of its natural habitat in China. Boekhoorn supports the football club N.E.C. Nijmegen and invested in the racing career of his son-in-law Giedo van der Garde who raced in the 2013 Formula One Season for the Caterham F1 Team.

Boekhoorn was also executive producer of the successful Netflix series 'Human playground' based on a photo book by Flemish photographer Hannelore Vandenbussche. This series covers 24 sports in 25 countries, each time examining the origin and evolution of a particular sport. Movie star Idris Elba provided the voice-overs for the series.

== Private life ==
Boekhoorn has three daughters. His current girlfriend is Rebecca Cabau van Kasbergen, sister of Yolanthe Cabau, ex-wife of Dutch soccer player Wesley Sneijder. His daughter Denise Boekhoorn is married to ex-Formula 1 driver Giedo van der Garde. Marcel was also one of the personal sponsors of him in the lower classes to F1.

== Royal decoration: Knight of the Order of Orange-Nassau ==
On 26 April 2024, Marcel Boekhoorn was appointed a knight in the Order of Orange Nassau. Boekhoorn received this honour because of his involvement in various companies, organisations and foundations, through which he has made himself useful to Dutch society. Examples include Boekhoorn's support for Ouwehands Dierenpark and for football club N.E.C. He is known not only as a big supporter of the Nijmegen club, but also as a sponsor and advisor. In 2021, for example, he played an important role in restructuring the club's organisational structure.marcel-boekhoorn-benoemd-tot-ridder-in-de-orde-van-oranje-nassau
