= Liquid Niugini LNG =

Liquid Niugini LNG is a natural gas liquefaction project in Papua New Guinea. It is developed by Liquid Niugini Gas Ltd, and owned by PNG LNG Inc., a Bahamas-based parent holding company.

It is one of several natural gas projects in Papua New Guinea and is associated with the Hides gas field

== Technical description ==
The LNG plant will be built adjacent to the oil refinery owned by InterOil near Port Moresby. The LNG plant will consist of one processing train with nominal capacity of 5 million tonnes with option to add a second train to increase total capacity up to 9 million tonnes of LNG and 1 million tonnes of natural gas liquids per year. It will be supplied with natural gas from Elk and Antelope gas and condensate fields by 910 mm (36 in) natural gas pipeline. The preliminary engineering and evaluation design work were done in spring 2007. The plant will use ConocoPhillips' proprietary natural gas liquefaction technology (Optimized CascadeSM Process) and it is to be constructed by Bechtel.

The project is expected to cost US$5 billion to US$7 billion. The first cargo of LNG is planned to be delivered in 2012.

In December, 2009, Ex-Im Bank Directors approved US$3 billion in financing for the ExxonMobil-led project in December, 2009.

== Project company ==
PNG LNG Inc is owned equally by InterOil Corp., Merrill Lynch Commodities, Inc., and Pacific LNG Operations Ltd. There are provisions for the entry of strategic partners, and for inclusion of the Government of Papua New Guinea.

== Criticism ==
The project has reportedly sparked violence and in April, 2012, the Papua New Guinea government called in troops to quell opposition from villagers after a landslide linked to a quarry that had been used by the project killed an estimated 25 people.
