= InterOil =

InterOil Corporation
- Company type: Public (Acquisition by ExxonMobil pending)
- Traded as: (NYSE: IOC)
- Industry: Oil and gas
- Founded: 1997
- Headquarters: Port Moresby, Papua New Guinea; Singapore
- Area served: Papua New Guinea
- Key people: Michael Hession Chief Executive Officer; Don Spector Chief Financial Officer; Jon Ozturgut Chief Commercial Officer
- Number of employees: 2000 (2014)
- Website: www.interoil.com

Prior to its acquisition by Exxon, InterOil Corporation was an oil and gas company with a primary focus on Papua New Guinea. InterOil's assets included one of Asia's largest undeveloped gas fields, Elk-Antelope, in the Gulf Province. The company employed more than 2000 staff and contractors. Its main offices were in Singapore and Port Moresby. InterOil was formed in 1997 and was incorporated in Canada. The company was listed on the New York Stock Exchange and the Port Moresby Stock Exchange. It had a market capitalization of $2.8 billion.

It had the following assets:

− Exploration: Oil & Gas Exploration licenses to 3.9 million acres (an area larger than Qatar)

− Development: Elk-Antelope in Petroleum Retention License 15, being developed as PNG's second major LNG project with supermajor TotalEnergies and Oil Search

On February 17, InterOil announced its onshore Antelope-5 appraisal well had found a reservoir in Papua New Guinea's Gulf Province.

On July 21, 2016, ExxonMobil announced its intent to acquire InterOil for $2.5 billion. On February 22, 2017, InterOil confirmed the completion of this transaction.
