= Tari, Papua New Guinea =

Tari
- Location within Papua New Guinea
- Coordinates: 5°50′56″S 142°57′2″E
- Country: Papua New Guinea
- Province: Hela
- LLG: Tari Urban
- Elevation: 1,675.02 m (5,495.5 ft)

Population (2013)
  - Total: 15,413
  - Rank: 19th

Languages
  - Main languages: English, Tok Pisin, Huli
  - Traditional language: Huli
- Time zone: UTC+10 (AEST)
- Climate: Cfb

Tari is the capital of the Tari-Pori District and is the centre of Huli country in the Hela Province of Papua New Guinea. It is the second largest settlement in the province, and accessible by road from Mendi. The town is administered under Tari Urban LLG.

== Climate ==
Tari has a subtropical highland climate (Köppen Cfb) with heavy rainfall and mild to warm temperatures year-round.

Climate data for Tari
Month	Jan	Feb	Mar	Apr	May	Jun	Jul	Aug	Sep	Oct	Nov	Dec	Year
Mean daily maximum °C (°F)	24.1 (75.4)	24.1 (75.4)	24.1 (75.4)	24.2 (75.6)	24.2 (75.6)	23.3 (73.9)	22.6 (72.7)	22.8 (73.0)	23.2 (73.8)	24.0 (75.2)	24.3 (75.7)	24.2 (75.6)	23.8 (74.8)
Daily mean °C (°F)	18.6 (65.5)	18.8 (65.8)	18.8 (65.8)	18.8 (65.8)	18.9 (66.0)	17.9 (64.2)	17.6 (63.7)	17.6 (63.7)	17.8 (64.0)	18.1 (64.6)	18.3 (64.9)	18.6 (65.5)	18.3 (65.0)
Mean daily minimum °C (°F)	13.1 (55.6)	13.6 (56.5)	13.6 (56.5)	13.4 (56.1)	13.6 (56.5)	12.6 (54.7)	12.6 (54.7)	12.5 (54.5)	12.5 (54.5)	12.3 (54.1)	12.4 (54.3)	13.0 (55.4)	12.9 (55.3)
Average rainfall mm (inches)	228 (9.0)	251 (9.9)	267 (10.5)	258 (10.2)	224 (8.8)	163 (6.4)	174 (6.9)	190 (7.5)	219 (8.6)	250 (9.8)	220 (8.7)	249 (9.8)	2,693 (106.1)

== Aviation accidents ==
A Cessna 206 aircraft operated by Missionary Aviation Fellowship crashed close to Tari on March 23, 2006, killing its pilot and injuring 3 passengers. The pilot was a 42-year Swiss man who had been in PNG with the Swiss Mission for 12 years, and left a wife and four children behind. The pilot had reportedly entered the circuit area around Tari airfield and appeared to be flying well, but never made it to the runway. The three passengers were PNG nationals.

== Gallery ==
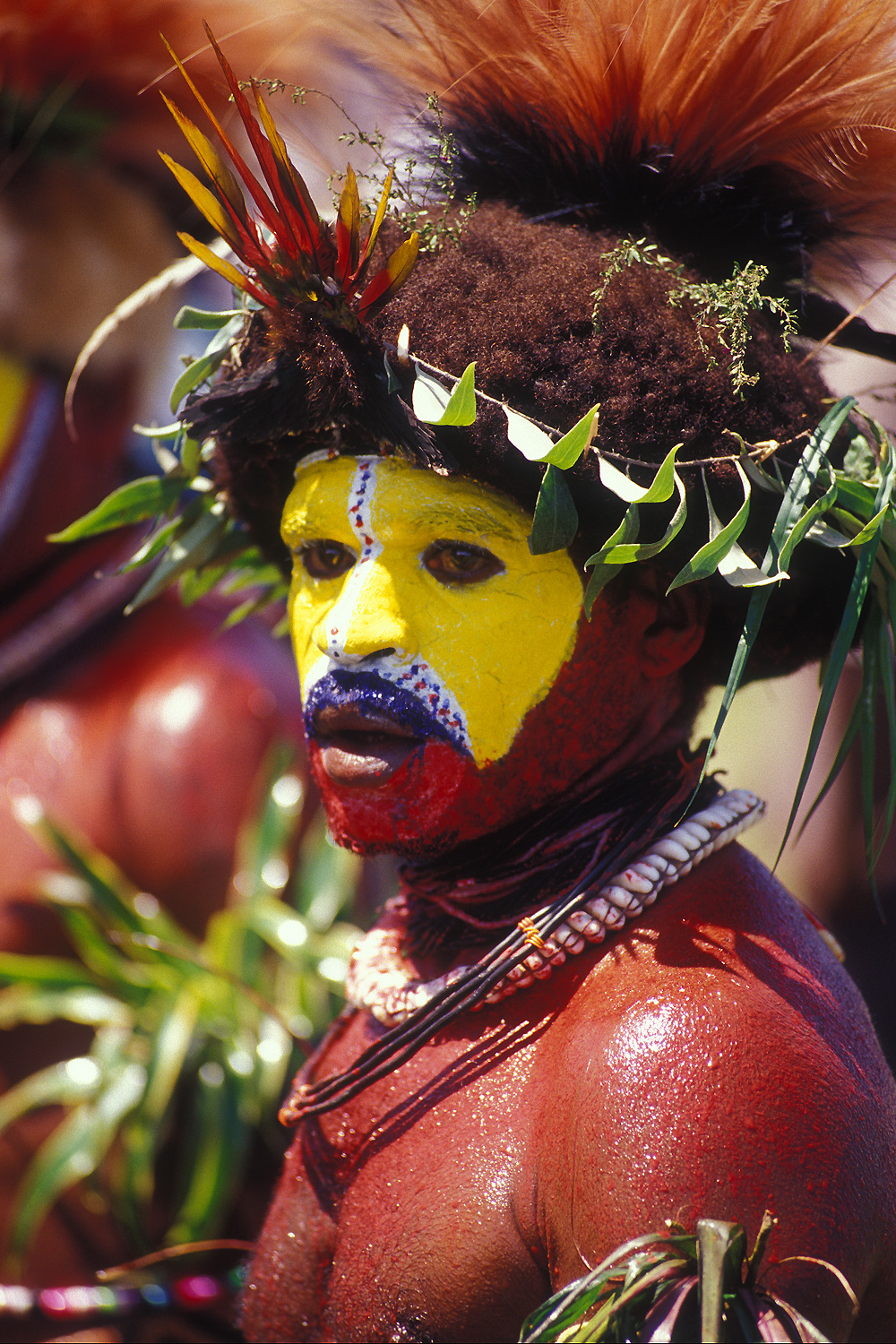
Huli Wigman from the Tari area. These Wigmen are known for their intricate wigs, which are made from human hair

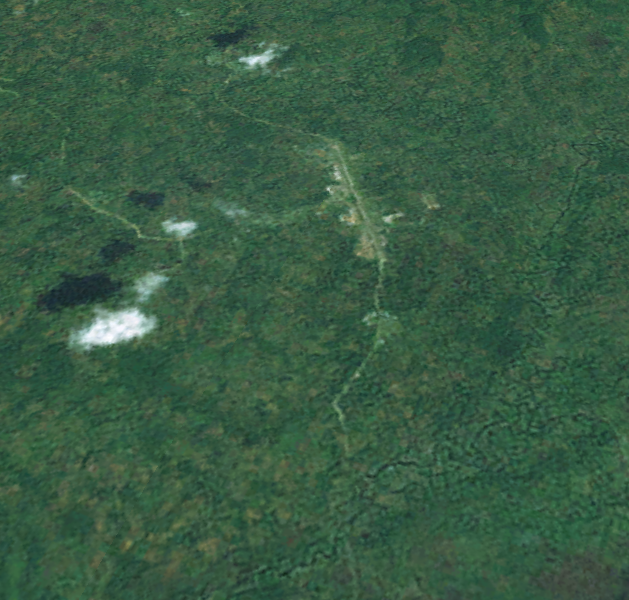
Tari NASA Landsat image
