= Hides gas field =

Natural gas field in Hela Province, Papua New Guinea

Hides
- Country: Papua New Guinea
- Region: Hela Province
- Offshore/onshore: onshore
- Coordinates: 06°00′18″S 142°48′36″E
- Operator: ExxonMobil

Field history
- Discovery: 1987
- Start of production: 1988

Production
- Current production of gas: 2.9×10^{6} m^{3}/d 100×10^{6} cu ft/d 1×10^{9} m^{3}/a (35×10^{9} cu ft/a)
- Estimated gas in place: 203×10^{9} m^{3} 7.1×10^{12} cu ft

The Hides gas field is a natural gas field located in the Hela Province of Papua New Guinea. It was discovered by BP in 1987, and after BP relinquished their interest, was later developed by ExxonMobil. It began production in 1988 and produces natural gas and condensates. The total proven reserves of the Hides gas field are around 7.1 trillion cubic feet (203 billion m³), and production is slated to be around 100 million cubic feet/day (2.9 million m³) in 2010.
