= Hela Province =

Province in Papua New Guinea

Hela Province Hela Provins (Tok Pisin) Huli Tindi
- Flag

- Hela Province in Papua New Guinea
- Coordinates: 6°17′S 142°50′E
- Country: Papua New Guinea
- Formation: 2012
- Capital: Tari
- Districts: List: Magarima District; Koroba-Kopiago District; Tari-Pori District; Hulia-Komo District

Government
  - Governor: Philip Aja Undialu

Area
  - Total: 10,498 km^{2} (4,053 sq mi)

Population (2011 census)
  - Total: 249,449
  - Density: 23.762/km^{2} (61.542/sq mi)
- Time zone: UTC+10 (AEST)
- HDI (2018): 0.450 low · 22nd of 22

Hela is a province of Papua New Guinea. The provincial capital is Tari. The province covers an area of 10,498 km^{2}, and there are 249,449 inhabitants (2011 census figures). Hela province officially came into being on 17 May 2012, comprising three districts previously part of Southern Highlands Province. It has oil and natural gas.

== Districts and LLGs ==
There were three districts in the province. However, one new electorate known as Komo Hulia LLG was approved in April 2022 and will go for first election on 28 April 2022 after splitting the Komo-Margarima Electorate. Each district has one or more Local Level Government (LLG) areas. For census purposes, the LLG areas are subdivided into wards and those into census units.

| District | District Capital | LLG Name |
|---|---|---|
| Magarima District | Magarima | Upper Wage Rural |
| Magarima District | Magarima | Lower Wage Rural |
| Magarima District | Magarima | Margarima Central Rural |
| Magarima District | Magarima | Beneria Rural |
| Hulia Komo District | Hulia Komo | Hulia Rural LLG |
| Hulia Komo District | Hulia Komo | Komo Rural LLG |
| Hulia Komo District | Hulia Komo | Mt. Sisa Rural LLG |
| Koroba-Kopiago District | Koroba | Awi-Pori Rural |
| Koroba-Kopiago District | Koroba | Lake Kopiago Rural |
| Koroba-Kopiago District | Koroba | North Koroba Rural |
| Koroba-Kopiago District | Koroba | South Koroba Rural |
| Tari-Pori District | Tari | Hayapuga Rural |
| Tari-Pori District | Tari | Tagali Rural |
| Tari-Pori District | Tari | Tari Urban |
| Tari-Pori District | Tari | Tebi Rural |

== Provincial leaders ==
=== Chairmen of the Hela Transitional Authority (2010–2012) ===
| Premier | Term |
|---|---|
| James Marape | 2010–2011 |
| Benjamin Mul | 2011–2012 |

=== Governors (2012–present) ===
| Governor | Term |
|---|---|
| Anderson Agiru | 2012–2015 |
| Francis Potape | 2015–2016 |
| Anderson Agiru | 2016 |
| Philip Undialu | 2016 |
| Francis Potape | 2016–2017 |
| Philip Undialu | 2017–present |

== Members of the National Parliament ==
The province and each district is represented by a Member of the National Parliament. There is one provincial electorate and each district is an open electorate.

| Electorate | Member |
|---|---|
| Hela Provincial | Philip Undialu |
| Komo Open | Daniel Tindipu |
| Koroba-Lake Kopiago Open | William Bando |
| Magarima Open | Manasseh Makiba |
| Tari Open | James Marape |
