= Koroba-Kopiago District =

- Location within Papua New Guinea
- Coordinates: 5°23′S 142°30′E
- Country: Papua New Guinea
- Province: Hela
- Capital: Koroba

Government
  - MP: Petrus Thomas

Area
  - Total: 5,272 km^{2} (2,036 sq mi)

Population (2011 census)
  - Total: 136,876
  - Density: 25.96/km^{2} (67.24/sq mi)
- Time zone: UTC+10 (AEST)
- Website: www.korobakopiago.com.pg

Koroba-Kopiago District is a district of the Hela Province of Papua New Guinea. Its capital is Koroba. The population was 136,876 at the 2011 census.
