= 1974 Birthday Honours =

UK national honours award 1974

The Queen's Birthday Honours 1974 were appointments in many of the Commonwealth realms of Queen Elizabeth II to various orders and honours to reward and highlight good works by citizens of those countries. They were published on 7 June 1974 for the United Kingdom, Australia (for Papua New Guinea), New Zealand, Mauritius, Fiji, the Bahamas, and Grenada.

At this time honours for Australians were still being awarded in the UK honours on the advice of the premiers of Australian states. The Australian honours system began with the 1975 Queen's Birthday Honours.

The recipients of honours are displayed here as they were styled before their new honour, and arranged by honour, with classes (Knight, Knight Grand Cross, etc.) and then divisions (Military, Civil, etc.) as appropriate.

== United Kingdom and Commonwealth ==
=== Life Peer ===
Baroness

- The Right Honourable Margaret Rosalind, Baroness Delacourt-Smith, Widow of the Right Honourable Lord Delacourt-Smith. Formerly Councillor of the Royal Borough of New Windsor and a Justice of the Peace.

Baron

- Sir William Picken Alexander, Secretary, Association of Education Committees.
- Alfred Walter Henry Allen, CBE, Chairman, Trades Union Congress.
- Professor Nicholas Kaldor, FBA, Professor of Economics, University of Cambridge. Formerly special adviser, now consultant on tax matters to the Chancellor of the Exchequer.
- Sir John Frederick Wolfenden, CBE, formerly Chairman, University Grants Committee, and Director, British Museum.

=== Privy Counsellor ===
- The Right Honourable Sir Robert Lynd Erskine Lowry, Lord Chief Justice of Northern Ireland.
- The Honourable Sir John Pennycuick, Vice-Chancellor of the Chancery Division of the High Court of Justice.

=== Knight Bachelor ===
- William Ferguson Anderson, OBE, David Cargill Professor of Geriatric Medicine, University of Glasgow.
- Lennox Randal Berkeley, CBE, Composer.
- William Peter Bulmer, Managing Director, Bulmer & Lumb (Holdings) Ltd. For services to Export.
- Eric John Callard, Chairman, Imperial Chemical Industries Ltd. For services to Export.
- Clement Clapton Chesterman, OBE. For services to medicine overseas.
- Professor Stanley George Clayton, President, Royal College of Obstetricians and Gynaecologists.
- John Rupert Colville, CB, CVO. For services to Churchill College.
- Bernard Delfont. For charitable services.
- Martin Llewellyn Edwards, DL, President, The Law Society.
- David Ernest Thomas Floyd Ewin, MVO, OBE, Registrar and Receiver of St. Paul's Cathedral.
- Derek Ezra, MBE, Chairman, National Coal Board.
- Eric Odin Faulkner, MBE, Chairman, Lloyds Bank Ltd.
- William Stevenson Gray, Lord Provost of Glasgow.
- John Capel Hanbury, CBE, Chairman, Central Health Services Council.
- Francis Alexander Lyle Harrison, MBE, QC, DL. For public services in Northern Ireland.
- Stanley Holmes, DL, Chief Executive, Merseyside County Council.
- Andrew Fielding Huxley, FRS, Royal Society Research Professor, University College, London.
- Emmanuel Kaye, CBE, Founder and Chairman, Lansing Bagnall Ltd. For services to Export.
- His Honour Judge Dermot St Oswald McKee, Circuit Judge.
- Edward Lancelot Mallalieu, QC. Lately First Deputy Chairman of Ways and Means. For services to Parliament.
- Arthur Gregory George Marshall, OBE, DL. Chairman and Managing Director, Marshall of Cambridge (Engineering) Ltd.
- Walter Edmund Parker, CBE Lately Senior Partner, Price Waterhouse & Company. For public services.
- Walter Laing Macdonald Perry, OBE, FRSE, CB, Vice-Chancellor, The Open University.
- Melvyn Wynne Rosser. Chairman of the Welsh Council.
- Arthur South. Member and Leader, Norwich City Council.
- Richard William Southern, FBA. For services to Mediaeval History.
- Patrick Muirhead Thomas, DSO, TD, Chairman, Scottish Transport Group.
- Brigadier Philip John Denton Toosey, CBE, DSO, TD, DL. For public services.
- Denys Haigh Wilkinson, FRS, Professor of Experimental Physics, University of Oxford.

Diplomatic Service and Overseas List

- Ira Marcus Simmons, ISO, MBE, Governor, St Lucia.

Australian States

State of New South Wales

- Hermann David Black, Chancellor of Sydney University.
- Frederick Walter Sutton, OBE. For services to philanthropy and the community.

State of Victoria

- John Thyne Reid, CMG, of Kew For services to the community and to the arts.
- Harold Frederick Stokes, CBE, of Toorak. For dedicated services to the Austin Hospital and other community activities.

State of Queensland

- Charles Newton Barton, OBE, ED, Co-ordinator-General.
- Andrew Bruce Small, MLA, of Surfers Paradise. For services to the welfare of the Gold Coast and the community generally.
- The Honourable Mr. Justice Charles Gray Wanstall, Senior Puisne Judge of the Supreme Court of Queensland.

State of Western Australia

- The Honourable Crawford David Nalder, of Applecross. For services to the State and in local government.

=== Order of the Bath ===
==== Knight Grand Cross of the Order of the Bath (GCB) ====
Civil Division

- Sir Antony Alexander Part, KCB, MBE, Permanent Secretary, Department of Industry.

==== Knight Commander of the Order of the Bath (KCB) ====
Military Division

- Vice Admiral Arthur Mackenzie Power, MBE.
- Lieutenant-General Patrick John Howard-Dobson, CB, (189025), late Royal Armoured Corps, Colonel The Queen's Own Hussars.
- Air Marshal Beresford Peter Torrington Horsley, CBE, MVO, AFC, Royal Air Force
- Air Marshal Douglas Charles Lowe, CB, DFC, AFC, Royal Air Force.

Civil Division

- Frank Cooper, CB, CMG, Permanent Secretary, Northern Ireland Office.
- Conrad Frederick Heron, CB, OBE, Permanent Secretary, Department of Employment.
- Derek Jack Mitchell, CB, CVO, Second Permanent Secretary, HM Treasury.
- John Martindale Wilson, CB, Second Permanent Under-Secretary of State, Ministry of Defence.

==== Companion of the Order of the Bath (CB) ====
Military Division

Royal Navy

- Rear Admiral Lionel Dorian Dymoke.
- Rear Admiral Hubert Walter Elphinstone Hollins.
- Rear Admiral Jack Rowbottom Llewellyn.
- Rear Admiral William David Stewart Scott.
- Rear Admiral Derek Garland Spickernell.

Army

- Major-General Ronald John Denys Eden Buckland, MBE, (165022), late Foot Guards.
- Major-General Glyn Charles Anglim Gilbert, MC, (108156), late Infantry.
- Major-General James Herbert Samuel Majury, MBE, (193883), late Infantry, now R.A.R.O, Colonel Commandant King's Division, Colonel The Royal Irish Rangers (27th (Inniskilling) 83rd and 87th).
- Major-General Charles Edward Page, MBE, (193565), late Royal Corps of Signals, now R.A.R.O., Colonel Commandant Royal Corps of Signals.
- Maior-General James Maxwell Sawers, MBE, (95201), late Royal Corps of Signals.

Royal Air Force

- Air Vice-Marshal Geoffrey Harold Ford.
- Air Vice-Marshal Philip Jacobus Lagesen, DFC, AFC.
- Air Vice-Marshal Ronald James Arthur Morris, QHS.
- Acting Air Vice-Marshal Howard George Cadwallader.
- Air Commandant Barbara Mary Ducat-Amos, RRC, QHNS, Princess Mary's Royal Air Force Nursing Service.

Civil Division

- Edward Armitage, Comptroller-General of Patents, Designs and Trade Marks, Department of Trade.
- Frederick Denys Beddard, Deputy Chief Medical Officer, Department of Health and Social Security.
- Keith Brading, MBE, Chief Registrar of Friendly Societies and Industrial Assurance Commissioner.
- Brian Crossland Cubbon, Deputy Secretary, Cabinet Office.
- Norman Dugdale, Permanent Secretary, Department of Health and Social Services, Northern Ireland.
- Hywel Eifion Evans, Under Secretary, Ministry of Agriculture, Fisheries and Food.
- Trevor Poulton Hughes, Deputy Secretary, Department of the Environment.
- Kenneth Ernest Lefever, Commissioner and Chief Inspector, Board of Customs and Excise.
- John Michael Moore, DSC, Deputy Secretary, Civil Service Department.
- William Henry Nichols, Secretary, Exchequer and Audit Department.
- Thomas George Odling, Clerk of Committees, House of Commons.
- George Paine, DFC, Director of the Office of Population Censuses and Surveys and Registrar General of England and Wales.
- Clifford James Pearce, Under Secretary, Department of the Environment.
- Charles Barry Shaw, QC, Director of Public Prosecutions for Northern Ireland.
- James Ian Smith, Secretary, Department of Agriculture and Fisheries for Scotland.
- David Richard Thompson, Registrar of Criminal Appeals and Master of the Crown Office.

=== Order of Saint Michael and Saint George ===
==== Knight Grand Cross of the Order of St Michael and St George (GCMG) ====
- Sir Patrick Francis Hancock, KCMG, HM Ambassador, Rome.
- Sir Edward Heywood Peck, KCMG, United Kingdom Permanent Representative on the North Atlantic Council.

==== Knight Commander of the Order of St Michael and St George (KCMG) ====
- Frederick John Llewellyn, Director-General, The British Council.

Diplomatic Service and Overseas List

- Edward Colin Viner Goad, lately Secretary-General, Inter-Governmental Maritime Consultative Organisation.
- Sir Edwin Hartley Cameron Leather, Governor and Commander-in-Chief, Bermuda.
- William Bernard John Ledwidge, CMG, HM Ambassador, Tel Aviv.
- Charles Martin Le Quesne, CMG, British High Commissioner, Lagos.
- John Oliver Wright, CMG, DSC, Deputy Under-Secretary of State, Foreign and Commonwealth Office.

==== Companion of the Order of St Michael and St George (CMG) ====
- Reginald Anderson, Assistant Under Secretary of State, Ministry of Defence.
- Denis Parsons Burkitt, FRS, Member, Medical Research Council External Scientific Staff.
- Professor Arthur Geoffrey Dickens, FBA, Foreign Secretary, British Academy. For services to Historical Research.
- George Wicks Marshall, MBE, BEM, Commercial Counsellor, HM Embassy, Copenhagen.
- William Nicoll, Minister, Office of the United Kingdom Permanent Representative to the European Communities.

Diplomatic Service and Overseas List

- Geoffrey Allan Crossley, HM Ambassador, Bogota.
- Christopher Ewart Diggines, British High Commissioner, Port of Spain.
- Albert Thomas Lamb, MBE, DFC, HM Ambassador-designate, Kuwait.
- Paul Henderson Scott, Senior Trade Commissioner and Head of Post, British Government Office, Montreal.
- Richard James Stratton, lately Political Adviser, Hong Kong.
- John Lang Taylor, lately Assistant Under-Secretary of State, Foreign and Commonwealth Office.
- John Alan Thompson, Counsellor, Foreign and Commonwealth Office.
- Willoughby Harry Thompson, CBE, Governor, Montserrat.
- Michael Scott Weir, Assistant Under-Secretary of State, Foreign and Commonwealth Office.

Australian States

State of New South Wales

- The Honourable Eric Archibald Willis, MLA, Minister for Education.
- Charles Edward Winston. For services to medicine.

State of Victoria

- Professor Howard Hadfield Eddey, Professor of Surgery, University of Melbourne.

State of Queensland

- Edmond Rowlands Behne, of Brisbane. For services to the sugar industry.

State of Western Australia

- Ralph Herbert Doig, CVO, JP, lately Chairman, Public Service Board.

=== Royal Victorian Order ===
==== Knight Commander of the Royal Victorian Order (KCVO) ====
- Lieutenant-Colonel John Mansel Miller, CVO, DSO, MC.
- Charles Lorz Strong, MVO.
- The Right Reverend Roger Plumpton Wilson,DD.

==== Commander of the Royal Victorian Order (CVO) ====
- Mary Goldie, MVO.
- Edmund Frank Grove, MVO.
- Major Sir Hew Fleetwood Hamilton-Dalrymple, Bt.
- Albert Montefiore Lake, MVO, OBE.
- Hugh Brown Mounsey, MVO.
- Leslie Alfred John Treby, MVO, MBE, BEM.
- The Very Reverend Henry Charles Whitley.

==== Member of the Royal Victorian Order (MVO) ====
At this time the two lowest classes of the Royal Victorian Order were "Member (fourth class)" and "Member (fifth class)", both with post-nominal letters MVO. "Member (fourth class)" was renamed "Lieutenant" (LVO) from the 1985 New Year Honours onwards.

Fourth Class

- Alezander William Allan.
- Captain Charles Barry George Baker, Irish Guards.
- Commander Hugh Maxwell Balfour, Royal Navy.
- Squadron Leader Richard Felix, Royal Air Force.
- Lady Mary Katharine Fitzalan-Howard.
- Squadron Leader Ronald Montgomery Kerr, AFC, Royal Air Force.
- John Llewellyn Powell, OBE.
- Peter Christie Mauldon Shillitoe, MBE.
- The Reverend Canon Rennie Simpson.

Fifth Class

- Sidney Burton, Superintendent, Norfolk Joint Police Force.
- James Davidson Duguid.
- Mary Alberth Gilbart.
- Norman Stanley Goode.
- Henry Reginald Hardy.
- George Richard Hart.
- Keith Howard.
- Alan Ross Thornton.

==== Medal of the Royal Victorian Order (RVM) ====
In Silver

- Francis Alfred Alexander.
- C1920774 Acting Flight Sergeant Michael John Cochlin, Royal Air Force.
- Edward Duddigan.
- Harold Charles James Gray, MBE.
- Andrew Grubb.
- Albert Jones.
- Chief Petty Officer Wilfred James Loveridge, J871457Q.
- Arthur Montgomery.
- Alfred William Pither.
- James Ian Reid.
- Maurice George Smith.

=== Order of the British Empire ===
==== Knight Grand Cross of the Order of the British Empire (GBE) ====
Civil Division

- Sir Hugh Walter Kingwell Wontner, CVO, Lord Mayor of London.

==== Dame Commander of the Order of the British Empire (DBE) ====
Civil Division

- Evelyn Joyce Denington, CBE, Chairman, Stevenage Development Corporation.

Diplomatic Service and Overseas List

- Barbara, Lady Jackson, lately Professor of International Development, Columbia University, U.S.A.

Australian States

State of Victoria

- Joan Hood Hammond, CMG, CBE, of Geelong. For distinguished services to music.

==== Knight Commander of the Order of the British Empire (KBE) ====
Military Division

- Vice Admiral Edward Gerard Napier Mansfield.
- Major-General Alexander James Wilson, CBE, MC, (180730), late Infantry, Colonel Commandant Queen's Division, Deputy Colonel (Lancashire) The Royal Regiment of Fusiliers.

Civil Division

- The Right Honourable Ailwyn Edward, Baron de Ramsey, TD, DL For services to agriculture.
- Sir Harry Greenfield, CSI, CIE, Lately President, International Narcotics Control Board.
- Ralph Bruce Verney, DL. For public services.

Australian States

State of New South Wales

- The Honourable Sir Asher Alexander Joel, OBE. For services to the community.

==== Commander of the Order of the British Empire (CBE) ====
Military Division

Royal Navy

- Captain Roy William Handcock, OBE.
- Captain Robert Harold James Knight, RD, Royal Naval Reserve
- Captain David Vaughan Morgan, MBE.
- Surgeon Captain Alan Peter Mayberry Nicol, MVO.

Army

- Brigadier Peter Herbert Benson, MBE, (352362), late Royal Corps of Transport.
- Lieutenant-Colonel (Honorary Colonel) Terence Arthur Cave (350706), Intelligence Corps, now R.A.R.O.
- Brigadier Michael James Palmer O'Cock, MC, ADC, (124478), late Foot Guards.
- Brigadier Leo Heathcote Plummer (262914), late Royal Regiment of Artillery.
- Brigadier Albert Alexander Seaton, MBE, (299322), late Corps of Royal Engineers.
- Colonel David George Carr Sutherland, MC, (108190), late Infantry, Territorial and Army Volunteer Reserve.
- Brigadier Ernest Peter James Williams (95081), late Corps of Royal Engineers.

Royal Air Force

- Group Captain Peter William Gilpin, DFC.
- Group Captain William Edward Hedley, OBE.
- Group Captain Walter Ormrod.
- Group Captain John Walter Gainer Smith, DFC.

Civil Division

- Gerald Ernest Heal Abraham. For services to music.
- Richard John Moreton Goold-Adams, Lately Chairman, Institute for Strategic Studies.
- Major John Marjoribanks Eskdale Askew, Convener, Berwickshire County Council.
- David Frederick Attenborough. For services to nature conservation.
- Cyril Bainbridge, OBE, Lately Senior, Administrative Medical Officer, Western Regional Hospital Board, Scotland.
- Arthur Vincent Barker, OBE, Member, British Railways Board.
- Stuart Lansdale Monteagle Barlow, Chairman, Federal Electric Holdings Ltd., and for services to Export.
- Richard David Barnett, lately Keeper of Western Asiatic Antiquities, British Museum.
- Kenneth Harry Blessley, MBE, Valuer and Estates Surveyor, Greater London Council.
- Reginald Norman Bottini, General Secretary, National Union of Agricultural and Allied Workers.
- Donald Eric Broadbent, FRS, Director, Medical Research Council Applied Psychology Unit.
- Arthur Joseph Brown, FBA, Professor of Economics, University of Leeds.
- John Norman Burrell, Chairman, Port of Tyne Authority.
- Harold Ernest Campbell. For services to civil engineering and transport in Northern Ireland.
- Irene Frances Candy, Member and Leader, Southampton City Council.
- Ian Vincent Carrel, Senior Technical Adviser, Ministry of Defence.
- Nancy Chater, Headmistress, Stanley Park Comprehensive School, Liverpool.
- Professor Alan Douglas Benson Clarke. For services to the Training Council for Teachers of the Mentally Handicapped.
- John Flavell Coales, OBE, FRS, Professor of Engineering (Control), University of Cambridge.
- Roland Antony Cookson, OBE, Director, Associated Lead Manufacturers Ltd.
- Malcolm Edward Cooper, President and Director, Allied Suppliers Ltd.
- John Sutton Curtis, Chairman, Thames Board Mills Ltd.
- Arthur Clifford Percival Davison, Conductor. For services to Music.
- John Ferguson Denholm, Chairman, Denholm Line Steamers.
- Professor Hugh Paterson Donald, lately Director, Agricultural Research Council Animal Breeding Research Organisation, Edinburgh.
- Cuthbert Drury, lately Group Export Co-ordinator, George Cohen 600 Group Ltd. For services to Export.
- The Right Honourable Frederick Anthony Hamilton, Baron Dulverton, TD. For charitable services.
- Henry Dumas, MC, Adviser on Marine Insurance.
- George Hopper Fletcher, Chairman, Allied Hambro Group.
- Roy Thomson Fletcher, MBE, lately Principal Medical Officer, Department of Health and Social Security.
- Neville Fullwood, HM Depute Senior Chief Inspector of Schools, Scottish Education Department.
- Mary George, MBE, Director and Secretary, Electrical Association for Women.
- Arthur Abraham Gold, Secretary, British Amateur Athletics Board.
- Alexander John Gordon, OBE, Architect.
- Charles Dymoke Green, OBE. For services to the Scout Association, particularly in the Commonwealth.
- Allen Harold Claude Greenwood, Deputy Chairman, British Aircraft Corporation Ltd. For services to Export.
- John Peter Grenside, Partner, Peat, Marwick, Mitchell & Company.
- Archibald William Hardie, ERD, Chairman, Irvine Development Corporation, Ayrshire.
- George Paull Munro Harrap, Chairman and Managing Director, George G. Harrap & Company Ltd.
- James Gayton Harries, MBE, lately Secretary for Education, Cornwall.
- John Richard Harrison, Senior Partner, J. Roger Preston & Partners.
- John Haynes, lately Chief Education Officer, Kent.
- Roger le Geyt Hetherington, OBE, Consultant, Binnie & Partners, Consulting Engineers.
- Samuel Leslie Hignett, lately Director of Veterinary Research, Wellcome Foundation.
- Albert Aubrey Houghton, Chairman, Mars Ltd. For services to Export.
- Charles Percy Hudson, Past President, British Trawlers' Federation Ltd.
- John Howell Hughes, Consultant Surgeon, Liverpool Royal Infirmary.
- Robert Frederick Hunt, Deputy Chairman, Dowty Group Ltd. For services to Export.
- James Ferguson Insch, Executive Deputy Chairman, Guest Keen & Nettlefolds Ltd. For services to Export.
- William Archibald Park Jack, lately President, Glasgow Chamber of Commerce.
- Eric Campbell Judd, MVO, Deputy Chairman and Joint Managing Director, United Africa Company International Ltd. For services to Export.
- Margaret Leighton (Mrs. Michael Wilding), Actress.
- Nelson Valdemar Linklater, OBE, Drama Director, The Arts Council of Great Britain.
- John Reid Curtis McGlashan, Foreign and Commonwealth Office.
- John McIntyre, Assistant Secretary, Home Office.
- Captain Alan Coulson Manson, Surveyor General, Marine Survey Service, Department of Trade.
- George Henry Merrell, QFSM, Chief Fire Officer, West Midlands Metropolitan County Fire Brigade.
- Peter James Thomas Morrill, Headmaster, Rickmansworth School.
- Thomas Gwilym Morris, QPM, DL, Chief Constable, South Wales Constabulary.
- Alec Henry Mortimer, Director General, British Independent Steel Producers Association.
- Deryck Ernest Mumford, Principal, Cambridgeshire College of Arts and Technology.
- Edwin Ronald Nixon, Managing Director, I.B.M. United Kingdom Holdings Ltd. For services to Export.
- Paul Robert Owen, FRS, Zaharoff Professor of Aviation, Imperial College of Science and Technology, University of London.
- Felix Harvey Spencer Palmer, T D., Chairman and Managing Director, Rauma-Repola (U.K.) Ltd.
- Colonel Joseph Eric Palmer, TD, DL, Lately Alderman and Chairman, Devon County Council.
- Merle Park (Merle Florence Bloch), Ballet Dancer.
- Austin William Pearce, Chairman and Chief Executive, Esso Petroleum Company Ltd.
- Stanley Edwards Peck, BEM, QPM, DL, President, United Kingdom Branch, Royal Life Saving Society.
- Ronald Hugh Peet, Chief Executive and Director, Legal and General Assurance Society Ltd. For services to handicapped children.
- Doris Avery-Radford, OBE, Lately Head of Housing Department, Women's Royal Voluntary Service.
- Arthur Morgan Rees, OBE, QPM, DL, Chief Constable, Staffordshire Police.
- Denis Edwin Roberts, MBE, Director of Postal Operations, Post Office.
- David Morrant Robinson. For services to the Young Men’s Christian Association.
- Thomas Stuart Rose, Design Adviser, Post Office.
- E. F. Schumacher, Founder-Chairman, Intermediate Technology Development Group Ltd.
- Peter Duncan Scott. For services to forensic psychiatry and the treatment of offenders.
- Geoffrey Layton Slack, OBE, TD, Professor of Dental Surgery, University of London.
- Edward Gillespie Smalley, Managing Director, Stone Platt Industries Ltd. For services to Export.
- Ian Bruce Sneddon, Consultant Dermatologist, United Sheffield Hospitals.
- Cyril Ernest Starling, Assistant Secretary, Ministry of Defence.
- Michael George Parke Stoker, FRS, Director, Imperial Cancer Research Fund Laboratories.
- James Sutherland, President of the Law Society of Scotland.
- Philip Richard Sweetman, Senior Principal Inspector of Taxes, Board of Inland Revenue.
- Thomas Taylor, OBE, Leader, Blackburn Borough Council.
- Henry George Webster, Director of Engineering, Austin/Morris Division, British Leyland Motor Corporation.
- James Douglas Whittaker, MBE, Secretary, Public Health Laboratory Service Board.
- Mansel Williams, Lately Director of Education, Caernarvonshire.
- Lieutenant-Colonel Alfred William Wilson, DSO, TD, DL, Lately President, Scottish Rugby Union.
- Hilary Derek Browning Wood, OBE, Chairman, Eastern Electricity Board.
- Sidney Lawrence Wright, Lately Medical Officer of Health, Croydon.
- Norman Arthur York, Headmaster, Royal Hospital School, Holbrook, Ministry of Defence.

Diplomatic Service and Overseas List

- Phillip Bannister, OBE. For services to Development in Malawi.
- Oswald Collins Cochrane. For services to British commercial interests in New York.
- Norman Alexander Daniel, OBE, British Council Representative, Egypt.
- Arthur Richard Franklin Dickson. For services to the administration of justice in Belize.
- Arthur Thomas Draper, Managing Director, Produce Marketing Board, The Gambia.
- John Reginald Gorman, CVO, MBE. For services to British interests in Canada.
- Francis David Hughes, OBE, British Council Representative, Canada.
- Joseph Madi. For services to British commercial interests and the British community in The Gambia.
- Lewis Langley Punnett. For community and public services in St. Vincent.
- Frederic Royston. For services to British commercial interests in the United States.
- Run Run Shaw. For services to the community in Hong Kong.
- Geoffrey William Smith. For services to banking in West Africa.
- Charles John Noel Will, OBE. For services to the British community in Calcutta.
- Reginald Eric Lennard Wingate, MBE. For services to British interests and the British community in Singapore.
- Wilfred Wong Sien-bing, OBE. For public services in Hong Kong.

Australian States

State of New South Wales

- William Allen Butterfield. For services to the State.
- Lindsay Charles Holmwood, New South Wales Executive Officer, Australian Constitutional Convention.
- James Claude Macdougall, OBE. For services to journalism.
- Albert Frederick Reddoch, Chairman of the Water Conservation and Irrigation Commission of New South Wales.
- Charles Robert Emerton Warren, OBE. For services to the community.

State of Victoria

- Gladys Bronwen Brown, JP, of Ivanhoe. For services to the community, particularly to the National Council of Women of Victoria.
- Maurice Vivian Clarke, of Ivanhoe. For services to medicine.
- Nigel Charles Manning, Dean of the Victorian College of Pharmacy.

State of Queensland

- Edward Cunningham, of Collinsville. For services to sport and the community in North Queensland.
- Peter Terance Crouch, of Brisbane. For services to the legal profession.

==== Officer of the Order of the British Empire (OBE) ====
Military Division

Royal Navy

- Commander Peter John Bing.
- Commander George Vincent Carter.
- Instructor Commander Quintin Des Clayes.
- Surgeon Commander David Hallen Elliott.
- Commander David James Farquharson.
- Commander Thomas Mark Bernard Firth.
- Commander Peter Frederick Martin.
- Chaplain (R.C.) Hugh Patrick Murphy, RD, Royal Naval Reserve.
- Lieutenant Commander Patrick Endell Dunstan Stearns.
- Commander Francis Edward Joseph Warren.

Army

- Lieutenant-Colonel Robert Barnes (351074), 52nd Lowland Volunteers, now R.A.R.O.
- Lieutenant-Colonel (Director of Music) Rodney Bowman Bashford, MBE, (462065) Grenadier Guards.
- Lieutenant-Colonel (now Colonel) John Alexander Creaney, TD, (429155), The Royal Irish Rangers (27th (Inniskilling) 83rd and 87th), Territorial and Army Volunteer Reserve.
- Lieutenant-Colonel Brian William Davis (400989), Royal Regiment of Artillery.
- Lieutenant-Colonel Jonathan Hugh Baillie Dent (400735), 1st The Queen's Dragoon Guards.
- Lieutenant-Colonel Murray Peter de Klee (370059), Scots Guards.
- Lieutenant-Colonel (Acting Colonel) John Gordon Richard Dixon (420828), Royal Tank Regiment.
- Lieutenant-Colonel Iain Murray Elliot (418255), 7th Duke of Edinburgh's Own Gurkha Rifles.
- Lieutenant-Colonel Alwyne Maudsley Gabb (334174), The Worcestershire and Sherwood Foresters Regiment (29th/45th Foot).
- Lieutenant-Colonel Cyril George Gutridge (56189), The Queen's Regiment, Combined Cadet Force.
- Lieutenant-Colonel James Farquhar Logan (335120), Queen's Own Highlanders (Seaforth and Camerons).
- Lieutenant-Colonel Guy Frederick Downer Long, MC, (109385), Royal Army Pay Corps.
- Major Basil James Muir, TD, MB, FFARCS, (419949), Royal Army Medical Corps, Territorial and Army Volunteer Reserve.
- Lieutenant-Colonel Clarence Henry Pardoe (235944), Royal Corps of Transport.
- Lieutenant-Colonel David Charles Part, TD, (413775), The Royal Yeomanry, Territorial and Army Volunteer Reserve.
- Lieutenant-Colonel Robert William Riddle (426988), The King's Own Scottish Borderers.
- Lieutenant-Colonel James St Clare Simmons (414974), The Royal Green Jackets.
- Lieutenant-Colonel Frederick Leslie Stowe (126059), Royal Regiment of Artillery, now Retired.
- Lieutenant-Colonel William Gaskell Wallace, TD (425883), The Royal Anglian Regiment, Territorial and Army Volunteer Reserve.
- Lieutenant-Colonel Paul Francis Wilson (430489), The King's Regiment.

Overseas Awards

- Lieutenant-Colonel Michael Leslie Darling, ED, Bermuda Regiment.

Royal Air Force

- Acting Group Captain (now Group Captain) Harry Davidson.
- Acting Group Captain Francis Edwin Doran.
- Wing Commander Alan Charles Curry (3511822).
- Wing Commander Norman George, MBE, (591499).
- Wing Commander Peter John Goulthorpe (583226).
- Wing Commander Raymond Anthony Hancock (583185).
- Wing Commander Robert Edward Jefferies, AFC, (1581445).
- Wing Commander William Francis Page, AFC, (2538877).
- Wing Commander John Kelvie Palmer (583010).
- Wing Commander George Wannan Turner, DFM, (127490).
- Wing Commander Peter Thomas George Webb (576835).
- Acting Wing Commander Stanley Owen Bavester (1537929), RAF Volunteer Reserve (Training Branch).

Civil Division

- William Drummond Abernethy, Director, Children and Youth Department, National Playing Fields Association.
- James David Adams, Principal Deputy Collector, Board of Customs and Excise.
- Hervey Alan. For services to Music.
- Eileen Alexander, Chairman, Movement and Dance Division, Central Council of Physical Recreation.
- Ernest George Allen, Regional Secretary, Southern Region, Transport and General Workers' Union.
- Roland Vincent Blair Arnaboldi, Director of Engineering, Thorn Consumer Electronics Ltd. For services to Export.
- Alan Talbert Auld, TD, Lately Chairman, Age Concern Scotland.
- Withiel George Leslie Austin. For public services in Surrey.
- Ambrose Leonard Awdry, MC, Crown Estate Receiver.
- Arthur Percival Aylen, Chairman, Board of Visitors, HM Prison, Eastchurch, Kent.
- Henry Baillie, Deputy Chief Constable, Royal Ulster Constabulary.
- George Vivian Muschamp Bainbridge, MBE, Chairman, Northumberland and Tyneside Council of Social Service.
- Aubrey Robert Batchelor, Secretary, Grampian Health Board.
- Shirley Cameron Becke, QPM, Lately Commander, Metropolitan Police.
- Edward Percy Bell, Member, Greater London Council.
- Irene Evelyn Fergusson-Bell. For services to physically disabled young people in Newham.
- James Bell, MC, Principal Scientific Officer, Explosives Research and Development Establishment, Waltham Abbey, Ministry of Defence.
- George Gordon Bickford, London Editor, Western Morning News and Western Evening Herald.
- Anthony Lionel Blackman, Chief Test Pilot, Hawker Siddeley Aviation Ltd., Manchester Division.
- Frank Edmund Blewett, Director, Quality Assurance, Electrical and Musical Industries Ltd.
- Frank Rowland Blott, Principal, Official Solicitor's Department.
- Kenneth Charles Booker, TD, Lately Chief Administrator, Newcastle University Hospital Management Committee.
- Reginald Bradley, TD, Lately County Surveyor, Essex County Council.
- Marcus Bridger, Head, School of Mathematics, Computing and Statistics, City of Leicester Polytechnic.
- Lottie Bristow, Senior Principal, Department of the Environment.
- Laura Gilbertson Brown, lately Chief Nursing Officer, Glasgow Royal Infirmary and Associated Hospitals.
- Lucy Matilda Brown. For services to the community in Bermondsey and Southwark.
- Marjorie Bucke, lately Assistant Director, Age Concern England.
- Henry John Richard Bussey. For services to cancer research at St. Mark's Hospital, London.
- Robert McAlpine McPherson Campbell, QPM, Deputy Chief Constable, Edinburgh Citv Police.
- Rhona Catherine Burgess Cash, Board Member, Redditch Development Corporation.
- Ian Carr Cathro, lately Chairman, Board of Management, Dundee Northern Hospitals.
- Charles Duncan Chapman, Town Clerk, Kirkcaldy.
- John Charlton. For services to Association Football.
- James Cyril Clancey, BEM, Chief Inspector, Medical Department, Greater London Council and Inner London Education Authority.
- Charles Peter Clarke, Chief Executive, Peterborough City Council.
- Peter Dodgson Collingwood, Weaver.
- Noel Albert Cory, Headmaster, Taxal Lodge Special Residential School, Whaley Bridge, Stockport.
- George Coulbeck, Chairman, Grimsby Fish Merchants' Association.
- Maurice James Crawt, lately Chief Engineer, Transmitters, British Broadcasting Corporation.
- Albin Crook, Chief Probation Officer, Mid-Glamorgan.
- Alexander Amsworth Cumming, Director, City Museum and Art Gallery, Plymouth.
- Professor David James Llewelfryn Davies. For services to law in Wales.
- Sarah Annie Davies. For services to the community in Port Talbot.
- Peter John Ralph Deller. General Medical Practitioner.
- Adriaan den Engelse. For services to land drainage in Suffolk and Norfolk.
- Thomas Norman Dent, lately Deputy Chairman, South West Gas, British Gas Corpoiation
- Roger Hubert Diplock, Director, Retail Trading Standards Association.
- Robert Dobson, HM Senior Electrical Inspector of Mines and Quarries, Department of Eneigy.
- Ernest Charles Doe. For services to agriculture in Essex.
- Gerald Carter Draper, Director, Travel Division, British Airways.
- Pamela Mary Dugdale, lately Deputy President, Gloucestershire Branch, British Red Cross Society.
- Kenneth Sandilands Duncan, MBE, lately General Secretary, British Olympic Association.
- Percival Charles Wyndham Duncum, Foreign and Commonwealth Office.
- Lewis Maybury Evans, HM Inspector of Schools, Department of Education and Science.
- Captain Henry William Newman Fane, lately Alderman, Kesteven County Council.
- John Fielding, Company Research Co-ordinator (Materials), Hawker Siddeley Aviation Ltd., Kingston upon Thames.
- Anthony Ray Flint, Senior Partner, Flint & Neill, Consulting Engineers.
- George Newberry Fox, General Secretary, The Leprosy Mission.
- Alan Thorpe Francis, Chairman, British Karate Control Commission.
- George Alfred Frearson, lately Managing Director and Chairman, Guest, Keen & Nettlefold Engineering Services Ltd. For services to industrial safety.
- Robert Reuben Freedland, Chairman, Board of Registration of Remedial Gymnasts; Rehabilitation Officer, Banbury Hospitals
- Gwendoline Olivia Gardiner, formerly Chief Nursing Officer, St. Mary's Hospital Group, London; Secretary, Association of Nurse Administrators.
- John Alexander Crawford Gibb, Member, Council of Management, Council for Small Industries in Rural Areas.
- Harold Charles Gray, Associate Conductor, City of Birmingham Symphony Orchestra.
- Mona Elizabeth Clara Grey, MBE, Chief Nursing Officer, Department of Health and Social Services, Northern Ireland.
- Eric Reginald Grief. For services to the community in Lincolnshire.
- Nigel St. John Groom, Technical Adviser, Ministry of Defence.
- Joseph Groome, lately Alderman, Ellesmere Port Borough Council.
- Eric Hackett, Headmaster, Slatyford School, Newcastle upon Tyne.
- Leslie Frank Hall. For services to Tribology.
- Marjorie Hall, Head Teacher, Ordsall High School, Salford.
- Sheila Hancock (Sheila Cameron Thaw), Actress.
- Lancelot Hugh Alers Hankey, Secretary, Incorporated Association of Preparatory Schools.
- The Reverend Canon John Westland Hanson, Civilian Chaplain, RAF Manby.
- Jesse Leslie Hardcastle, Controller, National Film Theatre.
- Farrukh Siyar Hashmi. For services to Race Relations.
- Harold Haywood, Director of Youth Work, National Association of Youth Clubs.
- Norman Joseph Heaney, lately Clerk to the Battle Rural District Council, Sussex.
- Lady Mary Constance Hesketh, District Superintendent (Nursing), Duke of Lancaster's District, St. John Ambulance Association and Brigade.
- William Eric George Hewings, lately Secretary, London Transport Executive.
- Robert Eric Hicks, Chief Information Officer B, Central Office of Information.
- Charles Hilton, Principal Planning Inspector, Department of the Environment.
- Mary Hornsby, Principal, Home Office.
- John Francis Howe, formerly Principal, Ministry of Defence.
- George Morris Howes, DFC, Assistant Director of Establishments, Greater London Council.
- Irene Elsie Howorth, formerly Principal Senior Medical Officer, Lancashire.
- Leonard George Hudson, Group Manager, Peninsular & Oriental Steam Navigation Company.
- Alfred Pinel Hughes, lately General Secretary, British Waste Paper Association.
- Kathleen Hughes, Headmistress, Dunsmore School for Girls, Rugby, Warwickshire.
- Edward Lacy-Hulbert, Chairman, Croydon, Sutton and District Disablement Advisory Committee; Chairman, Croydon and Sutton Local Employment Committee.
- Robert Graham Hunt, General Dental Practitioner, Torquay.
- John Raymond Hunter, Director, Western Area, National Coal Board.
- Randal Thomas Huston, Managing Director, McLaughlin & Harvey Ltd., Belfast.
- Robert James Inglis, Principal, Scottish Home and Health Department.
- Colonel Frederick Walter James, TD, DL. For services to the Army Cadet Force in the West Midlands.
- Daniel Johnston, Head of Industrial Design, Design Council.
- Cecelia Lamont Jones, Principal, Ministry of Defence.
- Douglas William Kent-Jones. For services to the food industry.
- Olive Walden Jones, lately Principal Nursing Officer (Teaching Division), London.
- Thomas Duncan Jones, Chief Fire Officer, Cornwall Fire Brigade.
- Brendan Kevin Kelly, Head of Computer Services Centre, Medical Research Council.
- Norman Stewart McMutrie Kemp, Head, Membership Department, The Stock Exchange.
- Eileen Maud Chrystal King. For services to the organisation of voluntary service in hospitals.
- Alan Dron Lacey, Chairman, Surrey Wing, Air Training Corps.
- Peter Benjamin Lauder, Constructor, Directorate of Project Team (Submarines), Ministry of Defence.
- Gwynne Daniel Lloyd, General Dental Practitioner, Llanelli.
- Henry John Lowe, lately County Director of Planning, Nottinghamshire County Council.
- Norman McArthur Macaulay, Head Teacher, Knightswood Secondary School, Glasgow.
- Donald MacKay McBain, President, District Councils' Association for Scotland.
- Angus Fraser McIntosh, TD, President, British Pest Control Association
- Alastair Uilleam Mackinnon, General Medical Practitioner, Leeds.
- Kenneth Lionel Macmillan, Deputy Editor, Nottingham Evening Post.
- George Magrill, Chairman, Edinburgh and District Local Employment Committee.
- Roy Alfred Sidney Manger, Deputy Director of Control (Operations) 4, Civil Aviation Authority
- Robert Lascelles Mann, lately Foreign and Commonwealth Office.
- George Inglis Manson, General Medical Practitioner, Peterhead, and for services at Peterhead Prison.
- David John Martin, Chief Engineer, Special Projects, Plessey Development Laboratories.
- Leslie Vernon Martin, Senior Principal, Ministry of Overseas Development.
- Ernest Edgar Mason, Head Postmaster, Belfast, Northern Ireland Postal and Telecommunications Board.
- Derrick John Matthews, General Manager, Sales and Marketing, Coles Cranes Ltd. For services to Export.
- Peter Jack Matthews, QPM, Chief Constable, Surrey Constabulary.
- Lieutenant-Commander Richard Burgess Michell, DSC, Royal Navy (Retd.), Manager, Naval Division, Decca Radar Ltd. For services to Export.
- Arthur Campbell Miles, Manager and Secretary, British Insurance (Atomic Energy) Committee.
- Dennis Reginald Molloy, Personnel Director, Remploy Ltd.
- Fred Morris. For charitable services to hospitals in Birmingham.
- Lieutenant-Colonel George Herbert Mount, TD. For services to the Magistracy in Canterbury.
- William John Murison, lately County Librarian, West Riding of Yorkshire.
- Minnie Nichols, Chairman, Exeter Council for Voluntary Service.
- Walter Nurnberg, Head, Guildford School of Photography, West Surrey College of Art and Design. For services to industrial photography.
- James William Oatley, lately Divisional Architect, Greater London Council.
- Eric Rolf Eugene Olsson, Senior Legal Assistant, Department of Trade.
- Hugh Charles Orr, President, Association of Independent Cinemas.
- Edward Arthur Orsborn, Head Teacher, Julian's Primary School, London.
- Clifford Warne Othen, Senior Lecturer in Education, University College, Cardiff.
- Howard Morgan Page, General Manager and Director, British Petroleum Refinery (Llandarcy) Ltd.
- George Duncan Painter, Assistant Keeper 1, British Museum.
- Marianne Parry, Chairman, National Nursery Examination Board.
- Marjorie Perraton. For services to local government in Hampshire.
- Prudence Eileen Peskett, Organiser, Voluntary Service Bureau, Belfast Council of Social Welfare.
- Cecily Matcham Pledger, MBE, Director, South Asia Department, The British Council.
- George Teodor Pop, Business Adviser, Romania. For services to Export.
- John Henry Prevett, Partner, Bacon & Woodrow, Consulting Actuaries. For services to handicapped children.
- James Gilbert Purdy, lately Alderman, Cheshire County Council.
- Vincent Cartledge Reddish, Senior Principal Scientific Officer, Royal Observatory, Edinburgh, Science Research Council.
- Gertrude Phoebe Meirion Rees. For services to drama in Somerset.
- George Hoey Reid, Secretary, Purdysburn Hospital Management Committee, Belfast.
- John Joseph Donald Rivers, MBE. For services to the Royal British Legion.
- John Stanley Robson, Chairman, Panel of Assessors for District, Nurse Training, London
- John Broadbent Ross, lately County Planning Officer, Northumberland County Council.
- Humphrey John Salwey. For services to the Magistracy in Winchester.
- Joseph Samuels, lately Chairman, East London Group Hospital Management Committee.
- Colin Ernest Kerr Scouller, lately Director of Economic Affairs, Chemical Industries Association.
- James Walker Seddon, lately Water Engineer, Leicester City Council.
- William Shankly, Manager, Liverpool Football Club.
- Reginald Charles Sharphouse, lately Treasurer, North-West Metropolitan Regional Hospital Board.
- Tom Shaw, MBE, Chairman, London Region, National Savings Committee.
- Frederick James Sheppard, MC, QPM, Deputy Assistant Commissioner, Metropolitan Police.
- Henry John Sheppard, Head of Engineering, The Electricity Council.
- Norman Wade Slack, lately Chairman, Hull National Insurance Tribunal.
- Alan McLelland Cockburn Smith, Company Executive, Consolidated Gold Fields Ltd.
- Alexander Murray Smith, General Manager and Engineer, Dundee Harbour Trust.
- Douglas Holdich Smith, BEM. For services to the Potato Trade.
- Rodney Nevil Warington Smyth, Managing Director, Falmouth Chandlers Ltd and Merthen Trust Ltd. For services to Export.
- John Mervyn Southam, Principal, Department of Health and Social Security.
- John Speechley, Deputy Managing Director, Westland Helicopters Ltd. For services to Export.
- James Stables, Clerk to Carlisle and Wigton Justices.
- Agnes Desiree Stevens, Principal, Northern Ireland Office.
- John Stevenson, MBE, Member, Board of Governors, West of Scotland Agricultural College.
- James Nichols Stothert, lately Town Clerk and Chief Executive, Borough of Royal Leamington Spa.
- Wilfred Morley Stuart, lately Editor, Official Report of Debates, House of Lords.
- John Harrison Sutcliffe, lately Alderman, Burnley County Borough Council.
- Eric William Swetman, Director, Association of British Launderers & Cleaners Ltd.
- John Henry Alan Swinson, Chairman, Catering Industry Training Board for Northern Ireland.
- Alexander William Tait, lately Director, Policy Review, British Railways Board.
- Reginald George Taylor, Principal, Ministry of Agriculture, Fisheries and Food.
- Edith Madge Teague, lately Director of Nursing Services, Cornwall County Council.
- Brian Leetham Peart Terry, MBE, Commercial Director, The M.E.L. Equipment Company Ltd. For services to Export.
- Lewis John Wynford Vaughan-Thomas, Director, Harlech Television Ltd. For services to Wales.
- James Watson Tweedie, Executive Director, Scottish Bus Group Ltd.
- Gertrude Mary Wade, Chairman, Board of Visitors, HM Detention Centre, Whatton.
- Duncan James Park Walker, Chief Fire Officer, Durham County Fire Brigade.
- Stanley Hewitt Walker, Director, Redcar Development, British Steel Corporation.
- Douglas Clark Wallace, lately Chairman, Fife National Health Service Executive Council.
- Robert Brown Walton, Senior Principal, Department of Employment.
- Alfred Henry Weeks. For services to oversea students.
- David Marstone Wheble, Deputy Assistant Paymaster General and Finance Officer.
- George James White, Commercial Director, Bexford Ltd. For services to Export.
- The Reverend David John Mihangel Williams. For services to local government in North Wales.
- Leonard Albert Wiseman, Director of Research, The Cotton, Silk and Man-made Fibres Research Association.
- Norman Arthur Evans Wood, Principal Professional and Technology Officer, Department of the Environment.
- Robert Lawton Yarr, lately Chairman, Northern Ireland Association of Boys' Clubs.

Diplomatic Service and Overseas List

- Samuel Arthur Josiah Adolphus, QPM, BEM, Commissioner of Police, Belize.
- Gerald Stuart Atkinson. For educational services to the community in Switzerland.
- Godfrey Turner Baker, TD. For services to British interests and the British community in Lyons.
- Daniel Otto Benzimra. For services to British commercial interests in Kenya.
- Alan Naismith Binder. For services to the British community in the Khmer Republic.
- Geoffrey Gibson Bisley, Eye Specialist, Government of Kenya.
- George Allston Bridges, British Council Representative, Hong Kong.
- Jack Brookfield. For services to Anglo-Malawi relations.
- Robert Peyton Burnett. For services to the British community in New York.
- William Campbell, Under-Secretary, Ministry of Finance, Swaziland.
- Chow Chung-kai. For services to commerce in Hong Kong.
- Charles James Clark, Director, British Council Institute, Bologna.
- John Edward Douglas Clinton. For services to the community in Malaysia.
- William Warren Connolly. For public services in the Cayman Islands.
- Felix Harry Cook. For services to the British community in Lisbon.
- John Douglas Charlton Cowl, MBE, DFC. For services to British commercial interests and the British community in Bilbao.
- Basil Michael Davies. For services to British commercial interests and the British community in Iran.
- William Francis John Davis. For services to British commercial interests and the British community in Karachi
- George Dickson, First Secretary (Commercial) HM Embassy, Jakarta.
- Frank Scougal Dorward. For services to forestry development in Swaziland.
- Clifford Ernest Dowling. For services to British commercial interests in New Zealand.
- Romildo Jean Henri Farrugia, MBE. For services to British interests in Sfax, Tunisia.
- Vere Edward Horace Fenner, Chief Executive Officer, Swaziland Railways.
- John Stuart Flatt. For services to Development in Nepal.
- Alan Fleming. For services to British interests in Nigeria and Anglo-Nigerian relations.
- John Norman Forsyth. For services to British commercial interests in Italy.
- Kingsley Richard Fox, Honorary British Consul, Guayaquil, Ecuador.
- Trevor Thomas Gatty, lately First Secretary, Foreign and Commonwealth Office.
- Edmund Graham Gibbons. For public services in Bermuda.
- Francis Joseph Glynn. For services to Development in Botswana.
- William Bernard Hemingway. For services to British commercial interests in Frankfurt.
- Walter Hume, Registrar General, Hong Kong.
- Anthony John Hunter, Chief Secretary, Gilbert and Elhce Islands Colony.
- Sydney Ingham. For services to the British community in Lisbon.
- Mary Diana Helen Inkpen. For services to education in Ethiopia.
- Donald Alexandre Kealman, Honorary British Consul, Santos, Brazil.
- Mariano Kelesi. For public services in the British Solomon Islands Protectorate.
- John Patrick Gerrard Kemball, MBE. For services to British commercial interests in Mozambique.
- Leslie Hector George Kent. For services to British interests in Belgium.
- Brigadier Rainald Gilfrid Lewthwaite, MC, Director of Protocol, Hong Kong.
- Peter Desmond Oswald Liddell. For services to Anglo-Nigerian relations.
- John McKeown. For services to the British community in Malaysia.
- Charles Alfred Male, General Manager, Hong Kong Telephone Company.
- Henry Ranald Martin. For services to the development of stock-breeding in Uruguay.
- Brian Miller. First Secretary (Administration), H M. Embassy, Berlin.
- Robert Alan Minchell, Director of Surveys, Government of Malawi.
- James Douglas Moir, Chief Agricultural Officer, Ministry of Agriculture, Lesotho.
- Wilfred Donald Dundas Orde, MBE. For services to British commercial interests in Bahrain.
- Charles Andrew Pearson. For services to medicine in Nigeria.
- Howard Reynold Penn, MBE. For public and community services in the British Virgin Islands.
- Cecil Eric Prescott, JP. For public services in Gibraltar.
- Leonard Sidney Price, First Secretary and Head of Chancery, British High Commission, Suva.
- Frank Arrowsmith Reynolds, First Secretary and Head of Chancery, British High Commission, Maseru.
- William Walton Rigbye, Director of Design, Ministry of Works and Supplies, Malawi
- William Ernest Roach, British Council Regional Director, Berlin.
- Philip Lyon Roussel, British Council Representative, Belgium.
- Horace Wilmot Scallon. For services to British interests and the British community in Assam.
- Godfrey Amund Sommerfield. For services to the British community in Thailand and Anglo-Thai relations.
- John Christopher Stephens, Deputy Secretary, Ministry of Agriculture and Natural Resources, Malawi.
- William Alfred Stuff. For services to banking and the British community in Calcutta.
- Richard Gilbert Tallboys, lately First Secretary, HM Embassy, Phnom Penh.
- John Tessier-Yandell. For services to the British community in Assam.
- George Matthew Topen. For services to British interests and the British community in Colombo.
- Emmanuel Tragoutsi, MBE, Attaché, HM Embassy, Athens.
- Paul Julian Treadwell, Attorney General, British National Service, Condominium of the New Hebrides.
- Joseph Walton. For services to commerce and the community in the British Solomon Islands Protectorate.
- Percy Thomas Warr, lately Director of Audit, Hong Kong.
- George Hannam Webb, lately First Secretary, British High Commission Accra.
- Michael Miles Whiteley. For services to medicine in Bahrain.
- Geoffrey Owen Whittaker, MBE, Colonial Treasurer, St. Helena.
- Leslie Robert Whittaker, Specialist in Radiology, Government of Kenya.
- Orby Bernard Wise, lately Revenue Adviser, Kano State Government, Nigeria.
- James Wu Man-hon. For services to the community and commerce in Hong Kong.

Australian States

State of New South Wales

- Lorna May Aboud. for services to the community.
- Bruce Neil Procter Benjamin. For services to medicine.
- The Reverend Canon Frank Leslie Cuttriss. For services to the Church of England and the community.
- The Right Reverend Monsignor James Francis Delaney. For services to the community and the Roman Catholic Church.
- The Reverend Brother John Dominic Healy, MBE. For services to education.
- Edward Joseph Heath. For services to the community.
- Enid Joan Lander. For services to the community.
- Robin Casper Lovejoy. For services to the theatre.
- Stanley Richard Masters. For services to commerce.
- Robert Pikler. For services to music.
- Russell Blair Prowse. For services to the community.
- James Rawson Reeves. For services to sport.
- Henry Oswald Gerald Selle. For services to medicine.
- Ian Francis Patrick Smith. For services to journalism.
- William Humphrey Stephenson. For services to the broadcasting industry.

State of Victoria

- Leslie James Blake, of Karingal. For services to education, historical matters and the community.
- Margaret Brennan, JP, of Bendigo. For services to the community.
- Leo Reoch Cohn, of Bendigo. For services to the community.
- John Edmund Collins, of North Brighton. For services to the retail motor industry.
- Rodney Disney Davidson, of Toorak. For services in preserving the national heritage.
- Councillor Stanley Arthur Hawken, JP, of Mentone. For services to local government and the community.
- William Eric Archer Hughes-Jones, of Camberwell. For services to medicine.
- Patrick Bernard Leach, of Walpeup. For services to Primary Producers.
- Eric Keith Mackay, of Brighton. For services to architecture.
- Florence Raines, of Northcote. For services to the mentally ill.
- Albertus Diederik Johan Stoutjesdijk, of Hopetoun. For services to medicine and the community.
- Lionel Lewis Walter, JP, of Point Lonsdale. For services as a municipal administrator.

State of Queensland

- Dorothy Agnes Carstens, of Burleigh Heads. For services to charity and the community.
- Edwin Robert Jackson, of Brisbane. For services to journalism.
- Playford D'Arcy O'Connor, of Torquay. For services to medicine and the people of Western Queensland.
- Archie Andrew Steinbeck, of Brisbane. For meritorious services to youth and the sport of swimming.
- Cecil Robert Thiess, of Brisbane. For his contribution to development.

State of Western Australia

- James George Burnett, JP, Mayor of South Perth.
- Councillor Manuel Starke, JP, of Stirling. For services to local government and to medicine.

==== Member of the Order of the British Empire (MBE) ====
Military Division

Royal Navy

- Lieutenant (MS) William John Blake.
- Lieutenant Commander Thomas William Bradley.
- Lieutenant Commander (SD) Raymond James Brend.
- Lieutenant Commander Patrick John Mortimer Canter, DSC.
- Lieutenant Commander (SD) William Walter Dennis.
- Lieutenant Commander (SCC) Thomas Dewhurst, Royal Naval Reserve.
- Lieutenant Commander Thomas Philip Heard.
- Lieutenant Commander (SD) Donald Edward Holloway.
- Fleet Chief Electrician (Air) John Horatio Somerville Lach-Szyrma, F816S63T.
- Acting Commander John Macdonald Mackay.
- Captain (SD) Ronald Wilson Winthrop, Royal Marines.

Army

- Captain (Quartermaster) Leslie William Abbott (485395), Royal Regiment of Artillery.
- Captain (Adviser Infantry Weapons) Norman Allred (487079), Small Arms School Corps
- Lieutenant (Acting Major) Walter Frederick Badcock (456796), Army Cadet Force
- 23771253 Warrant Officer Class 2 Peter William Boden, Corps of Royal Military Police.
- Major David George Bryan (445803), Royal Regiment of Artillery.
- Major Roy Charles Burman (198424), Corps of Royal Engineers, now R A.R.O.
- Captain George Christie Clark Craft (489666), The Royal Highland Fusiliers (Princess Margaret's Own Glasgow and Ayrshire Regiment).
- Major Robert Alexander Davidson (414635), 51st Highland Volunteers, Territorial and Army Volunteer Reserve.
- Captain (Quartermaster) Harold Wallace Dee (480635), The Light Infantry.
- Captain John Dowd (477987), Army Catering Corps.
- Captain Hedley Dennis Cardew Duncan (480288), Royal Tank Regiment.
- Captain James Drew Fielden (484844), Royal Corps of Transport.
- Captain (Quartermaster) Richard Eric Fletcher (485264), Welsh Guards.
- Captain (Acting Major) Rex Edmund Goddard, TD, (177002), Combined Cadet Force.
- W/382613 Warrant Officer Class I Barbara Lily Rosina Hammond, Women's Royal Army Corps.
- Major Robert George Hanna (489403), Ulster Defence Regiment.
- Captain (Acting Major) Thomas Docherty Hawkins (488229), Corps of Royal Engineers.
- Major Richard George Rowley Hill (384232), The Yorkshire Volunteers, now R.A.R.O.
- 22976970 Warrant Officer Class 2 Clarence Edward Hinchliff, Royal Army Ordnance Corps.
- Major Michael Frederick Hobbs (447271), Grenadier Guards.
- 22880642 Warrant Officer Class I George Alexander Keith, Corps of Royal Military Police.
- Captain (Acting Major) Nicholas Arthur King (471294), The Light Infantry.
- Major John Alexander MacCallum (451283), Queen's Own Highlanders (Seaforth & Camerons).
- Major Shaw McCloghry (373142), Corps of Royal Engineers, now R.A.R O.
- Lieutenant Gilbert McGilvray (496963), Royal Corps of Signals.
- Major (Quartermaster) Eric Reginald Miller (466731), Royal Regiment of Artillery.
- Major Patrick Humphrey Morrish (416009), Royal Regiment of Artillery, Territorial and Army Volunteer Reserve.
- Captain William John Orr (474904), Royal Corps of Transport.
- Major (Quartermaster) Douglas Haig Payne (438257), The Queen's Own Hussars.
- Major Richard Francis Scott (373650), Corps of Royal Engineers.
- Captain Stanley Sedman (491108), The Light Infantry.
- 22246327 Warrant Officer Class 2 (Acting Warrant Officer Class I) Brian Shotliff, Corps of Royal Electrical and Mechanical Engineers.
- Major (Acting Lieutenant Colonel) Peter John Sincock (449057), The Royal Anglian Regiment.
- 22544516 Warrant Officer Class 2 Derek Harold Slater, Royal Tank Regiment.
- 1948655 Warrant Officer Class 2 (Local Warrant Officer Class I) Phillip Henry Sleep, Corps of Royal Engineers.
- 22251604 Warrant Officer Class I Peter Bernard Smith, The Queen's Royal Irish Hussars.
- Captain (Queen's Gurkha Officer) Hastabahadur Thapa (483069), 2nd King Edward Vii's Own Gurkha Rifles (The Sirmoor Rifles).
- Major Michael Thomson (463491), The King's Own Scottish Borderers.
- Captain Stanley Upton (486181), Corps of Royal Military Police.
- Major Anthony Whittall (457308), Royal Corps of Transport.
- 22340729 Warrant Officer Class I Richard Woodward, Army Catering Corps.

Overseas Awards

- Major Lee Chi-ping, ED, Hong Kong Regiment.
- Warrant Officer Class 2 Carlos Jacinto Pintos, Hong Kong Regiment.

Royal Air Force

- Acting Wing Commander Michael Raymond Storm Wismark (609049).
- Squadron Leader James Arthur Bayliss (608225).
- Squadron Leader John Ernest Bussey (4149103).
- Squadron Leader Jack Butteriss (168514).
- Squadron Leader Ian Charles Hamilton Dick, AFC, (608203).
- Squadron Leader Michael Phillips Donaldson (4231722).
- Squadron Leader Philip Frank Harris (2360146).
- Squadron Leader Edmund Vincent Hughes (58513), (Retired).
- Squadron Leader William Lawrence McFarlane (4220062).
- Squadron Leader Bryan Eyles Morgan (506508).
- Squadron Leader Brian Philip North (680854).
- Squadron Leader Laurence O'Hara (4164013).
- Squadron Leader Ronald George Penniall (2502611).
- Squadron Leader Eric Frank Tovell (59247).
- Acting Squadron Leader Arthur Norman Crookes, DFC, (135428), RAF Volunteer Reserve (Training Branch).
- Flight Lieutenant Eric Banks (4040326).
- Flight Lieutenant David Stanley Burden, AFC, (4032549).
- Flight Lieutenant Malcolm Gleave (4232774).
- Flight Lieutenant William Michael Kendall (549745), RAF Regiment.
- Flight Lieutenant John Finnian Molloy (181332).
- Flight Lieutenant Robert Cummings Thornton (199656).
- Warrant Officer Donald John Ferguson (B2736788).
- Warrant Officer Wilfred Hardy (U4001246).
- Warrant Officer James Higgs, BEM, (X0947658), RAF Regiment.
- Warrant Officer Daryl Patton (U1050574).
- Warrant Officer Eric Albert Salmon (J1819110).
- Warrant Officer John George Sidell (W0625129).
- Warrant Officer Gordon Graham Thomas (X0550947).
- Master Navigator Rex Ernest Griffiths (F1588120).

Civil Division

- Charles Henry Ronald Achilles, Deputy Clerk to the Justices of the Petty Sessional Division of Burnham, Buckinghamshire.
- Commander Charles Poynder Adams, DSC, Royal Navy (Retd.), Inspector, HM Coastguard, Department of Trade.
- Margaret Hamilton Barrie Aitken. For services to the community in Airdrie.
- Henrietta Ake. For services to youth in Kingston-upon-Hull, and especially to the Girls' Brigade.
- Frederick Stephen Aldis. For services to children in Barking and Dagenham.
- Sheila St. Johnston Allen. For services to the community in Birmingham.
- Marjorie Anderson (Marjorie Enid Sykes). For services to Broadcasting.
- Moira McLaggan Anderson, Catering Officer for hospitals in the Aberdeen area.
- Cyril John Andrew, Chairman, Walsall Savings Committee.
- John Stanley Armitage, Founder and Chairman, Brighouse Storthes Hall Society, Yorkshire.
- Edward Calvert Armstrong, Town Clerk and Burgh Chamberlain, Langholm, Dumfries.
- Leslie John Arnott, Sales Director, Gullick Dobson (Export) Ltd. For services to Export.
- Mary Ash, Vice-Principal, South Fields College of Further Education, Leicester.
- Denis Henry Ashworth, Technical Director, Simon Engineering Dudley Ltd. For services to Export.
- Ronald James Auckland, DFC, Senior Executive Officer, Ministry of Defence.
- Sidney Reginald Badley, Member, Plastics Steering Committee, Chemicals Economic Development Committee.
- Islwyn Bale, lately Chief Clerk, Security Department, Llanwern Group, Strip Mills Division, British Steel Corporation.
- Ronald William Barlow, Chief Superintendent, Cambridgeshire Constabulary.
- Dorothy Alice Barton. For services to the National Trust.
- Thomas Henry Bass, Chief Office Assistant, House of Lords.
- Albert Ernest Bassett, Executive Officer, Ministry of Defence.
- Eric Baxter, Deputy to Executive Director (Production) (Chester) and Chief Production Liaison Manager, A300B Airbus, Hawker Siddeley Aviation Ltd.
- William Henderson Baxter, Member, Tayside Area Health Board.
- John Beale, Head of Department of Mathematics, Statistics and Computing, North Gloucestershire College of Technology.
- Rose Lilian Bedford, Executive Officer, Ministry of Agriculture, Fisheries, and Food.
- Howard Beecher, General Editor, Citizens' Advice Notes.
- Olive Edith Bell, lately District Nurse and Midwife, Kent County Council.
- Richard Bell, Head Warden, North York Moors National Park.
- Arthur Belsey, Executive Officer, Trinity House Lighthouse Service.
- Marguerite Doreen Berry, Deputy Director, Great Britain/East Europe Centre.
- Betty Kathleen Janet Bettis, Senior Executive Officer, Ministry of Defence.
- Richard Charles Bird, Chairman and Managing Director, Petbow, Ltd, Sandwich, Kent. For services to Export.
- Joseph Elliott Blackburn, Works Manager, Thermega Ltd., Leatherhead.
- Betty Blundell, Executive Officer, Pneumoconiosis Unit, Medical Research Council.
- Roy Bohana, Assistant Director and Head of Music Department, Welsh Arts Council.
- Violet Vansittart Boulnois. For services to the Victoria League for Commonwealth Friendship.
- Vera Bower, Headmistress, Macaulay First School, Grimsby.
- Gladys Bradley, Secretary, Stockport, National Federation of Old Age Pensions Associations.
- Cyril Walter Bramhall, Assistant Division Officer, Ordnance Survey.
- Charles Cyril Michael Bransby, Assistant General Secretary, National Union of Sheetmetal Workers, Coppersmiths and Heating and Domestic Engineers.
- Edward Bridger, lately Chief Cardiological Technician, Middlesex Hospital.
- Robert Allan Broadbent, Higher Executive Officer, Board of Customs and Excise.
- Peggy Irene Buck, Executive Officer, Welsh Office.
- Austin Wyeth Bunch. For services to the British Limbless Ex-Service Men's Association.
- Frank James Burge, Chief Operating Manager, York, Eastern Region, British Railways Board.
- James Arthur Butterworth, Chairman, Rochdale and Bury National Insurance Tribunal.
- Robert McNeil Cadenhead, General Medical Practitioner, Lerwick, Shetland.
- Harry Calvert, Chief Clerk, Blackpool County Court.
- Ian Alexander Campbell, ERD, Architect, Building Division, Common Services Agency, Scottish Health Service.
- Agnes Ross Macdonald Carlile, Executive Officer, Department of Industry.
- Thomas James Carr, Artist.
- Harry Wesley Carrington, lately Deputy Chief News Editor, Press Association Ltd.
- Jack Carrington, Secretary, London Borough of Waltham Forest Savings Committee.
- Norman Chambers, Senior Executive Officer, Department for National Savings.
- George Edgar Chipperfield, Senior Executive Officer, HM Procurator General and Treasury Solicitor.
- Ronald Cyril Chirnside. For services to the Tyne Boys' Club, Tynemouth.
- William Ellis Clarke, lately Town Clerk, Thetford Borough Council, Norfolk.
- Arthur Clayton, Chief Fire and Security Officer, Grangemouth Chemicals Factory, B.P. Chemicals International Ltd.
- Roydon Benjamin Coe, Director, KenRoy Thompson Ltd., Stationers, Plymouth.
- Philip Collin, Secretary and Deputy Managing Director, Tees and Hartlepool Port Authority.
- Elspeth Barbour Cooper, Commandant, Scottish Branch, British Red Cross Society.
- William Claud Copeman, Higher Executive Officer, Board of Inland Revenue.
- Agnes Mitchell Copland, Prison Chaplain's Assistant, HM Institution, Greenock.
- John Roy Cotter, Editorial Facilities Organiser, Independent Television News Ltd.
- Thomas Herbert Coulter, Staff Officer, Department of Education, Northern Ireland.
- William John Coysh. For services to the Torbay and South West of England Festival.
- George Arthur Crabb, Headmaster, Gowriehill Primary School, Dundee.
- Dorothy Hall Cragg, Teacher Adviser in Nursery Education, Northumberland Local Education Authority.
- Margaret Ethel Creelman, Executive Officer, Home Office.
- Patricia Barbara Cropper (Miss Patricia Lowe). For services to athletics.
- Cicely Crosby, Senior Personal Secretary, Parliamentary Counsel Office.
- Herbert Charles Crowne, lately Higher Executive Officer, HM Stationery Office.
- George Albert Cubitt, General Secretary, Camping Club of Great Britain and Ireland.
- Mary Elizabeth Cunningham, Principal, Occupational Therapy Training Centre, Astley Ainslie Hospital, Edinburgh.
- John Oliver Darlington, Organiser, Road Safety, Midland Region, ROSPA.
- Alice Frances Davies, Executive Officer, Cabinet Office.
- Mary Maud Hampton Pudsey-Dawson. For services to the community in Tenby, Pembrokeshire.
- Rubert William Dearle, lately Senior Executive Officer, Department of Health and Social Security.
- Kenneth Charles Denley, Secretary, Society of Radiographers.
- Joseph Howard Dennis, Building Supervisor, East Sussex Area Health Authority.
- Lawrence Emmanuel de Souza, Export Merchant and Consultant.
- George Francis Devenish, Senior Technical Instructor, School of Graphic Design, Royal College of Art.
- Eric Blundell Dilworth, Clerk of Works, Skelmersdale Development Corporation, Lancashire.
- Frank Dinn, Chief Supenntendent, Merseyside Police.
- Lieutenant-Colonel John Jopp Fairlie Dobbs, DL, Deputy-Secretary, Yorkshire and Humberside Territorial Auxiliary and Volunteer Reserve Association.
- Harold Doolittle, lately Member, Kidderminster Rural District Council.
- Maud Theresa Dott, Clerical Assistant, London Transport Executive.
- Enid Isabelle Mary Dunlop, Chairman, West Sussex Street, Village and Social Savings Groups Committee.
- Dorothy Lichigaray Dunsford, Nursing Officer, Royal Albert Edward Infirmary, Wigan.
- Leonard Parker Dutton. For services to the community in Giggleswick, Yorkshire.
- Margaret Louise Dyer, Nursing Officer in Charge, Cheam Hospital, Surrey.
- Robert Edward, Immigration Service Manager, Securicor Ltd.
- Willie Shepherd Edwards. For services to the community in Wardle, Rochdale.
- Nancy Conchar Elder. For services to chess in Scotland.
- David Ernest Ellis, Senior Information Officer, Department of Health and Social Security.
- John Victor Ellis, National Secretary, Training Development Association Ltd.
- Esther Ann Evans, lately Director of Nursing Services, Westminster City Council.
- Francis John Evans, County Consumer Protection Officer, Northamptonshire County Council.
- Mary Elizabeth Evans, Chief Welfare Officer, South Eastern Postal Region, Post Office.
- Stella Pamela Fairweather, Foreign and Commonwealth Office.
- Jessie Ferguson. For services to the community in Peeblesshire and especially to the Scout Association.
- John Henry Fisher. For services to the Magistracy in Abingdon, Berkshire
- Charles Edward Fitzgerald, lately Clerk, Rayleigh Urban District Council, Essex.
- John Clifford Fletcher, lately County Secretary, East Riding of Yorkshire, County Branch, National Farmers' Union.
- Percy Ernest Leslie Foot, Chairman, Plymouth, Devonport & Cornwall Trustee Savings Bank.
- William Cyril James Fox. For services to the Radcliffe Infirmary, Oxford
- Albert Charles Frost, Higher Executive Officer, Privy Council Office.
- Joseph Percival Garrett. For services to the Scout Association in South Wales.
- Frederick Graham Gash, District Officer (Road Transport), Sussex, Transport and General Workers' Union.
- Elsie May Gilmour, lately Member, Tutbury Rural District Council, Staffordshire.
- Lillian Daureen Goodhall, Member, Teesside Savings Committee.
- The Reverend Patrick John Goodland. For services to the community in Stanmore.
- James Grant, Member, Scottish Agricultural Wages Board.
- James Ralston Grant, lately Commercial Manager, London Airports, Shell-Mex & B.P. Ltd.
- John Edward Campbell Grant, Director and Secretary, Vosper Thornycroft Ltd.
- Frank Charles Green, Supervisor, Experimental Department, Hawker Siddeley Aviation Ltd.
- George William Green, Welding Manager, Swan Hunter (Hebburn) Shipyard.
- Ronald Bennett Green, Manufacturing Facilities Liaison Manager, Derby Engine Division, Rolls-Royce (1971) Ltd.
- Ronald Greer, Systems Manager (Telecommunications) Plessey Telecommunications Research Ltd.
- William James Griffin, Station Manager, Euston, London Midland Region, British Railways Board.
- Freda Gertrude Griffith, lately Secretary, The Swedenborg Society.
- Thomas George Guy, Retail Butcher, Wales. For services to the Meat Trade.
- Sydney Joseph Halford, Professional and Technology Officer Grade 1, Department of the Environment.
- Joseph Edward Hall, Personal Assistant to Managing Director, Pye Unicam Ltd. For services to Export.
- Muriel Olive Juliet Doyle Hall, lately Member Gloucestershire Executive Council.
- Arthur Frank Hand, Commercial Manager, John Maddock & Company Ltd.
- Charles Raymond Hansford, Secretary, English Schools' Cricket Association.
- Herbert Douglas Harris. For services to The Royal Air Forces Association in Scotland.
- Silas Harvey, Drama Adviser, County of Northumberland and North Tyneside Metropolitan District.
- Hannah Hastie, Secretary, Kidsgrove Division, Staffordshire, Soldiers', Sailors' and Airmen's Families Association.
- Doris Lambert Hatfield, Member, Hotel and Catering Economic Development Committee For services to catering.
- Roy Francis Hayman, Director, Confederation of Registered Gas. Installers.
- William Eric Haynes, Charge Nurse, Dermatological Ward, Slade Hospital, Headington, Oxford.
- The Very Reverend George Kennedy Buchanan Henderson, Provost, Fort William.
- James Henderson, Treasurer, Scottish Society for Mentally Handicapped Children.
- John Henry Herbert, Manager, Jersey Airport.
- Grace Hickling, Secretary, Northumberland, Durham and Newcastle upon Tyne Natural History Society.
- Thomas Hannam Hillary. For services to Agriculture.
- Francis Leslie Hogan. For services to journalism in Wales.
- Judith Ann Holder, Foreign and Commonwealth Office.
- Arthur Reginald Howard, Clerical Officer, Department of Employment.
- Leonard Howell, Production Control Manager, Armstrong Patents Company Ltd., Yorkshire.
- Herbert Thomas Hudson, Superintendent of Printing, Metropolitan Police Office.
- Charles Donaghy Hull, Irish Divisional Organiser, Amalgamated Union of Engineering Workers.
- Frank Humphries, lately Higher Executive Officer, Westminster County Court.
- John Edmund Baldwin Jacob, Assistant Chief Engineer (Product Support), Guided Weapons Division, Stevenage, British Aircraft Corporation Ltd.
- Athol Jenkinson, Chairman, Oldham Local Savings Committee.
- Mollie Jervis, Secretary, Headquarters, Sea Cadet Corps.
- Leon Jessel, Managing Director, Leon Jessel Ltd. For services to Export.
- Reginald Frank Johnson, Design and Development Manager, Rose Forgrove Ltd, Gainsborough, Lincolnshire.
- Gordon Macdonald Johnston, Senior Scientific Officer, The Appleton Laboratory, Science Research Council.
- David Mansel Jones, Group Controller for South Wales, United Kingdom Warning and Monitoring Organisation.
- William John Jones, Divisional Officer (South Wales & Western Division), Union of Shop, Distributive and Allied Workers.
- Francis Joyce, lately Senior Probation Officer, Kirkby, Lancashire.
- Alice Kean, Director of Nursing Services, Worcestershire County Council.
- Kathleen Agnes Keast, Member, Launceston Town Council, Cornwall.
- William George Gale Kellett, Director, Rubber Growers' Association.
- Arthur Stanley Kent, Staff Welfare Officer, Crown Agents for Oversea Governments and Administrations.
- Lawrence Kettlewell, Regional Collector, Board of Inland Revenue.
- Alison Gordon Kiddie, Ward Sister, Ophthalmic Ward, Dundee Royal Infirmary.
- Freeman Atkinson Kiddle, Central Planning Engineer, Redpath Dorman Long Ltd., Manufacturing Division, Scunthorpe Blanch, British Steel Corporation.
- Stanley Neil King, Area Works Officer, North West Europe Area, Commonwealth War Graves Commission.
- William Foord King. For services to Nursing and to the community in Kent.
- Leslie Frank Kingston, General Secretary, Ileostomy Association of Great Britain and Ireland.
- Allan Kirk, Executive Officer, Department of the Environment.
- John William Knowles, Chairman, East Riding (Southern Area) Youth Employment Committee.
- Raymond Lamb, Warden, Walthamstow Adult Education Centre and Secretary, The Educational Centres Association.
- Peter Large, Chairman, Joint Committee on Mobility for the Disabled.
- Wendy Leech, President, British Dental Hygienists' Association.
- Gordon Lennox, Area Pharmaceutical Officer, West Glamorgan Area Health Authority.
- Hilda May Lettice, lately Alderman, Worcester City Council.
- Maurice Levi, lately Export Director, James Drummond & Sons Ltd For services to Export.
- Thomas Adam Lewis, Depute Firemaster, Fife Fire Brigade.
- June Maureen Light, Personal Secretary, Ministry of Defence.
- Kathleen Edith Lloyd, lately Assistant to the Controller, and Secretary, Soldiers' Sailors' and Airmen's Families Association.
- Irene Margaret Logan, Chairman, East Kilbride Street Group Savings Sub-Committee.
- Gilbert Eric Edward Lyon, lately Town Clerk, Whitehaven Borough Council.
- Joseph Alexander McBain, Regional Commercial Manager, Cumbria Region, English Industrial Estates Corporation.
- Jeremiah Gerard McCarthy, Clerical Officer, Department of Health and Social Security.
- Peveril Elizabeth Morton McClements, lately Superintendent, Royal Ulster Constabulary.
- Agnes Lorraine McCulloch, Head Teacher, St. Laurence's Primary School, Birkenhead.
- Donald Archibald Macdonald, Steward, Class I, HM Prison, Barlinnie, Glasgow.
- Samuel Reid McGaughey, Deputy Principal, Department of the Environment, Northern Ireland.
- George McIntosh, Superintendent, Conon District Salmon Fishery Board.
- Murdo MacIver, District Manager, for Western Isles, North of Scotland Hydro Electric Board.
- Florence Elizabeth McKenzie, lately Ward Sister, Plastic Surgery and Maxillo-Facial Unit, Ulster Hospital, Dundonald, Belfast.
- Precious Patrick McKenzie. For services to weight-lifting.
- Elsie McLachlan, lately Ward Sister, Dunfermline Maternity Hospital.
- Janet Margaret Catriona McMillan, Senior Nursing Officer, Cowglen Hospital, Glasgow.
- William McNeill, Captain, Glasgow Celtic Football Club.
- Gerald Stewart Mahon, Chief Superintendent, Royal Ulster Constabulary.
- Walter William Mannings, Professional and Technology Officer Grade 1, Department of the Environment.
- William George Maple, lately Mess Steward, Cabinet Office.
- Peter Stephen Marshall. For services to Sino-British Trade Relations.
- William Robert Bruce Mason, lately Chief Work Study Officer, Northamptonshire County Council.
- Ernest John Rooke-Matthews, lately Area Supplies Officer, Southampton University Hospital Management Committee.
- Frank Courtenay Matthews, Valuer (Main Grade), Board of Inland Revenue.
- Nellie Louise Matthews. For services to handicapped children and to the Guide movement in Hampshire.
- Thomas Paul Watson Matthews, Managing Director, Charlton Weddle and Company Ltd, Newcastle upon Tyne. For services to Export.
- John Bertram Maylam, DFC, Director, Customer Service and Conversion, Eastern Region, British Gas Corporation.
- Matthew Maynes, Principal Nursing Officer, Purdysburn Hospital, Belfast.
- Joseph Noel Meinertzhagen, Foreign and Commonwealth Office.
- Kenneth Charles Llewellyn Mettyear, Professor of Music, Royal Marines School of Music, Deal, Ministry of Defence.
- Scowen Crawford Mogg, Chief Superintendent, West Yorkshire Metropolitan Police.
- Hilda Rose Mokes, Secretary, League of Friends of Worksop Hospitals, Nottinghamshire.
- John Stanfield Moore, Partner, George Watson and Company Ltd., Belfast.
- William Moore, Superintendent (Grade II), Ministry of Defence Police.
- Henry Stafford Moreton, lately Member, West Lancashire Rural District Council.
- Geoffrey Morgan, Higher Executive Officer, Department of Employment.
- Winifred Phyllis Morgan, lately Principal Staff Officer, Woolwich Group Hospital Management Committee.
- Francis Herbert Morris, Professional and Technology Officer Grade 1, Department of Health and Social Security.
- Stanley Charlton Morse, Inspector of Taxes (Higher Grade), Board of Inland Revenue.
- Jane Gertrude Murphy, Chairman, Belfast Housing Aid Society.
- Philip Walton Musther, lately Clerk, Chadderton Urban District Council, Cheshire.
- Percival Douglas Nash, Executive Officer, Department of Health and Social Security.
- John Richard Neaves, Foreign and Commonwealth Office.
- George Alonzo Neilson, General Manager, South-West Wales Trustee Savings Bank.
- William Henry Newman, lately Member, Devon River Authority.
- Arthur James O'Friel, Chairman, Ellesmere Port Disablement Advisory Committee.
- Cecil Kirsopp Oliphant, Secretary, The Liverpool Steam Ship Owners' Association.
- Muriel Hayes Overton. For services to the Royal British Legion.
- Jack Leslie Owen, Civilian Chef Instructor Grade I, Ministry of Defence.
- Ernest Blain Parke, Underwriting member, Lloyd's.
- Thomas Ernest Beckwith Parkinson, Assistant Shift Charge Engineer, Warrington Power Station, Central Electricity Generating Board.
- Sidney Frederick Parnell, Senior Executive Officer, Ministry of Defence.
- William Thomas Brookes-Parry, lately Clerk to Aled Rural District Council, Flintshire.
- William John Howell Paton. For services to the Spastics Association in South Wales.
- Thomas Richardson Paxton, Senior Executive Officer, Royal Ordnance Factory, Birtley, Ministry of Defence.
- Ernest George Pearce, Deputy Assistant Chief Fire Officer, London Fire Brigade.
- Hilda Anne Phillips, lately County Organiser, Cornwall, Hospital Car Service.
- Mair Eluned Pinnell, Member, Yorkshire and North East Conciliation Committee, Race Relations Board.
- Frederick Charles Ponsford, Deputy Chief Fire Officer, Avon Fire Brigade.
- Florence Fyffe Porter, lately Staff Officer, Department of Finance, Northern Ireland.
- Hugh Kenneth Merrett Poyntz. For services to The Officers' Association.
- Thomas George Prince, lately Member, Ashbourne Rural District Council, Derbyshire.
- Norman Francis Pugsley, Headmaster, Sandy Lane County Junior School, Bracknell, Berkshire.
- Alec George Pyman, Head, Forestry Department, Cumbria College of Agriculture and Forestry.
- William Daniel Ralph, Consultant Engineer, Stanmore, Marconi Space and Defence Systems Ltd.
- Richard Sutton Ransom, Chief Designer, Missile Systems Division, Short Brothers & Harland Ltd.
- Catherine Easton Renfrew, Chairman, College of Speech Therapists.
- Eira Richards, Member, Welsh Boaid, Royal College of Nursing.
- Susan Richards, Senior Executive Officer, Department of Health and Social Security.
- Monica Rimmer, Ward Sister, Gynaecological Ward, Whiston Hospital, Lancashire.
- Hugh Francis Robinson, Deputy Environmental Health Manager, Salford City Council.
- Norman Henry Rogers. For services to the Institute of Public Relations.
- Norman William Rolfe, lately Secretary, Midland Red Omnibus Company Ltd.
- Florence Lydia Rowden, Head of Registry, Headquarters, Women's Royal Voluntary Service'.
- Arthur Anthony Roy, Senior Executive Officer, Department of Employment.
- David Russell, Principal, Finiston Primary School, Belfast.
- Margaret Kitty Sack, Office and Staff Administrator, The National Trust.
- Harry Brimelow Sales, lately Town Clerk, Aldershot Borough Council.
- Janet Anne Sawbridge. For services to Ice Dancing.
- Charles William Sax, lately Chairman, Letchworth Urban District Council.
- Elizabeth Cecily Mease Sewell, County Organiser, Hertfordshire, Women's Royal Voluntary Service.
- Mary Shalvey, lately Ward Sister, Winwick Hospital, Warrington, Lancashire.
- Mary Shaw, Chef, Inverlochy Castle Hotel, Fort William, Inverness-shire.
- Lilah Shelton, Centre Leader, Church Army Centre, Hameln, British Army of the Rhine.
- John William Sillience, Higher Executive Officer, Board of Inland Revenue.
- Wilfrid Thomas Simmonds. For services to the community in Morayshire.
- Joan Attwood Smedley, lately Member, Ashby-de-la-Zouch Urban District Council.
- James Morgan Smith, lately Chairman, Newent Rural District Council, Gloucestershire.
- Phyllis Jane Smith, lately Nursing Administrative Sister, St. Mary's Hospital, Etchinshill, Kent.
- Thomas Edward Smith, General Secretary, Association of Cricket Umpires.
- Thomas James Smith, Provost of Peterhead.
- John James Smyth, County Secretary, County Antrim Savings Committee, Northern Ireland.
- Roy Souter, lately Master, MSV Succour, Ministry of Defence.
- John Philip Spink, Chairman, Salford, Eccles and District War Pensions Committee.
- Michael Squire Squire. For services to the Magistracy in Barnstaple, Devon.
- Lieutenant-Commander Albert Edwin Stanton, Royal Naval Reserve. For services to youth in St. Helens and district.
- Wilfred Christopher Steele, lately Principal Medical Laboratory Technician, Royal Free Hospital, London.
- Kenneth Bertram Steley, Higher Executive Officer, Department of Employment.
- Jean Stirling, lately Director of Nursing Services, Belfast.
- Mary Stops, Secretary to the Commandant, Star and Garter Home for Disabled Sailors, Soldiers and Airmen, Richmond upon Thames.
- Kathleen Nancy Liddle Stout, lately Member, Special Area Committee, Cumberland.
- Joyce Mary Stratford, Clerical Officer, Department of Energy.
- Stanley Sutcliffe, Executive Manager, Paddington, Broad & Company Ltd., Builders' Merchants.
- James Anderson Swanwick, Chairman, Nottingham Local Savings Committee.
- Robert Charles Taylor, Officer, Board of Customs and Excise.
- William David Thomas. For services to agricultural journalism.
- George William Thompson, Sales Manager, Traffic Signals, Plessey Company Ltd. For services to Export.
- Jack Allan Thorn, lately Chairman, Southern Region Education Committee, National Savings Committee.
- Captain Leonard William Thorne, Commodore Master, MV Weybank, Andrew Weir & Company Ltd.
- John Henry Raymond Trape, Chief Superintendent, Metropolitan Police.
- Arthur Reginald Tredinnick, Prison Welfare Officer, HM Prison, Wandsworth.
- Anthony Philip Allan Tucker, lately Area Welfare Officer, Wiltshire County Council.
- John Frederick Tucker, Senior Scientific Officer, Hough ton Poultry Research Station, Huntingdon.
- Ronald John Tunnicliff, Senior Executive Officer, Science Research Council.
- Agnes Elizabeth Turner, lately Principal Medical Social Worker, Oxford Hospitals Board.
- Jane Bell Turner, Principal Social Worker, Motherwell and Wishaw Town Council.
- Ivor Armentieres Tyler, Inspector of Taxes (Higher Grade), Board of Inland Revenue.
- Henry Thomas Valentine, lately Foreign and Commonwealth Office.
- John Waite, Chief Project Designer, Preston, British Aircraft Corporation Ltd.
- Leonard Charles Walklett. For services to the community in Banbury and district, Oxfordshire.
- Jack Thomson Walmsley, Surveyor, Board of Customs and Excise.
- Kenneth Aykroyd Walmsley, Chairman, No. 1051 (Dartford) Squadron, Air Training Corps.
- Alfred George Wanklin, Administrative Officer, Communications and Planning Department, West Midlands Police.
- Thomas Edward Watkins, National Case Secretary and Rehabilitation Officer, The Forces Help Society and Lord Roberts Workshops.
- Kaye Webb (Kathleen Searle), Managing Director, Children's Division, Penguin Books Ltd.
- Harold Webster, Headmaster, Hunderton Junior School, Hereford.
- Leslie Welch, lately Executive Officer, Ministry of Defence.
- James West, Senior Executive Officer, Home Office.
- Harry Weston. For services to the community in Coventry.
- Athole Whayman, MM, District (Forest) Officer, Forestry Commission (Scotland).
- Ronald Whelan, Foreign and Commonwealth Office
- Sidney Hilton Whitaker, lately Senior Assistant Education Officer, Lancashire County Council.
- Terence Ernest Whiteside, Secretary, British Cast Iron Research Association.
- Donald Francis Henry Wilding, Chief Superintendent, Gwent Constabulary.
- David Andrew Wilkie. For services to swimming.
- Marion Darroch Wilkie, Depute Clerk of the Peace for the County of the City of Glasgow and for the County of Lanarkshire.
- John Henry Wilkinson, lately Deputy Director (Mining), Staffordshire Area, National Coal Board.
- Albert Edward Williams, Senior Regional Accountant, Navy, Army and Air Force Institutes.
- Alfred Harold Bertram Williams, Chief Superintendent, Metropolitan Police.
- Charles Thomas Williams, Smallholder, Gloucestershire. For services to the Land Settlement Association.
- Major Noel Salusbury Watkin-Williams, Producer, Colchester Tattoo.
- William John Williams, lately Chief Nursing Officer, Leavesden Group Hospital Management Committee.
- Joan Leslie Willink, lately County Organiser, Westmorland, Women's Royal Voluntary Service.
- Arthur Charles George Wiltshire, Senior Executive Officer, Department of Education and Science.
- Eric Roy Winters, Artist and Architect.
- Wyndham David Winters. For services to paraplegic sports particularly in Wales.
- Fred Wood, lately Member, West Riding of Yorkshire Executive Council.
- Rhys Lloyd Woodland, Press Officer, Hampshire County Council.
- John Robin Marcel Woolf, Administrator, Society for the Promotion of New Music, and Chairman, Park Lane Group.
- Margaret Ann Woollatt, Superintendent of Typists, Materials Quality Assurance Directorate, Woolwich, Ministry of Defence.
- Katharine Jean Digby-Worsley, lately Head, External Broadcasting Audience Research, British Broadcasting Corporation.
- Shelagh Frances Wright, Assistant Private Secretary, Prime Minister's Office.
- Spencer John Wright, BEM, Higher Executive Officer, Department of Health and Social Security.
- Ronald George Yeats. For services to The Save the Children Fund.

Diplomatic Service and Overseas List

- Conrad Alexander Adams. For services to the community in St. Vincent.
- Derrick Ah-Lock, Registrar, Supreme Court, Seychelles.
- Daniel Cullimore Ainsworth. For services to British commercial interests in Montreal.
- Frederic John Ainsworth. For services to education in Kenya.
- Brian Arthur Allen. For services to education in Iran and Anglo-Iranian relations.
- John Rodrigues Anjo. For services to the community in Antigua.
- Charlotte Lobban Singer Anstruther. For services to Anglo-Argentine relations.
- Elizabeth Baker. For services to the community in Sri Lanka (Ceylon).
- Marie Adrian Pamela Baptiste. For services to nursing in St. Lucia.
- Vera Jane Barnes. For welfare services to children in Jordan.
- Peter Beck, Medical Superintendent, Central Hospital, British Solomon Islands Protectorate.
- Charles Henry Bell, CPM, Assistant Commissioner, Swaziland Police.
- Isobel Mary Benson, Personal Assistant to Commercial Counsellor, HM Embassy, Washington.
- Peter Anthony Bergasse. For services to the community in St. Lucia.
- Joseph Nathaniel Best, Deputy Warden, Prison Service, Bermuda.
- Dennis Stevens Bignall, Immigration Officer, British High Commission, Accra.
- Maurice Kersley Blain. For services to British Commercial interests in Iran.
- Florence Marjorie Booth. Visitor Arrangements Officer, HM Embassy, Washington.
- Rosa Maria Brazier. For services to the British community in Argentina.
- Leslie Robert Broom. For services to the British community in Sweden.
- Arthur Sanderson Brown, lately First Secretary (Immigration), HM Embassy, Islamabad.
- Clive Henderson Wingate Burgess. For services to sport in Bermuda.
- Ian Thomas Campbell. Pilot, Government Air Service, Falkland Islands.
- Herbert Henry Cleak, Vice-Consul (Administration), HM Consulate-General, Karachi.
- Sarah Jones Black Clements, Private Secretary, Government House, Falkland Islands.
- Donald Ralph Cobb. For services to agricultural development in Swaziland.
- Agnes Eleanor Cobham. For services to education in Uruguay.
- Constantine Coliandris, Consular Clerk, HM Embassy, Athens.
- The Reverend Alfred Walter Heath Cooke. For services to the Church and the British community in Tripoli.
- Suzanne Maria Elizabeth Coorevits. For services to nursing in Dominica.
- Barbara Phyllis Davies, Accommodation Officer, British High Commission, Canberra.
- John Frederick Davis. For services to British commercial interests in Belgium.
- Alan Davison. Commissioner of Prisons, Government of Malawi.
- Hanmer York Warrington Soud Dickson, Under-secretary, Ministry of Health, Malawi.
- Frank Victor Dobson. For services to British interests in Mendoza, Argentina.
- George Bernard Doggett, lately Administration Officer, British Trade Commission, Hong Kong.
- Major Gerald Foster Doggett, MC, Medical Defence Staff Officer, Auxiliary Medical Service, Hong Kong.
- Jennifer Glen Down, Women's Interests Officer, Social Welfare Department, British Solomon Islands Protectorate.
- Douglas Arthur Earp. For services to the planting industry in Malaysia.
- Richard William Fiddes, Executive Secretary, Certificate of Education Examination Board, Malawi.
- Fung Hak-ming, Engineer, Cable & Wireless Limited, Hong Kong.
- Sheila Mavis Gabain. For welfare services to the community in Singapore.
- George Seymour Gabb. For services to art in Belize
- Harold Ashford Garling. For services to the community in The Gambia.
- Patricia Ann Gibson, lately Personal Assistant, HM Embassy, Rangoon.
- Hope Dorothy Ethelyn Glidden-Borden, Postmaster, Cayman Islands.
- Helen Gretta Kathleen Goodwin. For services to the community in Antigua.
- Berta Angelica Crimson. Assistant Information Officer, HM Embassy, Buenos Aires.
- Joan Margaret Guth. For services to Anglo-American relations in New York.
- Elizabeth Hobday, lately Veterinary Officer, Government of Botswana.
- Patricia Anne Hollamby. For nursing services to the community in Botswana.
- The Reverend Peter Innes. For services to the British community in Assam.
- Charles Hubert James. For services to the community in the Turks and Caicos Islands.
- Laura Johnson. For services to the British community in Alexandria.
- Joseph Reginald Jordan. For welfare services to the community in Bombay.
- Donald King. For services to Anglo-Canadian relations in the field of sport.
- Joseph Lablache, Senior Assistant Education Officer, Seychelles.
- Hilary Dawn La Fontaine, lately Personal Assistant, British High Commission, Blantyre.
- Patricia Lee. For services to the British community in Malaysia.
- Roy Charles Lee, Honorary British Vice-Consul, Funchal, Madeira.
- Amy Bryan Leslie. For services to the community in Belize.
- Leung Hon-ming. Superintendent, Urban Services Department, Hong Kong.
- Francis Xavier Loo Khim-leng. For services to the community in Hong Kong.
- Mary Johan McCallum, Personal Assistant to External Trade Counsellor, United Kingdom Mission to the EEC, Brussels.
- William John MacDonald, Highways Superintendent, Hong Kong.
- Inger Margaret La Roche McLennan. For services to Anglo-American relations in Hawaii.
- Theophilus Milton Mayers. For services to the community in St. Vincent.
- Mohamed Mokdad. Locally Engaged Officer Grade I, HM Embassy, Beirut.
- Robert Gordon Moller. For services to the British community in Antwerp.
- Martyn Richard Price Naylor. For services to Anglo-Japanese relations.
- John O'Donnell, Deputy Superintendent of Police, Singapore Police Force.
- John Lawrence Pepys-Cockerell. Senior Assistant Secretary, Natural Resources Department, British Solomon Islands Protectorate.
- Maruja Posso. For welfare services to the community in Gibraltar.
- John Herbert Potter, lately First Secretary (Administration) HM Embassy, Brussels.
- Dorothy Gertrude Prejger. For services to Anglo-French relations in Cannes.
- Margaret Jean Raj, Personal Assistant to Education Adviser, British High Commission, New Delhi.
- Jamil Ramadan, Vice-Consul, HM Embassy, Beirut.
- Norman Victor Revell, lately grade 8 Officer, HM Embassy, Addis Ababa.
- Arthur Patrick Richardson. Deputy Director of Urban Services, Hong Kong.
- Mary Clotilda Robinson. For services to education in the Turks and Caicos Islands.
- George Ross. For services to the British community in Brussels and to Anglo-Belgian relations.
- Sheila Sybil Sack. Locally Engaged Grade I Officer, Information Section, HM Embassy, Brussels.
- Ann Campbell Sampson. For nursing services to the community in Kenya.
- Edna Mae Scott. For services to education in Bermuda.
- Geoffrey Ernest Goldbale Seagoe. For public services in the Condominium of the New Hebrides.
- Kenneth Charles Searle. For services to ornithology in Hong Kong.
- Ellinor Catherine Cunningham van Someren, lately Laboratory Assistant, Kenya Government Health Service.
- The Reverend Kenneth Ernest Stovold. For services to the Church and the community in Kenya.
- Geoffrey Michael Tabor. For services to banking and the British community in Lesotho.
- Ronald Frederick Tidy. Lately Second Secretary, British Deputy High Commission, Bombay.
- James Joseph Tipping, lately Chief Public Health Inspector, Gibraltar.
- Dora Louisa Udale. For services to the community in Isfahan, Iran.
- Florence Videmyr. For services to the British community in Stockholm.
- Frederick Weatherley, MC. For services to the British community in Penang, Malaysia.
- Rosemary Alberta Weston. For nursing services to the community in Afghanistan.
- Ralph Walter Beal Whillier. Provincial Engineer, Bauchi, North Eastern State, Nigeria.
- The Reverend John Williamson. For services to the Church and Anglo-Dutch relations in Amsterdam.
- Dorothy Helen Willson. Personal Secretary, Cabinet Office, Lesotho.
- Margaret Mary Wilson. Personal Assistant to the Attorney General, Hong Kong.
- Yeung So-min. For services to education in Hong Kong.
- Stephen Zolas. Pro-Consul, HM Consulate, Salonika.

Australian States

State of New South Wales

- Moya Hilda Arkins. For services to the community.
- Gladys Thelma Arlom. For services to the community.
- Arthur Rushmere Baldwin. For services to sport.
- Sidney Edgar Barratt. For services to industry.
- Douglas Kent Braddock. For services to sport.
- James Henry Brooks. For services to ex-Servicemen and the community.
- Percy Norman Cape Well. For services to the State.
- Susan Angus Crofts. For services to the community.
- Margaret Elizabeth Davenport. For services to the community.
- Ian Dixon. For services to medicine.
- Rowland Albert Dunbier. For services to the community.
- Allan Frederick Dwyer. For services to medicine.
- Margaret Beresford Fell. For services to the community.
- May Fowler. For services to the community.
- Nora Florence Gaunson. For services to the community.
- Henry Bannerman Hamilton. For services to the community.
- James Wilson Hogg. For services to education.
- Ralph Holroyd. For services to the community.
- Anthony Hordern. For services to primary industry.
- Edward Alan Hunt. For services to the community.
- Walter Kingsley. For services to music.
- Henry Attwool Dunbar Mitchell. For services to the community.
- Noel George Morris. For services to the community.
- Ronald Macdonald Murray, Band Master, Scots College.
- Isaac Richard Norman. For services to the community.
- Shirley Anne O'Shea. For services to the community.
- Roger Frederick Pegram. For services to sport.
- John Rex Phillipps. For services to the community.
- Lawrence George Pincott. For services to the State.
- John Thomas Purcell. For services to the State.
- Patrick Francis Joseph Quan. For services to the community.
- The Reverend Brother Clyde Cameron Redford (Reverend Brother Demetrius). For services to education.
- Regina Ridge. For services to music.
- Councillor Ralph Arthur Whitfield. For services to local government.

State of Victoria

- Angus Edward Anderson, DCM, JP, of Koroit. For services to the community.
- Ronald Thomas Beer, Chief Property Officer for Victoria.
- Councillor Ronald Pendock Bingley, of Rokewood. For services to local government and the community.
- Raelene Ann Boyle, of Hampton. For services to sport.
- Robert Clarence Bull, of Metung. For services to the community.
- Colin Bernard Campbell, of South Oakleigh. For services to the community.
- Councillor Robert Lindsay Campbell, JP, of Bendigo. For services to the community.
- Councillor John Clancy, JP, of Kilmore. For services in local government and to the community.
- Elsie Mary Dabb, JP, of Highton. For services to the community.
- Councillor Maxwell Walter Eise, JP, of Brighton. For services to the community and local government.
- Councillor James Percival Esslemont, JP, of Pascoe Vale South, for services to local government and the community.
- Joyce Evelyn Fleming, JP, of Glenhuntly. For community activities, with particular reference to the welfare of pensioners.
- Stanley Thomas Glassborow, of South Caulfield. For services to the community.
- Kathleen Maie Gregory, lately Director, Forest Hill Residential Kindergarten.
- Councillor Gordon Kenneth Harrison, of Swan Hill. For services to local government and the community.
- Roy Henry Higgins, of Cheltenham. For services to the sport of racing as a jockey.
- Lieutenant-Colonel Walter Stace Howden, DSO, ED, of Caulfield South. For services to ex-Service men.
- The Reverend Ephraim Kowadlo, of Elwood. For services to the Jewish community.
- Godfrey William Letts, of Donald. For services to journalism.
- William Horace Myers, JP, of Highton. For services as a municipal administrator and to the community.
- Councillor Alan Robert Patterson, JP, of North Balwyn. For services in local government and to the community.
- Reynold Theodore Redenbach, of Lakes Entrance. For services in local government and to the community.
- Beryl Juliet Rowley, of North Caulfield. For services to the community.
- Kathleen Sloane, East Malvern. For services to the community.
- Keith Raymond Stackpole, of Ivanhoe. For services to cricket.
- George Henry Taylor, of Doncaster. For services for the welfare of the physically handicapped.
- Councillor Walter Harry Tew, JP, of Ferntree Gully. For services in local government and to the community.
- Stuart James Crockett Wilkie, of Ivanhoe. For services to music.

State of Queensland

- Councillor Onslow Rutherford Andrews, of Newell. For services to local government and the community.
- Alexander James Burke, of Chelmer. For his dedication to the celebration of Australia Day.
- Archibald John Shepherdson Day, of Paddington. For services as organist and choirmaster for over 40 years.
- Gertrude Annie Gralow, of Theodore. For services to the community.
- Hector McKenna Hunter, of Hughenden. For services to local government and the community.
- Arthur Charles Thomas Keller, of Cairns. For (services to the community.
- Louisa Toogood, of Brisbane. For her services to the poor and destitute.
- William Waddell, of Toombul. For services to association football.
- Malcolm Ormsby White, of Main Beach. For his meritorious and courageous maritime services.

State of Western Australia

- John Laurence Nevill, JP, of Yalgoo. For services to local government.
- Victor Gregory Rowe, of Claremont. For services to the community and the Red Cross.

=== Order of the Companions of Honour (CH) ===
- David Jones, CBE. Artist.
- The Reverend Nathaniel Micklem. For services to Theology.

=== Companion of the Imperial Service Order (ISO) ===
Home Civil Service

- Ernest William Bentley, lately Senior Principal Scientific Officer, Ministry of Agriculture, Fisheries and Food.
- Arthur Duckworth, Principal Professional and Technology Officer, Royal Ordnance Factory, Blackburn, Ministry of Defence.
- Vyvyan George Ellen, Principal Collector of Taxes, Board of Inland Revenue.
- Frank Harry Evans, lately Principal Scientific Officer, Admiralty Underwater Weapons Establishment, Ministry of Defence.
- Leonard George Gibbs, ERD, Principal, Department of Education and Science.
- Robert Cameron Haddow, lately Principal Professional and Technology Officer, Department of the Environment.
- Hubert Halliley, Principal, Department of the Environment.
- Jean Marjorie Hayes, Principal, Ministry of Defence.
- Eric Wilson Hewitt, Principal, Department of Health and Social Security.
- George Arthur Higgens, Superintending Valuer, Board of Inland Revenue.
- Joan Ula Kilsby, Principal, Export Credits Guarantee Department.
- Arthur John Mills, Senior Principal, Patent Office.
- Reginald Walter James Mitchell, Principal, Department of the Environment.
- Donald Eaton Murray, Assistant Director/Engineer, Aircraft Equipment Production (B), Ministry of Defence.
- William Denis Naish, Senior Principal, Ministry of Defence.
- James Ormerod, lately Principal, Home Office.
- Arthur Sydney Powis, Principal, HM Stationery Office.
- Harold Charles Shellard, Principal Scientific Officer, Ministry of Defence.
- Arthur James Stroud, Senior Principal, Department of Trade.
- William John Tasker, Senior Inspector, Board of Customs and Excise.
- The Reverend George Charles William Twyman, lately Superintending Estate Surveyor, Department of the Environment.
- Alan Theophilus Warrell, Principal, Department of Health and Social Security.
- Wilfrid Bentham White, Superintending Valuer, Department of Finance, Northern Ireland.
- Ronald Alfred George Whiteman, Assistant Master, Court of Protection.

Diplomatic Service and Overseas List

- Chow Nai-yeung, formerly Controller of Chinese Programmes, Radio Hong Kong.
- John Henry Knapp, Superintendent of Mines, Hong Kong.
- Robert Kwok Cheung, Senior Fisheries Officer, Hong Kong.
- Henry Urquhart, Director of Education, Gilbert and Ellice Islands Colony.

Australian States

State of New South Wales

- Thomas Joseph Crawford, MBE, ED, Assistant Ceremonial Officer in the Premier's Department.
- Russell Edgar Garbutt, lately Commissioner of Land Tax.
- Roy Mervyn Watts, Director-General, Department of Agriculture.

State of Victoria

- Robert Allan Horsfall, MBE, formerly Commissioner of Water Supply, State Rivers and Water Supply Commission.

State of Queensland

- James Meiklejohn Harvey, Director-General, Department of Primary Industries.

=== British Empire Medal (BEM) ===
Military Division

Royal Navy

- Chief Petty Officer Stores Accountant William Harold Batstone, MO52773N.
- Sergeant Lawrence Yule Bell, Royal Marines, P018344G.
- Chief Petty Officer Coxswain Hollis Cecil Bodle, J155722W.
- Chief Control Electrical Artificer (L) John Mark Cornel, M833439N.
- Chief Petty Officer Physical Trainer 1 Stanley Craven, J890121G.
- Regulating Chief Wren Muriel Bessie Cridge, W111827H.
- Chief Petty Officer Physical Trainer 1 Thomas Pearden, J839723C.
- Chief Petty Officer Coxswain Brian Orlando Densley, J960179J.
- Marine William Trevor Gallie, Royal Marines, P016838H.
- Electrical Mechanician (Air) 1 John Eric Green, L/F956158.
- Colour Sergeant (CS) Thomas Wilson Grieves, Royal Marines, S004533E.
- Leading Radio Operator (RNR) Richard Brian Hapgood, Q027575.
- Chief Petty Officer Medical Assistant Edmund Joseph Roland Harrison, D918321A.
- Acting Petty Officer Medical Assistant Christopher Edward James, D088818H.
- Musician Michael Jennings, Royal Marines, Q002596X.
- Chief Petty Officer Writer Leslie Norman Joyce, M058737B.
- Chief Petty Officer Cook Leslie Arthur Lea, M854202V.
- Chief Radio Supervisor Michael John Lovell, J920132S.
- Chief Petty Officer Coxswain Victor Grant Merry, J182106U.
- Chief Ordnance Electrician Noel James Newton, M980979R.
- Chief Ordnance Electrician (RNR) Ivor Francis Nutt, V994763.
- Acting Corporal Harry Oxford, Royal Marines, R006671B.
- Chief Marine Engineering Artificer (H) Alfred John Patten, M802749E.
- Regulating Petty Officer David Richardson, D050563P.
- Chief Radio Electrician Brian Edward Speight, M979145G.
- Chief Ordnance Electrician Winfred Stevenson, MX828018.
- Radio Mechanician 1 John David Sunderland, M093755X.
- Marine Engineering Artificer (P) 1 Humphrey Stephan Waddington, M956479.
- Chief Petty Officer Cook Roy Wilson, M924712Q.

Army

- 22135919 Sergeant Douglas Charles Baker, The Royal Regiment of Wales (24th/41st Foot).
- 23825713 Sergeant Albert Roy Barber, Royal Corps of Transport.
- 23525008 Staff Sergeant Leonard Charles Bean, Corps of Royal Electrical and Mechanical Engineers.
- 22280554 Sergeant Charles William Bird, Royal Corps of Transport.
- W/433900 Corporal Janice Carol Black, Women's, Royal Army Corps.
- 22637286 Staff Sergeant William Boyd, Royal Corps, of Transport.
- 22300180 Sergeant (Local Warrant Officer Class 2) John Lester Brogan, Royal Regiment of Artillery, now discharged.
- 23902161 Staff Sergeant Michael Anthony Buckley, Corps of Royal Engineers.
- 23897140 Sergeant Rodney Charles Bush, Royal Army Ordnance Corps.
- 22772552 Sergeant (Acting Staff Sergeant) Peter Leslie Colling, Corps of Royal Engineers.
- 22530998 Staff Sergeant (Acting Warrant Officer Class 2) David Denness, Grenadier Guards.
- 22356932 Sergeant Keith Dickinson, Royal Corps of Transport.
- 23924747 Staff Sergeant James Alfred Donoghue, The Royal Green Jackets.
- 6013005 Sergeant (Acting Staff Sergeant) Thomas Henry Fitch, The Parachute Regiment.
- 22188518 Staff Sergeant Derek William Gibson, Royal Regiment of Artillery.
- 22264563 Sergeant (Local Staff Sergeant) Samuel Hannell, The Royal Highland Fusiliers (Princess Margaret's Own Glasgow and Ayrshire Regiment).
- 21152467 Corporal Harising Gurung, Gurkha Engineers.
- 22834468 Sergeant Sidney Idanov, Liverpool University, Officer Training Corps.
- W/423481 Sergeant Janet Malley, Women's Royal Army Corps.
- 23651316 Corporal (Acting Sergeant) Samuel McAllister, The Royal Irish Rangers (27th (Inniskilling) 83rd and 87th).
- 23996406 Staff Sergeant Robert Scott McCrindle, Intelligence Corps.
- 23736063 Sergeant David Medcalf, Royal Corps of Transport.
- 22806495 Sergeant (Acting Staff Sergeant) Wiliam Millington, Corps of Royal Engineers, now discharged.
- 22090744 Sergeant (Acting Staff Sergeant) Robert McLean, The Royal Highland Fusiliers (Priricess Margaret's Own Glasgow and Ayrshire Regiment).
- 23661955 Sergeant (Acting Staff Sergeant) Allan Hugh McLelland, The Black Watch (Royal Highland Regiment).
- 24100915 Staff Sergeant Robert George Moggridge, Corps of Royal Electrical and Mechanical Engineers.
- 22519796 Staff Sergeant William Motion, Royal Regiment of Artillery.
- 23900340 Staff Sergeant Costa Nicholas Mario Pattas, Intelligence Corps.
- 24025278 Corporal Lawrence Jones Rich, Royal Army Ordnance Corps.
- LS/22812738 Staff Sergeant (Local Warrant Officer Class 2) William Patrick Stewart, Royal Army Ordnance Corps.
- 22214318 Sergeant Norman Hedley Tout, The Wessex Regiment (Rifle Volunteers) Territorial and Army Volunteer Reserve.
- 23921991 Sergeant Gert George Trytsman, Royal Army Ordnance Corps.
- 23733959 Staff Sergeant (Acting Warrant Officer Class 2) Allen George Turner, Royal Corps of Signals.
- 22490264 Sergeant Thomas Wright, Scots Guards.

Royal Air Force

- Acting Warrant Officer Leslie John Booker (U0585120).
- Acting Warrant Officer David Buley (V0592943).
- Acting Warrant Officer Patrick Joseph Watson (A4009258).
- D0583411 Flight Sergeant Alan Malcolm Gibbens.
- U3120674 Flight Sergeant Anthony James Gillham, Royal Auxiliary Air Force.
- W4087451 Flight Sergeant Alan Ward Glover.
- P0583786 Flight Sergeant Clive Hardwick.
- Y4010830 Flight Sergeant Dennis Malcolm Hillier.
- M4008637 Flight Sergeant Joseph Norman Hoffman.
- L4164653 Flight Sergeant Peter Stewart McKechnie.
- T4115529 Flight Sergeant Dennis Shepherd.
- R1921423 Flight Sergeant Roy George Thomas.
- A4135892 Acting Flight Sergeant William Pow McLeod.
- A4055847 Acting Flight Sergeant Peter Jack Regan.
- C0585492 Chief Technician Brian Stewart Adam.
- U0586718 Chief Technician Raymond Joseph Burridge.
- T4192505 Chief Technician Joseph McKenna Cairns.
- X4003490 Chief Technician Albert Cecil Davis.
- B4001580 Chief Technician Edward Routledge Forster.
- S1920079 Chief Technician Michael William Newson.
- U0577581 Chief Technician Herbert Thomas Parker.
- C4181051 Chief Technician Michael Welham Patrick Smith.
- A0585044 Chief Technician John Howard Taverner.
- R4132950 Chief Technician Graham Romford Thomas.
- X0587188 Chief Technician John Trotter.
- T1928972 Chief Technician Michael Ernest Turner.
- Q4178327 Sergeant Philip Anthony Jones.
- S8082020 Sergeant David Watt McLeod.
- X4146528 Sergeant Geoffrey Raymond Vincent.
- A4121347 Sergeant Thomas David Weatherall.
- VS069248 Sergeant James Ian Young.
- U0593652 Acting Sergeant Leonard Cowie.
- R1936975 Corporal David King.
- A2996S62 Acting Corporal Catherine Mary Townsend, Women's Royal Air Force.

Civil Division

United Kingdom

- James Edward Adams, Carpenter, Department for National Savings.
- William Cresswell Addy, Locomotive Driver, Leeds (Holbeck), Eastern Region, British Railways Board.
- William Charles Aitken, Chief Petty Officer, SS Esso York, Esso Petroleum Company Ltd.
- Ernest Leslie Allison, Chargehand I (Electrician), Atomic Weapons Research Establishment, Aldermaston, Ministry of Defence.
- Winifred Emma Appleby, Home Help, Lewes, East Sussex.
- John Archibald, lately Head Attendant, National Galleries of Scotland.
- Zilpah Atkinson, National Savings Group Collector, Manchester.
- William Noel Ayres, lately Head Gardener, Anglesey Abbey, The National Trust.
- Margaret Ferguson Badenoch, Collector, Community Savings Group, Edinburgh.
- Leonard Arthur Bailey, Packer, RAF Innsworth, Ministry of Defence.
- Stanley Horace Baines, General Foreman, Framlingham, Eastern Region, British Gas Corporation.
- Andrew Listen Banyard, Ship's Husband, British United Trawlers Ltd., Edinburgh.
- Edward Charles Barnes, Member, Peckham Ambulance and Nursing Division, London (Prince of Wales's) District, St. John Ambulance Association and Brigade.
- William Albert Barrett, Foreign and Commonwealth Office.
- Charles Arnison Bell, Canteen Manager, Navy, Army and Air Force Institutes, Maidstone, Belfast.
- Hilda Bell, Storewoman, Ministry of Defence.
- Edith Bevan, National Savings Group Collector, Aberdare.
- Jean Binns, Senior Leading Firewoman, Greater Manchester Fire Brigade.
- Dorothy Lilian Black, Assistant Storekeeper, Metropolitan Police Office.
- Frederick Blakeley, Crane Driver, John Ake & Company, Dewsbury.
- William George Bolderson, Boatswain, Port Auxiliary Service, Ministry of Defence.
- Florence Mary Bolton, National Savings Group Collector, Coventry.
- Walter Bramhall, Hospital Engineer, Stepping Hill Hospital, Stockport.
- Alfred George Bridges, Deputy Supervisor, Lee Valley Experimental Horticultural Station, Ministry of Agriculture, Fisheries and Food.
- Charles Frank Brown, Fruit Farm Manager, Hadlow College, Kent.
- Gertrude Annie Brown, Canteen Worker, York Unit, Sea Cadet Corps.
- Robert Bruce, Chargehand Process Worker, Windscale Works, British Nuclear Fuels Ltd.
- James Burton, Foreman. For services to agriculture in Cumbria.
- William George Butcher, Dental Technician, Braintree, Essex.
- Frank John Butler, Chief Officer Class I, HM Prison, Brixton.
- George Victor Chapman, Postal Executive C (Overseer), Hull Head Post Office, North Eastern Postal Region.
- Thomas Chesworth, Sub-Officer, Cheshire Fire Brigade.
- Peggy Louisa Clark, Home Help, Hatfield, Hertfordshire.
- Andrew Weir Coid, Sergeant, Royal Ulster Constabulary.
- Albert Austin Collins, Foreign and Commonwealth Office.
- Albert Edward Walter Collins, Gasfitter, North Thames Region, British Gas Corporation.
- Albert William Frederick Crabb, Chief Storekeeper, HMS Drake, Ministry of Defence.
- Eric Craven, Foreman, Applied Electronics Laboratories, Portsmouth, Marconi Space & Defence Systems Ltd.
- William Samuel Crooks, First Class Signalman, Northern Ireland Railways.
- Alice Beatrice Cross. For services to the elderly in Teignmouth, Devon.
- Cecil Alfred Richard Dann, Auxiliary Coastguard-in-Charge, Birling Gap, East Sussex.
- John Mochrie Danskin, Installation Technician, Northern Lighthouse Board.
- Albert Edward Davies, Constable, Merseyside Police.
- Sidney John Derby, Postman Higher Grade, Eastern Central District Office, London Postal Region.
- Stanley Thomas Dilworth, Foreign and Commonwealth Office.
- Charles Frederick Driver, Sergeant, West Mercia Constabulary.
- Adam Drysdale, lately Professional and Technology Officer Grade III, Ministry of Defence.
- John Dunlop, Sergeant, Royal Ulster Constabulary.
- Frederick Arthur Edwards, Production Foreman, Orb Works, Strip Mills Division, British Steel Corporation.
- Joseph Charles Etherington, Basic Mining Instructor, South Nottinghamshire Area Training Centre, Moorgreen, National Coal Board.
- Maurice Henry Fallis, Caretaker, Enniskillen Town Hall and Mace Bearer to Enniskillen Borough Council.
- William Ronald Fancy, General Foreman, Stone Firms Ltd., Portland, Dorset.
- John Richard Farrington, Head of Packing Department, Kangol Wear Ltd, Cleator, Cumbria. For services to Export.
- Grace Rosalind Finch, Forewoman, Yateley Sheltered Workshop, Camberley, Surrey.
- Marjorie Finch. For services to the mentally handicapped in Lancing, West Sussex.
- Edward Horace Fisher, Constable, Metropolitan Police.
- John Fitzsimmons, Quay Foreman, Mersey Docks & Harbour Company.
- George Ernest Geeson, Skilled Labourer, Ministry of Defence.
- James Gibson, Telephone Operator, Scottish Office.
- Martha Glanville, Foster-parent, Pembroke, Dyfed.
- George Gravestock, Distribution Superintendent, Colne Valley Water Company, Watford.
- Arthur Lindsay Gray, Sub-Officer, East Sussex Fire Brigade.
- Walter Guest, Foreman, Samuel Woodhouse & Sons Ltd., Warley, West Midlands.
- Ernest James Hadaway, Senior Paperkeeper, Home Office.
- Charles Henry Haines, Chargehand, Royal Ordnance Factory, Bridgwater, Somerset, Ministry of Defence.
- Edith Hardman. For services to the community in Ramsbottom, Lancashire.
- George William Harnett, Conductor Guard, Ramsgate, Southern Region, British Railways Board.
- Glyndwr Harrison, Foreman, Royal Worcester Industrial Ceramics Ltd., Tonyrefail, South Glamorgan. For services to Export.
- John William Harrison, Foreman, John Hargreaves (Collyhurst & Stalybridge) Ltd, Manchester.
- Elizabeth Harvey, Examiner II, Naval Ordnance Quality Assurance Department, Ministry of Defence.
- Eldon Douglas Haslam, Assistant Inspector, Head Office, Birmingham, Midlands Postal Region.
- Walter George Hayes, Foreman/Production Superintendent, Cossor Ltd., Harlow.
- Ernest Hayward, National Savings Group Collector, Bury St. Edmunds.
- William James Hazley, Chargehand Groundsman, Department of the Environment.
- Clarence Thomas Hedditch, Physical Training Instructor, St. Lawrence's Hospital, Caterham, Surrey.
- Elizabeth Hibbert, lately Warehouse Assistant, HM Stationery Office.
- Walter Stanley Hills, KPFSM, Constable, Metropolitan Police.
- Maisie Hirst, Telephone Exchange Supervisor, Yarrows (Shipbuilders), Glasgow.
- William Alfred Hodges, Museum Technician Grade II, Science Museum.
- Ernest Holmes, Foreman (Operations), Ferrybridge "A" & "B" Power Stations, Central Electricity Generating Board.
- Ronald Hopgood, Sergeant, Metropolitan Police.
- Kathleen Houghton, Supervisor, Central Kitchen, Gainsborough Primary Schools, Lincolnshire.
- Peter Albert Thomas Huckle, Heater Coke Ovens, Corby Tubes Division, British Steel Corporation.
- Cyril George Hughes, Supervisor, British Broadcasting Corporation.
- William Iorwerth Hughes, Sub-Postmaster, Penygroes, Gwynedd, Wales and the Marches Postal Board.
- Edward Charles Hunter, Farm Grieve, Strathmartine Hospital, Dundee.
- George Raymond Hutchings, Constable, Metropolitan Police.
- Fred Jackson, Horticultural Superintendent, Holland and Germany, Commonwealth War Graves Commission.
- William Jackson, Senior Supervisor (Foreman), Electrical Musical Industries Electronics Ltd., Feltham, Middlesex.
- William Skirving Jameson, Production Supervisor (Foreman), Ferranti Ltd, Edinburgh.
- Leonard Hilarion Jenyons, Foreign and Commonwealth Office.
- Alfred William Johnson, Chargehand Plumber, Dover Castle, Department of the Environment.
- Frederick Thomas Jolley, Constable (Dog Handler), City of London Police.
- John Charles Joseph Jones, Higher Grade Cartographic Draughtsman, Ministry of Defence.
- Ronald Jones, Packer Leader, Shotton Works, Strip Mills Division, British Steel Corporation
- William George Turnbull Kay, Professional and Technology Officer Iv, National Engineering Laboratory, Department of Industry.
- Ronald William Kearse, Governor Fitter, Gloucestershire District, South West Gas, British Gas Corporation.
- John Arthur Kendall, Paperkeeper, Chancery Chambers.
- William Kerr, Colliery Overman, Seafield Colliery, Scottish Area, National Coal Board.
- George Raymond Kilburn, Leading Fireman, West Midlands Fire Brigade.
- Phoebe Ann Kilner, Centre Organiser, Bury St. Edmund's, Women's Royal Voluntary Service.
- Robert Alexander King, Document Repairer, Public Record Office, Northern Ireland.
- Wilfred Kitchen, Land Warden, Dorchester, Department of the Environment.
- Tadeusz Karol Kozakiewicz, Machine Shop Foreman, D. Timmins & Sons (Bristol) Ltd., Fishponds, Bristol. For services to export.
- George Laird, Divisional Inspector, Merseyside Passenger Transport Executive.
- Frank Henry Langthorne, Air Traffic Control Assistant I, London Air Traffic Control Centre, Civil Aviation Authority.
- John Edward Latham, Staff Sergeant Instructor, Exeter School Combined Cadet Force, Exeter.
- Peter Laverton, Petty Officer, Shell Tankers (U.K.) Ltd.
- Samuel Gordon Leathem, Sergeant, Royal Ulster Constabulary.
- Albert William Legrand, Craftsman, Royal Mint.
- Robert Stanley Lennon, Gardener (Class 1), Moss Side Hospital, Department of Health and Social Security.
- Freda Leslie, Health and Hospital Welfare Organiser, Stockport, Women's Royal Voluntary Service.
- Jack Owen Litton, lately Divisional Chief Petty Officer, Britannia Royal Naval College, Ministry of Defence.
- Vivian Spencer Roy Long, Senior Railman, Exeter St. Davids, Western Region, British Railways Board.
- Victor Leslie Longley, Senior Paperkeeper, Civil Service Department.
- Cyril Clement Lord, Transport Supervisor, Harry Neal Ltd., Edgware.
- Georgina Emily McBrien, Member, County Borough Staff (Meals-on-Wheels Organiser), Bath, Women's Royal Voluntary Service.
- Alexander Mackenzie, Head Porter, Aberdeen Royal Infirmary.
- Margaret Mackenzie, Church organist, HM Prison, Inverness.
- Robert Alexander MacTaggart, Sergeant, City of Glasgow Police.
- Richard Stephen Marks, Camp Supervisor, Metropolitan Police Corps Training Camp, Loughton
- Cyril Marsh, Finish Turner, Dunford Hadfields Ltd., Sheffield.
- Audrey Mary Martin, National Savings Group Collector, North Tawton, Devon.
- Victor Thomas Martin, Principal Linkman, Royal Opera House, Covent Garden.
- Thomas Masterton, Electrician, Central and South West Scotland Area, South of Scotland Electricity Board.
- Philip Messenger, Standards Inspector, Howson-Algraphy Ltd., Leeds.
- Harold Norman Milford, Coach Driver, Greenslades Tours Ltd., Exeter.
- Cyril Raymond Mills, Surveyor Grade 4, Ordnance Survey.
- Frederick Charles Mitchell, Revenue Constable, Board of Customs and Excise.
- Elsie Jane Morgan, Member, Cardigan VI Detachment, Cardigan Branch, British Red Cross Society.
- Jane Murray Morris, Deputy Station Catering Manageress, Glasgow Queen Street, Scottish Region, British Railways Board.
- John Jenkyn Morris, Driver/Porter, Gwent Hospital Management Committee.
- Ida Marion Mullins, Group Leader, Isle of Wight Branch, British Red Cross Society.
- Peter Donovan Mummery, Experimental Worker Grade I, Ministry of Agriculture, Fisheries and Food.
- Ellen Nellie Murphy, Cleaner, Southern Gas, British Gas Corporation.
- James Murphy, Sergeant, Royal Ulster Constabulary.
- Alfred Newman, Meter Mechanician, East Midlands Electricity Board.
- Albert Ernest Nickes, Divisional Commander, West Midlands Police Special Constabulary.
- Robert Outterside, Sub-Officer, Northumberland Fire Brigade.
- Samuel Edward Owen, lately Process and General Supervisory Grade IV, Quality Assurance Directorate (Weapons), Royal Ordnance Factory, Chorley, Ministry of Defence.
- John James Owens, Technical Officer, Belfast, Northern Ireland Postal and Telecommunications Board.
- Edwin Parsons, Production Superintendent, Bensons International Systems Ltd., Brimscombe, Stroud, Gloucestershire. For services to Export.
- Margaret Jane Fraser Paterson. For services to the community in Penicuik, Midlothian.
- Daniel Paxton, Training Officer (Mining), Bates Colliery, Northumberland Area, National Coal Board.
- Ethel Pearce, National Savings Group Collector, Dartford.
- Stanley Bowman Pearson, Constable, Northumberland Constabulary.
- Edgar Plunkett, Section Manager, Colliery Arch Plant, Teesside and Workington Group, General Steels Division, British Steel Corporation.
- Arthur Lawrence Polk, Head Janitor, Jordanhill College of Education, Glasgow.
- Amy Rose Pond, Forewoman, Plessey Avionics & Communications Ltd., Ilford, Essex.
- Edward Richard Charles Ransley, lately Process and General Supervisory Class Grade IV, Ministry of Defence.
- Samuel Patton Raphael, Head Forester, Ministry of Agriculture for Northern Ireland.
- Robert Roberts, Engineering Technical Grade IV, Ministry of Defence.
- Peter Robinson, Office Keeper Grade III, Board of Customs and Excise.
- William Cutter Rolling, Engineering Workshop Supervisor, Crawley, British Caledonian Airways Ltd.
- Lily Matilda Rudge, lately Member, Centre Staff, Mansfield, Women's Royal Voluntary Service.
- Harold Ernest Rumens, Professional and Technology Officer Grade IV, Ministry of Defence.
- Desmond Leonard Savage, Chief Observer, No. 3 (Oxford) Group, Royal Observer Corps.
- Michael Shanley, Plant Attendant, Independent Broadcasting Authority.
- Albert Shepherd, Mason/Bricklayer, Parsonage Colliery, Western Area, National Coal Board.
- Sydney Tom Shotter, Technical Officer, Purchasing and Supply Department, Birmingham, Post Office.
- Victor Henry Spence, Station Officer, Fire Authority for Northern Ireland.
- Patrick Joseph Stack, Police Sergeant, Ministry of Defence Police.
- James George Leonard Steenson, Sub-Officer, Fire Authority for Northern Ireland.
- Albert Leslie Stroud, Assembly Fitter, The MEL Equipment Company Ltd., Crawley, West Sussex.
- John Alfred Stupples, Driver, East Kent Road Car Company Ltd.
- Dennis Joseph Sullivan, Regional General Foreman, Cheshire and Lancashire, George Wimpey & Company Ltd.
- Ernest George Tapper, lately Professional and Technology Officer Grade IV, Ministry of Defence.
- William Delme Thomas, Linesman, West Wales District, South Wales Electricity Board.
- Thomas Thornton, Drawing Office Assistant, British Transport Docks Board.
- Constance Esther Tizard, Member, Midland Regional Staff, Birmingham, Women's Royal Voluntary Service.
- Mary Elspith McBain Tully, Clothing Organiser, South East Scotland, Women's Royal Voluntary Service.
- William Vickers, lately Chief Officer Class II, HM Prison, Perth.
- Cecil Ellis Wand, Tester, Chief Engineer's Department, Metropolitan Police Office.
- Frederick Charles Watts. For services to seamen in the Port of Bristol.
- James Edward Wells, lately Section Manager, Plating and Polishing, Garrard Engineering Ltd.
- Frederick John Stanley Wheadon, Operating Theatre Attendant, Lambeth Hospital, London.
- Christopher Jack Wheeler, Station Master, Victoria Coach Station, National Travel (NBC) Ltd.
- Thomas Sergeant Wilkins, Case Maker, Raleigh Industries Ltd., Nottingham. For services to Export.
- Eveline Annie Willis, Street Group Collector, Armagh.
- William Henry Wilson. For services to the community, particularly to the hospitals, in the Sheffield and Barnsley areas.
- Fred Winn, Electrician, Yorkshire Electricity Board.
- George Witcomb, Mule Spinner, William Pearson & Company (Leeds) Ltd.
- Maurice Edward James Woodward, Head Office Attendant, Euston, London Midland Region, British Railways Board.
- Walter William Woolner, lately Instructor, Apprentice Training School, Doncaster Works, British Rail Engineering Ltd.
- Victor Claude Woolnough, Foreman, Rothamsted Experimental Station, Harpenden, Hertfordshire.

Overseas Territories

- Robelto James Blanc, Government Printer, Dominica.
- Chan Wing-fai, Senior Clerical Officer, Home Affairs Department, Hong Kong.
- Lionel Elton Gentle, Forest Ranger, Belize.
- Ma Ping, Revenue Inspector, Preventive Service, Commerce and Industry Department, Hong Kong.
- Sydney Albert Edward Murphy, CPM, formerly Station Sergeant, Royal St. Vincent Police Force.
- Abdul Emerun Mahomed Rafeek, Sports Convenor, Civil Aid Services, Hong Kong.
- Nancie Vincent, Housekeeper, Government House, Hong Kong.
- Frederick Henry Yon, Master, Lady Field Home for Children, St. Helena.
- Rose Maud Yon, Matron, Lady Field Home for Children, St. Helena.

Australian States

State of New South Wales

- James Anderson. For services to local government.
- Sydney Joyce Arnold. For services to the Girl Guide Movement.
- Elizabeth Margaret Bannan. For services to education.
- Alfred Beashel. For services to sport.
- William Henry Bell. For services to ex-servicemen.
- Arthur Aubrey Budd. For services to the community.
- Cyril Thomas Burke. For services to sport.
- Edward Charles Chapman. For services to ex-servicemen.
- Robert Clendenning. For services to local government.
- William Robert Cooke. For services to the community.
- Richard Cyril Corish. For services to sport.
- Lawrence Dowling Davis. For services to local government.
- Lurline Violet Davis. Head Housemaid, Government House.
- Harry Ewan Delves. For services to the community.
- Ernest John Evans. For services to the community.
- Norman Edward Fiford. For services to local government.
- Francis John Foster. Overseer, Mechanical Section, Government Printing Office.
- Ronald Herbert Garrety. For services to the community.
- Harold Moore Gregson. For services to the community.
- John Hegarty, lately Special Assistant, New South Wales Government Printing Office.
- Freda Alice Hundt. For services to medicine.
- Stanley David Kitchener Hyde. For services to local government.
- Amy Isaline Keetch. For services to the community.
- Roma Lillian Laurie. For services to the community.
- Ida Dorothy Love, lately Matron, Women's Hospital (Crown Street).
- Robert Leonard Luben. Senior Attendant/Storeman in the State Electoral Office.
- The Reverend Colin Campbell McKeith. For services to the community and the Presbyterian Church.
- Ronald MacKillop. Caretaker, Government House.
- Sidney David Marshall. For services to civil aviation.
- Donald Roderick Matheson. For services to surf life saving.
- Austin Ernest Mooney. Regional Administrative Officer, New South Wales Hospitals Commission.
- John Edward O'Reilly, lately Senior Examiner, Miners' Pensions and Long Service Leave Branch, Department of Mines.
- Barbara Anne Parker. For services to the State.
- Una Jane Parker. For services to the community.
- Vincent Carl Penzig. For services to the community.
- Sylvia Faith Randall. For services to the community.
- Leslie Daniel Ryan, For services to primary industry.
- Councillor James Duncan Simpson. For services to local government.
- Charles Robert Stewart. For services to the community.
- Hiram Henry Joseph Struck. For services to the surf live saving movement.
- Harry Ernest Tarran, Assistant Manager (Schools), Building Construction and Maintenance Branch, Department of Public Works.
- William John Vincent. For services to the community.
- Raymond Henry White. For services to motor cycling.
- Arthur Stanley Young, Officer in Charge of the Electrocardiograph Department, Prince Henry Hospital.

State of Victoria

- Ethel Una Armstrong, Personal Stenographer to the Victorian Director of Finance.
- Nancie Walker Gaylard, of Shepparton. For services to the Red Cross.
- Leslie Herbert Gow, of Leitchville. For services to the community.
- Ernest George Harratt, of Coburg. For services to the Sailors', Soldiers' and Airmen's Fathers Association.
- Dympna Agnes Hoysted, of Wangaratta. For services to the community.
- Thomas Claude Johnston, of Phillip Island. For services as a Ranger at Kinglake National Park.
- Mary Ellen Joyce, of Burwood. For Public Service.
- John Hector Fergus McDonald, of Maffra. For services to the community.
- Catherine Marriott, of Oakleigh. For services to the community.
- Paul Colin Newnham, of Tongio. For services to the community.
- Kevin Stanislaus Pratt, of Ringwood. For services to the community.
- Elsie McClelland Stafford, of Balwyn. For services to children and as Infant Welfare Sister.
- Janet Rose Stanford, of Tyrendarra. For services to the community.
- Dorothea Alice Steele, of Queenscliff. For services to the community.
- Kathleen Teychenne, of Traralgon. For services to music and the arts.
- Vida Jane Trainor, of Avoca. For services to the community.
- Doris Elizabeth Twist, of Camberwell. For services to the mentally ill.
- Dorothy Jean Williams, of East Malvern For services to the community.

State of Queensland

- Rose May Atkins, of Stanthorpe. For services to the community.
- Ceciley Rose Cranstoun, of Ascot. For services to the community and the welfare of children.
- Olive Dorothea Hill, of Toombul. For her devoted services to Migrants.
- Alfred Johnson of Eromanga. For his community services in times of stress and emergency.
- James Alexander Kidd, of Windorah. For his community services in times of stress and emergency.
- Maxwell Neil West-McInnes, of Quilpie. For his community services in times of stress and emergency.
- Irene Edith Simmons, of Yarranlea. For services to the community.
- Annie Elizabeth Lily Spork, of Albion Heights. For her devoted services to Senior Citizens.

State of Western Australia

- Ada Eliza Pickersgill, of Busselton. For services to the community.

=== Royal Red Cross (RRC) ===
- Lieutenant-Colonel Myra Gwendoline Mary Rowley (420148), Queen Alexandra's Royal Army Nursing Corps.
- Lieutenant-Colonel Sheila May Tyler, TD, (416736), Queen Alexandra's Royal Army Nursing Corps, Territorial and Army Volunteer Reserve.

==== Associate of the Royal Red Cross (ARRC) ====
- Joyce Florence Luce, Superintending Sister, Queen Alexandra's Royal Naval Nursing Service.
- Major Mary Evelyn Dorothy Clements (468343), Queen Alexandra's Royal Army Nursing Corps.
- Major Joan Elizabeth Pease (428654), Queen Alexandra's Royal Army Nursing Corps.
- Lieutenant-Colonel Lilian Margaret Christy Ritchie, TD, (456844), Queen Alexandra's Royal Army Nursing Corps, Territorial and Army Volunteer Reserve.
- Acting Squadron Officer Elizabeth Angela Innes Sandison (408108), Princess Mary's Royal Air Force Nursing Service.
- Flight Officer Constance Veronica Oxborough (408397), Princess Mary's Royal Air Force Nursing Service.

=== Air Force Cross (AFC) ===
Army

- Major Ian Chalmers Scott (478400), Army Air Corps.

Royal Air Force

- Wing Commander David Allen Cowley (607666).
- Squadron Leader Trevor Davies, DFC, (54203).
- Squadron Leader Harold George Haines (2611805).
- Squadron Leader Peter John Harding (4230762).
- Squadron Leader Anthony Edward Ryle (505723).
- Squadron Leader Iain Derek Calder Tite (607753).
- Flight Lieutenant Gerald Sidney Franklin (587301).
- Flight Lieutenant Colin James Hughes (3522555).
- Flight Lieutenant Richard Ulric Langworthy (3516433).
- Flight Lieutenant Michael Henry Bruce Snelling (609238), (Retired).

Bar to the Air Force Cross

- Flight Lieutenant Ronald Godfrey Ledwidge, AFC, (3523672).

=== Queen's Police Medal (QPM) ===
England and Wales

- Frederick Arthur Cutting, Chief Constable, Northamptonshire Police.
- John Cottingham Alderson, Chief Constable, Devon and Cornwall Constabulary.
- Walter Henry Stapleton, Assistant Commissioner, City of London Police.
- William Alfred Petherick, Assistant Chief Constable, Essex Police.
- Matthew David Rodger, Commander, Metropolitan Police.
- Leslie Garrett, Commander, Metropolitan Police.
- Harold Dudley Walton, Commander, Metropolitan Police.
- Geoffrey Thomas Ashdown, Chief Superintendent, Metropolitan Police.
- Denis Edwin Frederick Silverwood, Chief Superintendent, Nottinghamshire Constabulary – seconded as Staff Officer to Her Majesty's Inspector of Constabulary, Nottingham.
- Thomas Francis Rankin, Chief Superintendent, Lancashire Constabulary.
- John Howard Davies, Chief Superintendent, South Wales Constabulary.
- Peter Douglas Peterson, Chief Superintendent West Midlands Police.
- Eric Roland Coleman, Chief Superintendent, Hampshire Constabulary.
- Frank William Garner Broadbent, Chief Superintendent, West Midlands Police.
- Norah Hughes, Superintendent, Hertfordshire Constabulary.

Northern Ireland

- Samuel John Newell, Constable, Royal Ulster Constabulary.

Scotland

- Alexander Campbell, Chief Constable, Dumfries and Galloway Constabulary.
- Alexander McGarvey, GM, lately Chief Superintendent, City of Glasgow Police Force.

Overseas Territories

- Gerald Arthur Harknett, CPM, Chief Superintendent, Royal Hong Kong Police Force.
- James Nichols, CPM, Deputy Commissioner, Royal St. Lucia Police Force.
- Raymond Francis Smith, CPM, Assistant Commissioner, Royal Hong Kong Police Force.

Australian States

State of Victoria

- Bonar Jefferson Brown, Chief Superintendent, Victoria Police Force.
- Albert Edward Cole, Senior Constable, Victoria Police Force.
- Paul Delianis, Inspector, Victoria Police Force.
- Harry Ford, Chief Superintendent, Victoria Police Force.
- Francis Raymond Kelly, Chief Superintendent, Victoria Police Force.
- Geoffrey Anzac De Vere, Chief Inspector, Victoria Police Force.

State of Queensland

- Victor Archibald McKean, Inspector, Queensland Police Force.
- John Kevin McMahon, Superintendent, Queensland Police Force.
- John William McNeil, Superintendent, Queensland Police Force.
- Douglas Clarence Winning, Inspector, Queensland Police Force.

State of South Australia

- Wallace Byron Budd, Inspector, 1st Class, South Australian Police Force.

State of Western Australia

- William Herbert Grigo, Superintendent, Western Australian Police Force.
- Thomas Graham Lee, Superintendent, Western Australian Police Force.

=== Queen's Fire Services Medal (QFSM) ===
England and Wales

- Norman Rose, Deputy Assistant Chief Fire Officer, London Fire Brigade.
- Kenneth Lockyer, Chief Fire Officer, Leicestershire Fire Brigade.
- Kevin Koran, Chief Fire Officer, West Yorkshire Fire Brigade.
- Arthur William Leonard Howes, Divisional Officer, Grade I (Deputy Chief Officer), Gwynedd Fire Brigade

Scotland

- Alfred Jones, FIFireE, Firemaster, Angus Area Fire Brigade.

Australian States

State of South Australia

- Dudley George Eve, Chief Officer, South Australian Fire Brigade.

=== Colonial Police Medal (CPM) ===
- Harry Brown, Superintendent of Police, British Solomon Islands Police Force.
- Peter Anthony English, Chief Inspector of Police, Royal Hong Kong Police Force.
- Artro Evans, Superintendent of Police, Royal Hong Kong Police Force.
- Fan Kwok-choi, Senior Inspector of Police (Auxiliary), Royal Hong Kong Auxiliary Police Force.
- Ionatana Ionatana, Inspector of Police, Gilbert and Ellice Islands Constabulary.
- Charles McGregor Johnston, Superintendent of Police, Royal Hong Kong Police Force.
- Harry Kenyon, Assistant Chief Ambulance Officer, Hong Kong Fire Services.
- Lau Yiu, Police Station Sergeant, Royal Hong Kong Police Force.
- Leung Kai-yan, Police Station Sergeant, Royal Hong Kong Police Force.
- Lo Chau, Principal Fireman, Hong Kong Fire Services.
- Charles Derek Mayger, Superintendent of Police, Royal Hong Kong Police Force.
- William Patrick McMahon, Superintendent of Police, Royal Hong Kong Police Force.
- Miao Feng-chao, Police Sergeant, Royal Hong Kong Police Force.
- Joseph Charles Morello, Superintendent of Police, Gibraltar Police Force.
- Patrick George David Nash, Chief Inspector of Police, Royal Hong Kong Police Force.
- Patrick William Park, Chief Inspector of Police, Royal Hong Kong Police Force.
- Po Cheuk-pui, Principal Ambulanceman, Hong Kong Fire Services.
- Poon Kam-fai, Police Sergeant, Royal Hong Kong Police Force.
- James Prudent, Inspector, Royal St. Lucia Police Force.
- Gordon James Riddell, Superintendent of Police, Royal Hong Kong Police Force.
- James Montgomery Roberts, Assistant Superintendent of Police, Royal Antigua Police Force.
- Tam Hon-cheung, Assistant Divisional Officer, Hong Kong Fire Services.
- Tsung Shu-tien, Police Sergeant, Royal Hong Kong Police Force.
- Wan Yee-yep, Police Constable, Royal Hong Kong Police Force.
- Wong Chiu, Police Sergeant, Royal Hong Kong Police Force.
- Wong Peng-kwan, Superintendent of Police (Auxiliary) Royal Hong Kong Auxiliary Police Force.
- Julio Yuen, Divisional Officer, Hong Kong Auxiliary Fire Service.

=== Queen's Commendation for Valuable Service in the Air ===
Army

- Captain Keith Emerson Reid (470889), Army Air Corps.

Royal Air Force

- Wing Commander Chesney William Noel Kennedy, MBE, (4034675).
- Squadron Leader Michael Paul Bowker (4094027).
- Squadron Leader Brian John Clifford (608479).
- Squadron Leader Ivor Charles Gibbs (4230502).
- Squadron Leader Geoffrey Norman Mannings (2220389).
- Squadron Leader Kenneth George Sneller, AFC, (1330764).
- Flight Lieutenant Peter Richard Colin Chapman (4231781).
- Flight Lieutenant Peter Warneford Day (4231751).
- Flight Lieutenant Peter James Diggance (4230179).
- Flight Lieutenant Michael Alan Hindley (2615412).
- Flight Lieutenant Henry Michael Horscroft (3519417).
- Flight Lieutenant Kenneth Lamb (4231319).
- Flight Lieutenant Barry Lawrence (608501).
- Flight Lieutenant Alastair McKay (608681).
- Flight Lieutenant Hilton Henry Moses (4244715).
- Flight Lieutenant Hedley Francis Shepherd (1256948).
- Flight Lieutenant Clive John Thompson (687492).
- Flight Lieutenant Peter John Wilde (4053197), (Retired).

United Kingdom

- John Blair, Chief Test Pilot, Prestwick Airport, Scottish Aviation Ltd.
- William John Cleland, Senior Captain First Class VC10 Flight, British Airways.
- Eric Vivian Goodyear, Superintendent Flight Engineer, British Caledonian Airways Ltd
- Maurice Donald William Lothian, Fleet Manager Boeing 707, British Caledonian Airways Ltd.
- James McKissick, Chief Steward, British Airways.
- Peter Frederick Woolland, Senior Training Captain Trident 3, British Airways.

== Papua New Guinea ==
=== Knight Bachelor ===
- Paul Lapun, MHA, Minister for Mines. For long and distinguished services to politics and to the community in Papua New Guinea.
- Horace Lionel Richard Niall, CBE, first Speaker of the House of Assembly, Papua New Guinea, from 1964 to 1968. For long and distinguished services to the development of Papua New Guinea.

=== Order of the British Empire ===
==== Commander of the Order of the British Empire (CBE) ====
Civil Division

- Tei Abal, MHA, former Under Secretary for Labour and former Minister for Agriculture, Stock and Fisheries. For outstanding services to the people of Papua New Guinea in the fields of health and government.

==== Officer of the Order of the British Empire (OBE) ====
Civil Division

- Vernon Guise, President, Maramatana Local Government Council since 1964 and President, Local Government Association of Papua New Guinea. For services to local government and the community in Papua New Guinea.
- Soso Subi, Member, Coffee Marketing Board since 1967. For services to local government and economic development in Papua New Guinea.
- Frederick Boski Tom, MBE, former President, New Hanover Council, former Member, New Ireland District Council and former teacher. For services to education and the community in Papua New Guinea.
- The Most Reverend Dr. Louis Vangeke, Auxiliary Bishop to the Roman Catholic Archbishop of Port Moresby. For religious and community services to the people of Papua New Guinea.

==== Member of the Order of the British Empire (MBE) ====
Civil Division

- Ping Quan Hui, member of various community associations. For services to the Chinese community and Papua New Guinea.
- Himop Kesau, Hospital Assistant in charge of the Wewak Town Clinic. For services in the field of health to the people of Papua New Guinea.
- Lois Elizabeth Mylius, Foundation Member of the Port Moresby Community Development Group. For services to social development and urbanisation in Papua New Guinea.
- Ron Neville, MHA, Member of the House of Assembly since 1964, Member, Southern Highlands Area Authority. For services to the development of Papua New Guinea, in particular the Southern Highlands
- Edwin Gerhard Tsharke, missionary worker since 1941. For services to the people of Papua New Guinea in the fields of health and health education.
- Sunei Ukiok, Government Interpreter. For public service in Papua New Guinea since 1938.

=== British Empire Medal (BEM) ===
Civil Division

- Tau Boga, Teaching Service Commissioner. For public service in Papua New Guinea.
- William George, Member, Central District Advisory Board and Trustee, Laloki Co-operative College. For services to the co-operative movement in Papua New Guinea.
- Wilfred Moi, Medical Superintendent, Laloki Psychiatric Centre. For public service in Papua New Guinea.
- Joseph Nombri, Associate District Commissioner, Southern Highlands District. For public service in Papua New Guinea.
- Sergeant (First Class) Kanyungen Wakalain, Royal Papua New Guinea Constabulary. For public service in Papua New Guinea since 1939.

== Mauritius ==
=== Order of the British Empire ===
==== Officer of the Order of the British Empire (OBE) ====
Civil Division

- Ecoop Baureek. For voluntary social work.
- Louis Marie Joseph Therese Espitalier-Noel. For voluntary social work.
- Bhoopal Beeharry Panray. For public services.
- Mootoosamy Sidambaram. For public services

==== Member of the Order of the British Empire (MBE) ====
- Hosman Amode Mohung. For services to primary education.
- Marie Edith Rugen, BEM, lately Chief Nursing Officer, Ministry of Health.

=== Queen's Police Medal ===
- Joseph Pierre Henri Perrier, CPM, Deputy Commissioner, Mauritius Police Force

== Fiji ==
=== Order of Saint Michael and Saint George ===
==== Companion of the Order of St Michael and St George (CMG) ====
- Robert Tait Sanders, Secretary to the Cabinet and for Foreign Affairs.

=== Order of the British Empire ===
==== Commander of the Order of the British Empire (CBE) ====
Civil Division

- Josua Rasilau Rabukawaqa, MVO, MBE, Fiji High Commissioner in London.

==== Officer of the Order of the British Empire (OBE) ====
Military Division

Royal Fiji Military Forces

- Lieutenant-Colonel Paul Fanifau Manueli, Chief of Staff, Royal Fiji Military Forces.

Civil Division

- John Wansbrough Gittins. For services, especially in the United Kingdom, on behalf of people from Fiji.
- Richard Francis Edward Herman. For services to the community and especially to the St. John Ambulance Brigade.

==== Member of the Order of the British Empire (MBE) ====
Civil Division

- Manasa Tuisawau Ravai. For services to the community and to sport.
- Shankar Nar Singh. For services to rural development and the community.

=== British Empire Medal ===
Civil Division

- Henry Hans Lal. For services in local government and to the community.

== Bahamas ==
=== Knight Bachelor ===
- Leonard Joseph Knowles, CBE, Chief Justice.

=== Order of the British Empire ===
==== Dame Commander of the Order of the British Empire (DBE) ====
Civil Division

- Albertha Madeline Isaacs. For services to the community.

==== Commander of the Order of the British Empire (CBE) ====
Civil Division

- Bishop Alvin Simon Moss, Overseer of the Church of God's Prophecy.

==== Officer of the Order of the British Empire (OBE) ====
Civil Division

- Enoch Pedro Roberts. For his services as a teacher.

==== Member of the Order of the British Empire (MBE) ====
Civil Division

- Reuben Nathaniel Gomez, Deputy Postmaster of the Bahamas.

=== British Empire Medal (BEM) ===
Civil Division

- John Hamilton Hudson, Senior Superintendent, Blue Hills Desalination Plant.

== Grenada ==
=== Order of the British Empire ===
==== Commander of the Order of the British Empire (CBE) ====
Civil Division

- Leonard Merrydale Commissiong. For services to medicine and the community.

==== Officer of the Order of the British Empire (OBE) ====
Civil Division

- Emmanuel Franklyn Cherman, MBE, Chairman, Land Development Control Authority.
- Barry Adolphus Rapier, Medical Superintendent.

==== Member of the Order of the British Empire (MBE) ====
Civil Division

- Samuel Nelson Cox, JP, Senior Executive Officer.
- Neville Dominic Nedd, Agricultural Assistant (Agronomy).
- Thomas Carlyle Payne, Training Officer.
