= Catherine Easton Renfrew =

Speech therapist

Catherine E. Renfrew MBE, FRCSLT
- Born: 1901
- Died: 2002 (aged 100–101)
- Occupation: Speech therapist

Catherine Easton Renfrew, MBE, FRCSLT (died 2002) was a British speech therapist.

== Career ==
Renfrew was Chief Speech Therapist for United Oxford Hospitals.

During her career Renfrew pioneered three forms of expressive language assessments: The Renfrew Action Picture Test (RAPT), in which a child describes a picture with a single sentence, assesses the length and complexity of spoken sentence structure in 3–8 year olds; the Renfrew Bus Story involves story re-telling to assess oral and narrative skills in 3–8 year olds; and Renfrew word finding assesses word finding abilities through the naming of pictures and the recording of errors in 3–9 year olds.

== Awards ==
Renfrew was elected a Fellow of the Royal College of Speech and Language Therapists in 1950. She was awarded the Honours of the RCSLT in 1982. Following her death, the RCSLT instituted a biennial award in her memory. The Catherine Renfrew Memorial Award encourages international collaboration and attendance at non-UK conferences and events through an award of £500.

She was awarded a MBE in the 1974 Birthday Honours.

== Selected publications ==
- Renfrew, C. E. and Mitchell, P. 2015 (4th edition). Bus story test : a test of narrative speech. UK, Speechmark Publishing.
- Renfrew, C. E. 1997. Renfrew language scales / Action picture test. Bicester, Oxon, Speechmark.
- Renfrew, C. E. 1976. "Screening for Language Disorders in Preschool Children", Developmental Medicine and Chid Neurology 18(1). 97–98. doi:10.1111/j.1469-8749.1976.tb03612.x
- Renfrew, C. E. 1972. "Prediction of Persisting Speech Defect", International Journal of Language and Communication Disorders 8(1). 37–41. doi:10.3109/13682827309011583
- Renfrew, C. E. 1972. Speech disorders in children. Oxford, Pergamon Press.
- Renfrew, C. 1968. The child who does not talk : report of an International Study Group, St. Mary's College, Durham, 1963 on The Development and the Disorders of Hearing, Language and Speech in Children. London, Spastics International Medical Publications.
- Renfrew, C. E. 1966. "Persistence of the Open Syllable in Defective Articulation", Journal of Speech and Hearing Disorders 31. 370–373 doi:10.1044/jshd.3104.370
- Calnan, J. and Renfrew, C. E. 1960–1961. "Blowing tests and speech", British Journal of Plastic Surgery 13. 340–346. doi:10.1016/S0007-1226(60)80064-1
