= Monarchy of Papua New Guinea =

King of Papua New Guinea
- Emblem of Papua New Guinea

Incumbent
- Charles III since 8 September 2022

Details
- Style: His Majesty
- Heir apparent: William, Prince of Wales
- First monarch: Elizabeth II
- Formed: 16 September 1975

The monarchy of Papua New Guinea is a system of government in which a hereditary monarch is the head of state of Papua New Guinea. The current Papua New Guinean monarch and head of state, since 8 September 2022, is King Charles III. As monarch, he is the personal embodiment of the Papua New Guinean Crown. Although the person of the monarch is equally shared with 14 other independent countries within the Commonwealth of Nations, each country's monarchy is separate and legally distinct. As a result, the current monarch is officially titled King of Papua New Guinea and, in this capacity, he and other members of the royal family undertake public and private functions domestically and abroad as representatives of Papua New Guinea. However, the King is the only member of the royal family with any constitutional role.

All executive authority is formally vested in the monarch; however, the authority for these acts stems from the country’s populace, in which sovereignty is vested, and the monarch’s direct participation in governance is limited. Most of the powers are exercised by the elected members of parliament, the National Executive Council generally drawn from amongst them, and the judges on the bench.

The Crown today primarily functions as a guarantor of continuous and stable governance and a nonpartisan safeguard against the abuse of power. While some powers are exercisable only by the monarch, most of the monarch's operational and ceremonial duties are exercised by his representative, the governor-general of Papua New Guinea.

== History ==
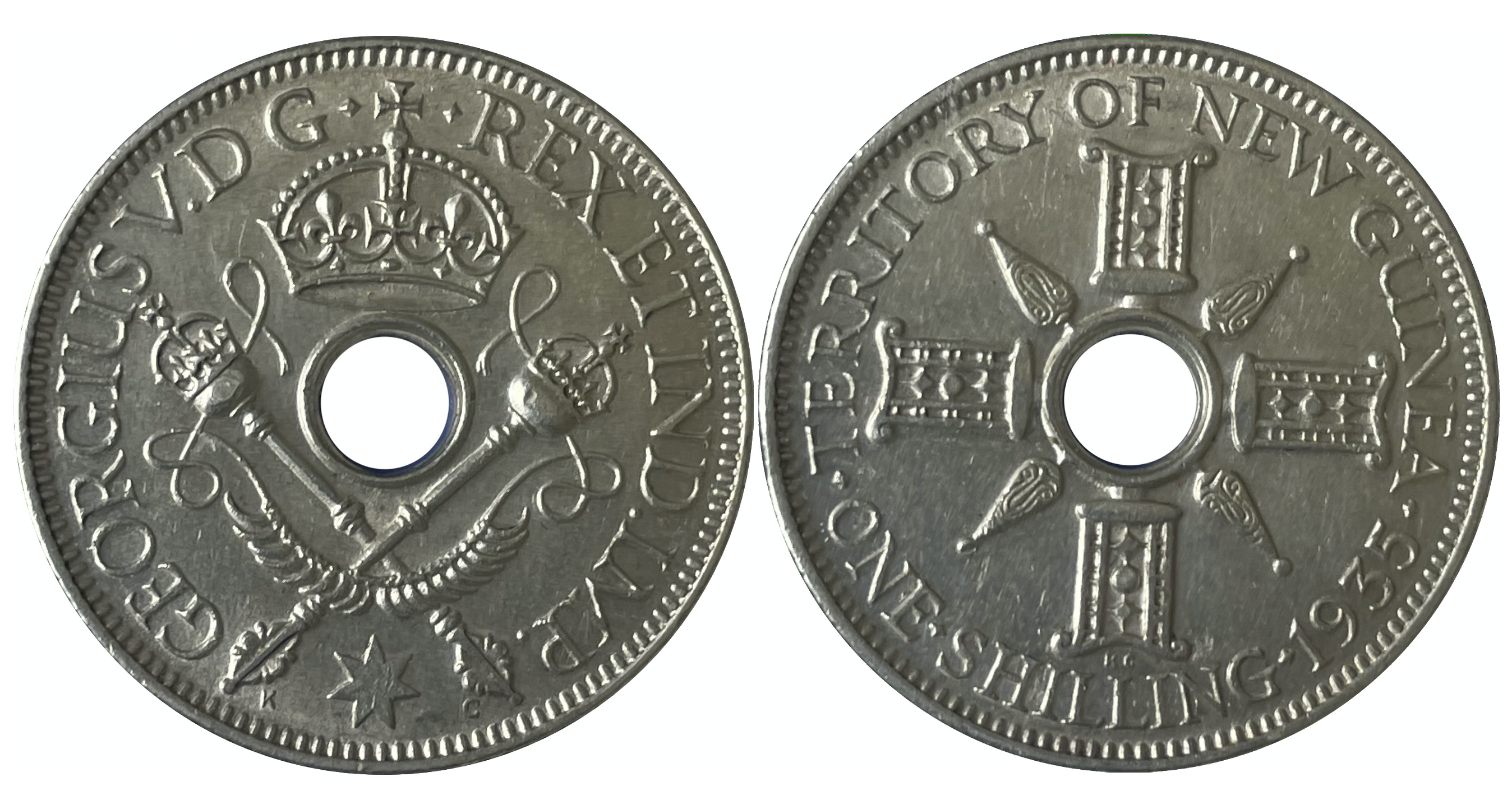
A New Guinean one-shilling coin, 1935

The first European attempt at colonisation was made in 1793 by Lieutenant John Hayes, a British naval officer, near Manokwari, now in Papua province, Indonesia. It was the Dutch, however, who claimed the western half of the island as part of the Dutch East Indies in 1828; their control remained nominal until 1898, when their first permanent administrative posts were set up at Fakfak and Manokwari.

In 1884, Germany formally took possession of the northeast quarter of the island and it became known as German New Guinea. In 1884, a British protectorate was proclaimed over Papua – the southern coast of New Guinea. The protectorate, called British New Guinea, was annexed outright on 4 September 1888 and possession passed to the newly federated Commonwealth of Australia in 1902 and British New Guinea became the Australian Territory of Papua, with Australian administration beginning in 1906. During the First World War, Australian forces displaced the German authorities on New Guinea, and the arrangement was formalised in 1921, when Australian control of the northeastern quadrant of the island was mandated by the League of Nations.

King George VI's Coronation stamps issued in Papua, 1937

In 1945, Australia combined its administration of Papua and that of the former mandate into the Territory of Papua and New Guinea, which it administered from Canberra via Port Moresby. From 1946, Australia managed the New Guinea (eastern) half as a United Nations trust territory. General elections for a House of Assembly were held in 1964, 1968, and 1972; self-government was achieved on 1 December 1973, and full independence from Australia on 16 September 1975.

=== Road to independent monarchy ===
In February 1974, a year after self-government and discussions gathered momentum on the question for a date for independence, Queen Elizabeth II of Australia visited Papua New Guinea. In a speech before a crowd of 25,000 people, the Queen said, "The movement towards independence has been gaining speed in recent years and the decisive moment is not far off". She continued: "As Queen of Australia I can assure you of continuing friendship and assistance as you set out on the path of independent nationhood". Chief Minister Michael Somare in his speech reaffirmed Papua New Guinea's desire and hope to join the Commonwealth of Nations upon independence. However, there was no indication of a continuing role for the Queen in independent Papua New Guinea when, in April 1975, it was decided that the head of state was to be a citizen of the country, who would be chosen by secret ballot.

On 5 May 1975, it was announced that Papua New Guinea would join the Commonwealth upon independence, with Somare aspiring to make the new nation a republic. However, on 19 May, it was suddenly announced that the Cabinet would propose to the Constituent Assembly that the Queen become head of state. The Cabinet statement stated that continued ties with the Queen would give a "sense of security to a significant section of the community", as the early years of independence would be "years of adjustment and settling down", with the position to be reviewed after three years. Though the decision delighted some people in centres and villages, protests were lodged by university students and some opposition members. In the House of Assembly, Somare urged politicians not to shame the country by using the Queen as a political football. He said that the Queen's position as head of state would not undermine the country's sovereignty or independence, and the framework would help the country in its dealings with other members of the Commonwealth. The government also wished to retain all the traditional knighthoods and decorations. Groups from various parts of the country voiced their support for Somare's decision.

On 5 June 1975, the Constituent Assembly rejected by 57 votes to 26 an amendment to the draft constitution which would have made Papua New Guinea a republic upon independence. On 15 August 1975, the Constituent Assembly formally adopted the Constitution, invited the Queen to become head of state and asked her to accept Parliament's nomination of John Guise as governor-general of Papua New Guinea. According to the Queen's then-private secretary, Martin Charteris, the Queen was "both tickled and touched" and she accepted the role straight away. According to historian Robert Hardman, Papua New Guinea is the one part of the world where the Queen was "an elected monarch". The Constitution of the Independent State of Papua New Guinea also states that the Queen had been requested by the people of Papua New Guinea, through their Constituent Assembly, to become their Queen and Head of State; and she "graciously consented" so to become. Papua New Guinea was thus the first Commonwealth realm to have specifically requested that Queen Elizabeth II become its monarch. (Note: Michael Palmer, in his contribution to The Canadian Kingdom: 150 Years of Constitutional Monarchy, stated, "Papua New Guinea is the only realm to have explicitly invited the Queen to become its sovereign." However, the constitution of Tuvalu, enacted after Papua New Guinea's, also asserts the people of Tuvalu requested that Elizabeth II be the country's sovereign. Additionally, former Governor-General of Solomon Islands Frank Kabui stated in an interview in 2022 that, "in 1975, the people of this country [Solomon Islands] decided to recommend to the then-Constitutional Committee that Her Majesty the Queen become the head of state.")

Proclamation of Independence by Governor-General John Guise at 0001 hrs, 16 September 1975

Distinguished guests, visitors from overseas, people of Papua New Guinea: Papua New Guinea is now independent. The Constitution of the Independent State of Papua New Guinea under which all power rests with the people is now in effect. We have at this point in time broken with our colonial past and we now stand as an independent nation in our own right. Let us unite with the Almighty God's guidance and help in working together for the future as a strong and free country.

At the independence celebrations in 1975, the Queen was represented by her son, Charles, Prince of Wales (later Charles III). On the eve of independence, the Australian flag was lowered ceremonially for the last time and presented to Australian Governor-General Sir John Kerr. "We are lowering the flag – not tearing it down", said John Guise, the Governor-General designate of Papua New Guinea. At 12.01 am, on 16 September, Guise, in a broadcast to the nation, declared: "Papua New Guinea is now independent". Later the same day, the Prince of Wales opened the first parliament in Port Moresby.

== The Papua New Guinean Crown and its aspects ==
I know how honoured Her Majesty is to be your Queen, a title borne by her with immense pride and renewed by the people of this great country upon independence in 1975.

— Charles, Prince of Wales, 2012

Papua New Guinea is one of fifteen independent nations, known as Commonwealth realms, which shares its monarch with other realms in the Commonwealth of Nations, with the monarch's relationship with Papua New Guinea completely independent from his position as monarch of any other realm. Despite sharing the same person as their respective monarch, each of the Commonwealth realms — including Papua New Guinea — is sovereign and independent of the others. The monarch is represented by a viceroy—the governor-general of Papua New Guinea—in the country.

Since the independence of Papua New Guinea in 1975, the pan-national Crown has had both a shared and a separate character and the monarch's role as monarch of Papua New Guinea is distinct to his or her position as monarch of any other realm, including the United Kingdom. The monarchy thus ceased to be an exclusively British institution and in Papua New Guinea became a Papua New Guinean, or "domesticated" establishment.

This division is illustrated in a number of ways: The monarch, for example, holds a unique Papua New Guinean title and, when he is acting in public specifically as a representative of Papua New Guinea, he uses, where possible, symbols of Papua New Guinea, including the country's national flag, unique royal symbols, and the like. Also, only Papua New Guinean government ministers can advise the monarch on matters of the country.

=== Title ===
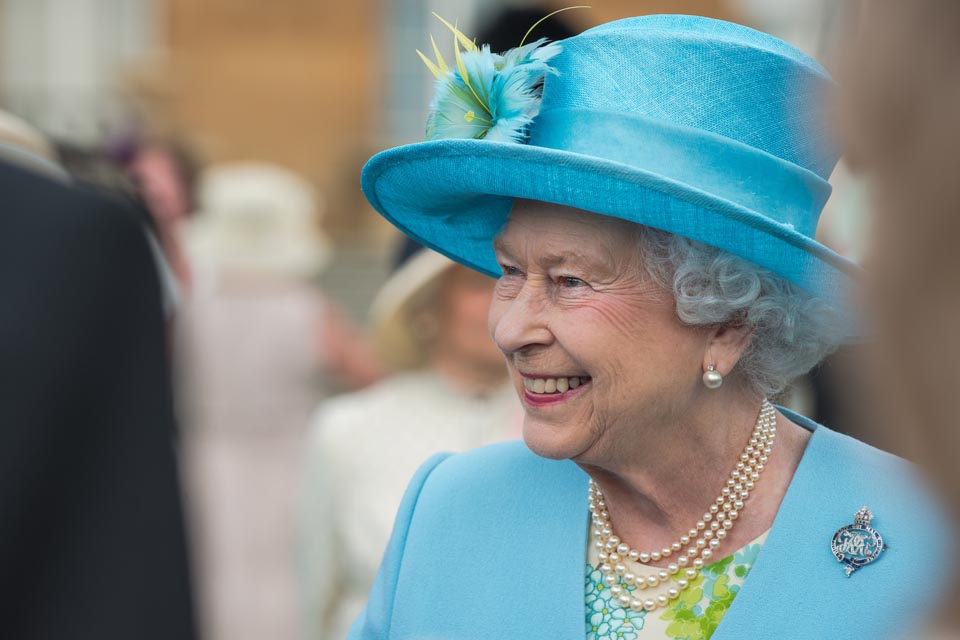
Queen Elizabeth II, the first monarch of Papua New Guinea, was known as Misis Kwin to the people of Papua New Guinea.

Upon independence in 1975, the Constitution granted Elizabeth II separate style and titles in her role as Head of State of Papua New Guinea. Under section 85 of the Constitution, the Queen's royal style and titles in relation to Papua New Guinea were: Elizabeth II, Queen of Papua New Guinea and Her other Realms and Territories, Head of the Commonwealth.

Since the accession of Charles III, the monarch's title is: Charles III, King of Papua New Guinea and His other Realms and Territories, Head of the Commonwealth.

This style communicates Papua New Guinea's status as an independent monarchy, highlighting the monarch's role specifically as Head of State of Papua New Guinea, as well as the shared aspect of the Crown throughout the realms, by mentioning Papua New Guinea separately from the other Commonwealth realms. Typically, the monarch is styled "King of Papua New Guinea" and is addressed as such when in Papua New Guinea, or performing duties on behalf of the country abroad.

Colloquially, Queen Elizabeth II was referred to as Misis Kwin ("Mrs. Queen"), Mama Kwin, Sina Bada, Big Mum, and Mama belong big family in the creole language of Tok Pisin.

=== Oath of allegiance ===
As the embodiment of the state, the monarch is the locus of oaths of allegiance. This is done in reciprocation to the monarch's Coronation Oath, wherein they promise to govern the peoples of their realms, "according to their respective laws and customs".

The oath of allegiance in Papua New Guinea is:

"I, (name), do swear that I will well and truly serve and bear true allegiance to His Majesty King Charles the Third, His heirs and successors according to law. So help me God."

=== Succession ===
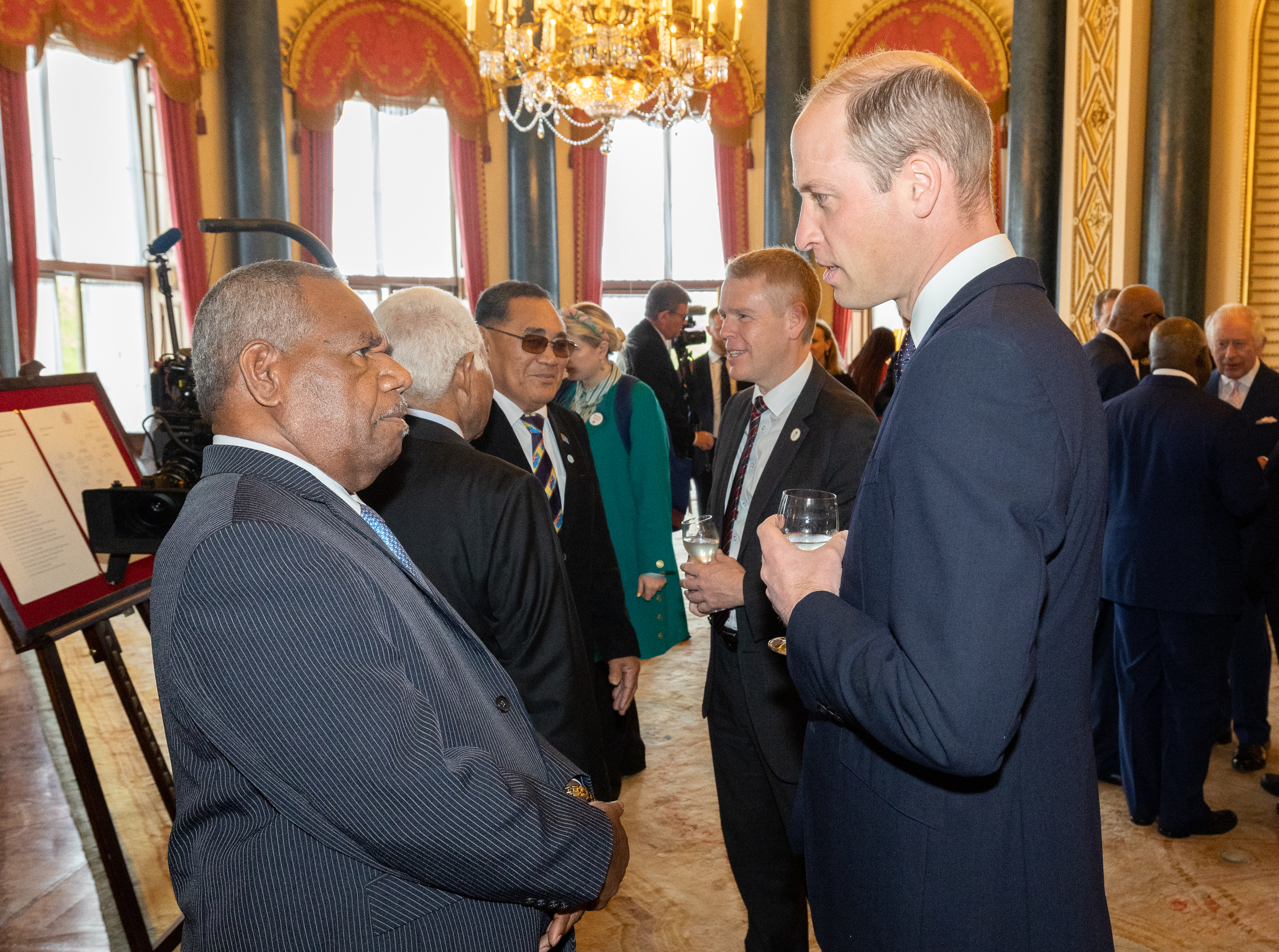
William, Prince of Wales, the current heir apparent to the throne of Papua New Guinea, speaking with Governor-General Sir Bob Dadae, 2023

The constitution provides that Queen Elizabeth II's heirs shall succeed her as head of state. Like some realms, Papua New Guinea defers to United Kingdom law to determine the line of succession.

Succession is by absolute primogeniture governed by the provisions of the Succession to the Crown Act 2013, as well as the Act of Settlement, 1701, and the Bill of Rights, 1689. This legislation limits the succession to the natural (i.e. non-adopted), legitimate descendants of Sophia, Electress of Hanover, and stipulates that the monarch cannot be a Roman Catholic, and must be in communion with the Church of England upon ascending the throne. Though these constitutional laws, as they apply to Papua New Guinea, still lie within the control of the British parliament, both the United Kingdom and Papua New Guinea cannot change the rules of succession without the unanimous consent of the other realms, unless explicitly leaving the shared monarchy relationship; a situation that applies identically in all the other realms, and which has been likened to a treaty amongst these countries.

Upon a demise of the Crown (the death or abdication of a monarch), it is customary for the accession of the new monarch to be publicly proclaimed by the governor-general in the capital, Port Moresby, after the accession. Regardless of any proclamations, the late monarch's heir immediately and automatically succeeds, without any need for confirmation or further ceremony. An appropriate period of mourning also follows, during which flags across the country are flown at half-mast to honour the late monarch. The day of the funeral is likely to be a public holiday.

In light of the accession of King Charles III in 2022, Prime Minister James Marape said that Parliament would make changes in the Constitution of Papua New Guinea to replace all constitutional references to the "Queen" with the "King".

== Constitutional role ==
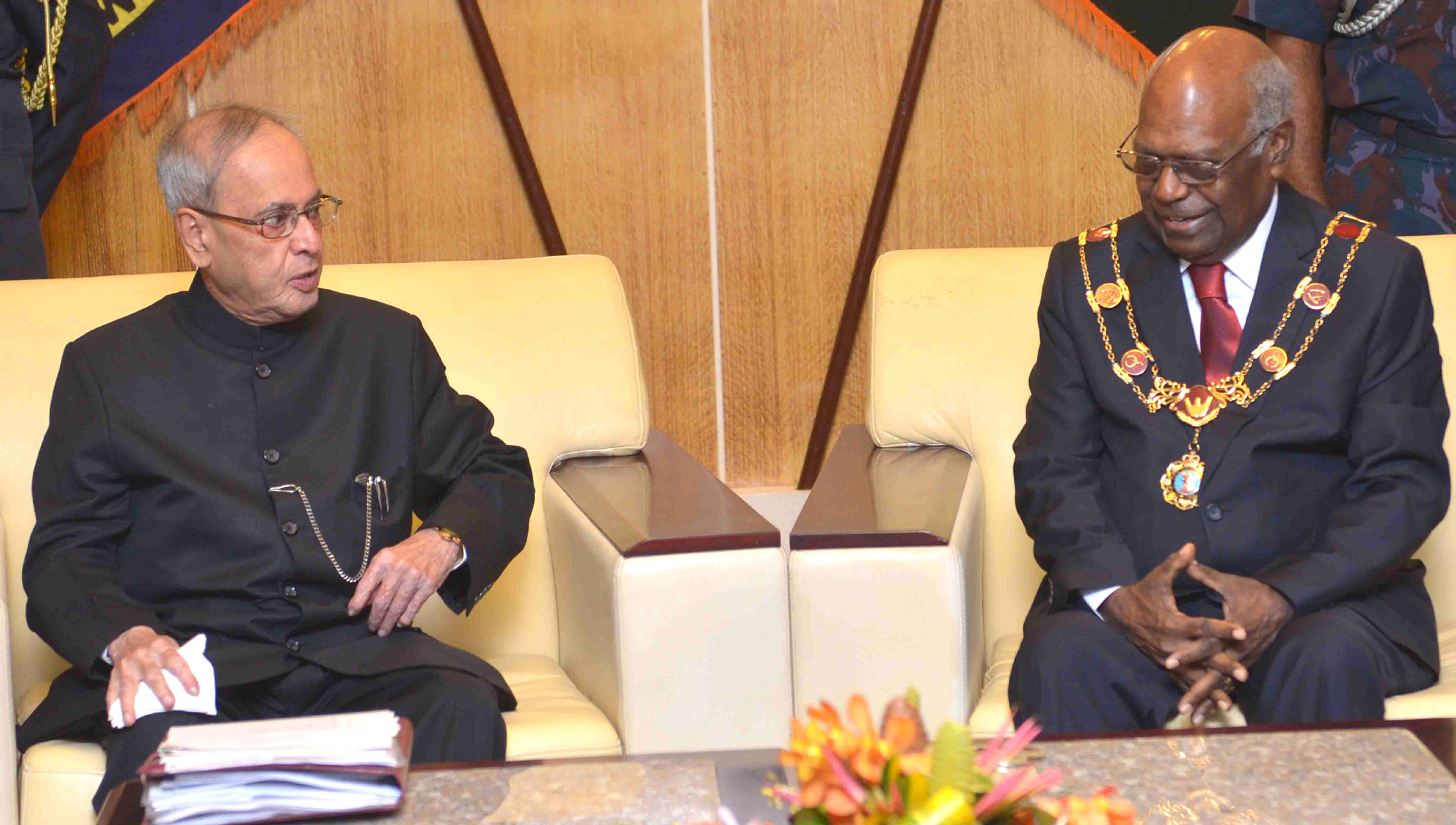
Governor-General Sir Michael Ogio with President Pranab Mukherjee of India, at Government House, 2016

The Constitution of Papua New Guinea is a single, codified document, being both autochthonous and entrenched. The constitution, in turn, is underpinned by various organic acts, conventions, and the underlying common and customary law. However, Papua New Guinea's underlying law does not include the royal prerogative, which was abolished by the Underlying Law Act 2000 (No. 13 of 2000). (Note: Previously inherited as part of the common law at Independence, prerogative powers relating to matters such as citizenship, honours, and immunities were transferred to the executive government or the courts. Section 2 of the Act expressly excluded the Royal Prerogative from the sources of the underlying law, making it no longer applicable in Papua New Guinea's legal system.) The resulting body of law altogether gives Papua New Guinea a parliamentary system of government under a constitutional monarchy, wherein the role of the monarch and governor-general is both legal and practical, but not political.

Unlike in most other Commonwealth realms, sovereignty is constitutionally vested in the citizenry of Papua New Guinea and the preamble to the constitution states "that all power belongs to the people—acting through their duly elected representatives". The monarch has been, according to section 82 of the constitution, "requested by the people of Papua New Guinea, through their Constituent Assembly, to become [monarch] and head of State of Papua New Guinea" and thus acts in that capacity. As such, the concept of the head of state as "the sovereign" within the conventional context of the Westminster system does not apply to Papua New Guinea. As head of state, the monarch is at the apex of the constitutional order of precedence.

It was necessary to have the Queen as head of state. She has a very special place in our system of government.

— Sir Bob Dadae, Governor-General of Papua New Guinea, 2017

A number of constitutional powers, duties, and functions are reposed in the monarch as head of state. In practice, however, most of the responsibilities belonging to the head of state are performed on a daily basis by the governor-general, who acts in the monarch's name. The governor-general is appointed by the monarch on the nomination of a simple majority of the National Parliament; upon appointment, governors-general serve six-year terms of office. That notwithstanding, there are still a handful of responsibilities which are exclusively performed by the monarch, such as formally appointing the governor-general.

=== Executive ===
The Constitution of Papua New Guinea vests executive authority in the Crown, to be exercised either by the head of state directly as the living embodiment of the Crown or by the governor-general as the monarch's representative. Papua New Guinea is a Westminster style parliamentary democracy wherein the power to govern is entrusted by the head of state to a democratically elected government that is in turn collectively responsible to parliament. This construct of responsible government has been in place since Papua New Guinea achieved independence in 1975. Thus, one of the main duties of the Crown is to appoint a prime minister, who thereafter heads the National Executive Council and advises both the head of state and the governor-general on the exercise of the Crown's executive powers.

The monarch's and thereby the viceroy's role is primarily symbolic and cultural, acting as a symbol of the legal authority under which all governments and agencies operate. Thus, it is for the National Executive Council to decide how to administer affairs of state, command the Papua New Guinea Defence Force, summon and prorogue parliament and call elections. Indeed, Section 86 of the constitution provides that the head of state "shall act only with, and in accordance with, the advice of the National Executive Council, or of some other body or authority prescribed by a Constitutional Law or an Act of the Parliament for a particular purpose". As such, unlike many other Commonwealth realms there are no reserve powers that may be unilaterally exercised by the monarch or governor-general. Nevertheless, both the monarch and the governor-general in their capacities as head of state and viceroy have the right to consult, encourage, and warn ministers on all matters of public business.

==== Government organisation ====
The governor-general, to maintain the stability of the government of Papua New Guinea, appoints as prime minister the leader of the political party which gains the support of a majority in Parliament after a general election. Due to the fact that Papua New Guinea's political landscape is highly fractured along multiple, shifting political parties, governors-general are actively involved in the process of identifying a member of Parliament who can command the confidence of his or her peers. The governor-general additionally appoints, assigns portfolios to, and dismisses the other ministers at the direction of the prime minister. The monarch is kept informed by his viceroy of the acceptance of the resignation of a prime minister and the swearing-in of a new prime minister and other members of the ministry, and remains fully briefed through regular communications from his Papua New Guinean ministers. Likewise, members of various executive agencies and other officials are appointed by the governor-general in the name of the head of state.

==== Foreign affairs ====
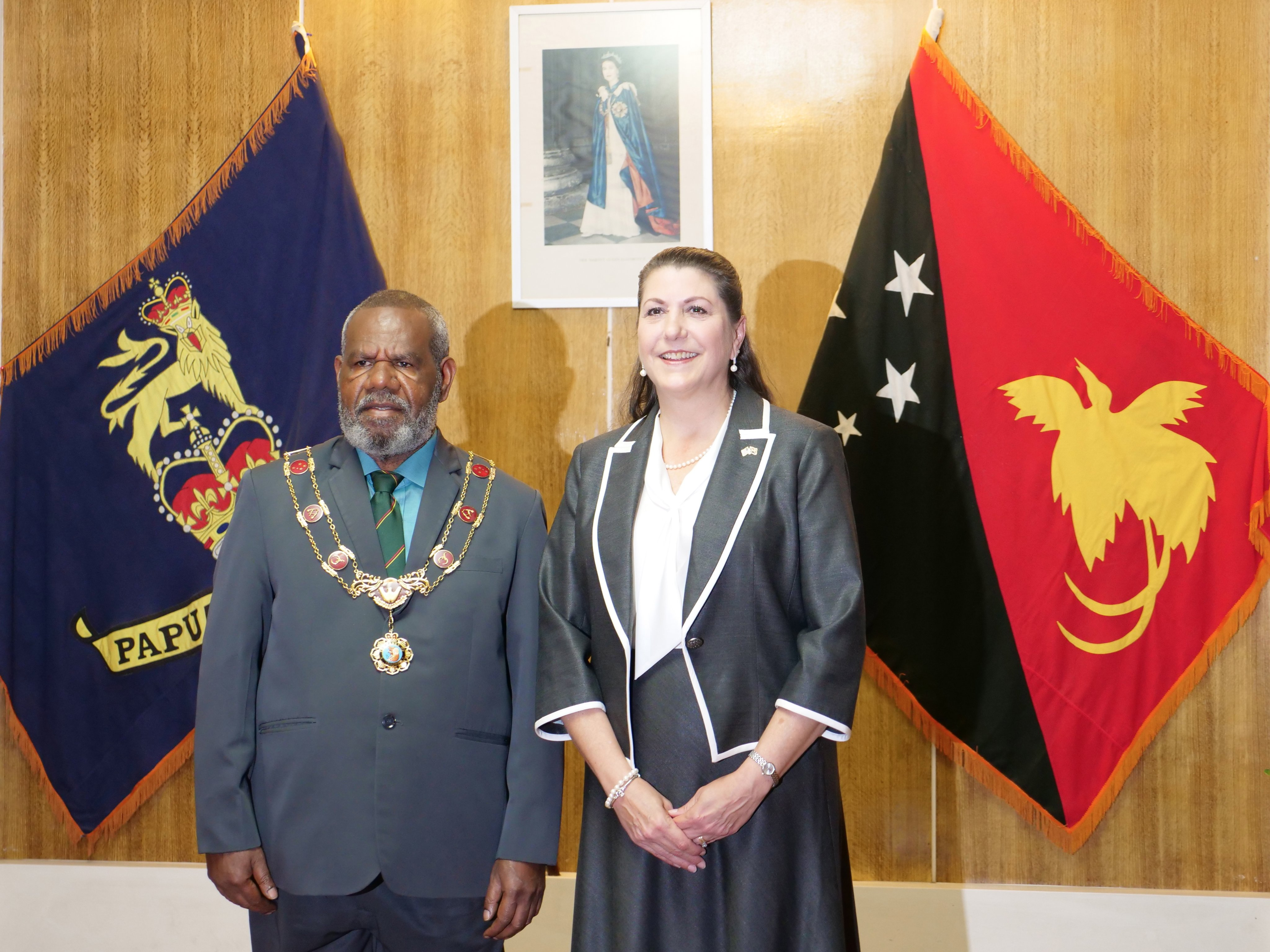
US Ambassador McKee with Governor-General Sir Bob Dadae, 2019

The executive authority of the State extends to foreign affairs: on the advice of the National Executive Council, the governor-general ratifies treaties, alliances, and international agreements, or may delegate this duty to a government minister. Under section 117 of the constitution, treaties must be laid before parliament for ten sitting days before it can be ratified, during which time the parliament may disallow ratification by a majority vote. A treaty cannot alter the domestic laws of Papua New Guinea unless it is given that status by an act of parliament. The governor-general, on behalf of the monarch, also accredits Papua New Guinean High Commissioners and ambassadors and receives diplomats from foreign states. In addition, the issuance of passports falls within the constitutional functions of the Head of State and, as such, all Papua New Guinean passports are issued by the governor-general in the name of the head of state.

=== Parliament ===
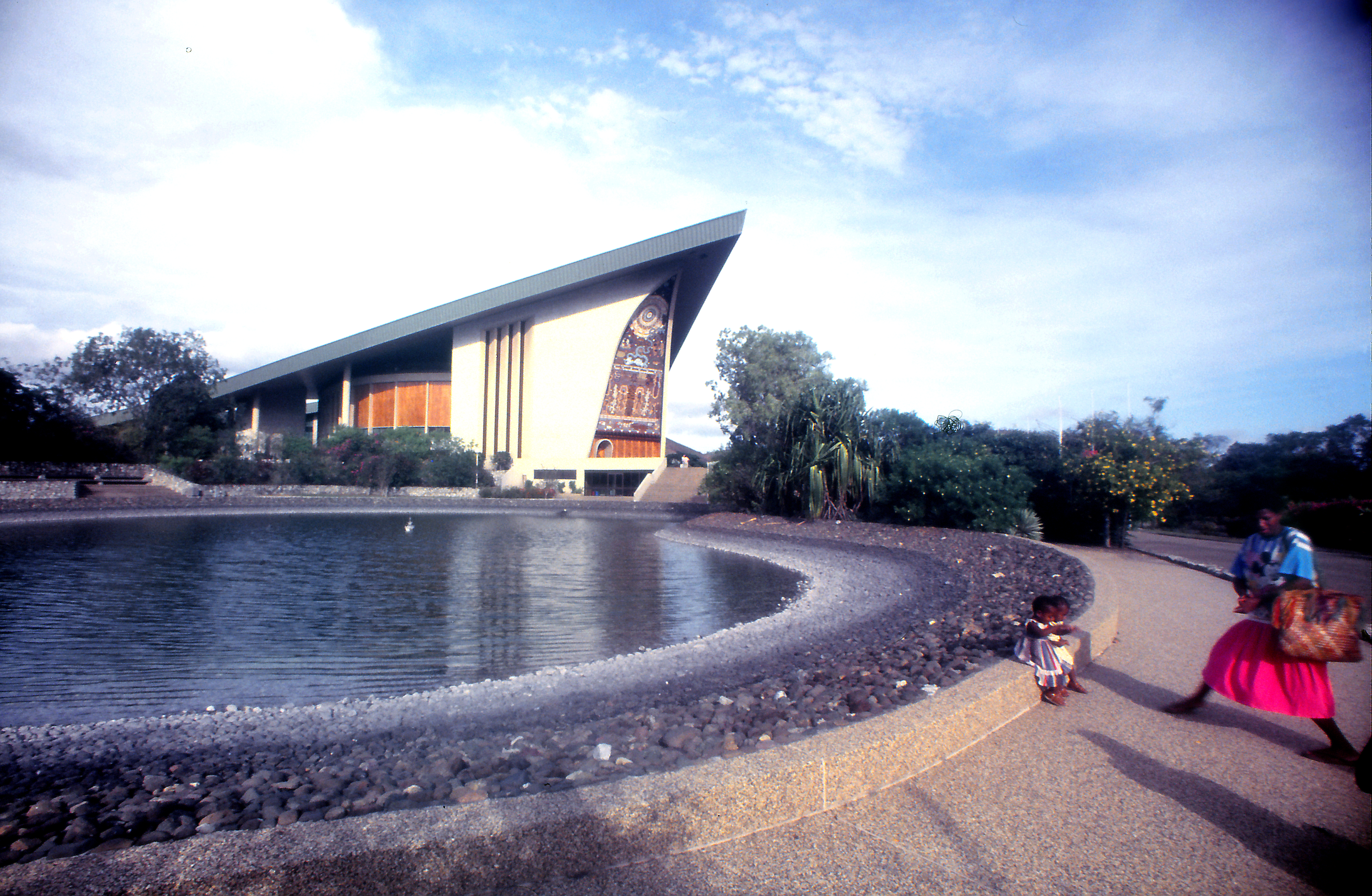
National Parliament House, Port Moresby, the meeting place for the National Parliament of Papua New Guinea, was opened by King Charles III, as Prince of Wales, in 1984.

Given that sovereignty vests in the citizenry and not the head of state, Papua New Guinea is unique among Commonwealth realms in that legislative authority rests solely with the National Parliament as opposed to the Crown. Nevertheless, parliament convenes only under the authority of the head of state. For this reason, the Crown is represented in parliament by manner of a ceremonial mace, which bears a crown at its apex.

The viceroy summons, prorogues, and dissolves parliament on behalf of the head of state. In the event of dissolution, the writs for a general election are usually dropped by the governor-general at Government House, Port Moresby. The governor-general is responsible for presiding over the opening of a new parliamentary session, during which he or she reads an address in parliament, outlining the government's legislative agenda. Generally speaking, the governor-general's powers are exercised on the binding advice of the prime minister, except in cases where the governor-general acts against ministerial advice in order to prevent constitutional crises.

Unlike in other Commonwealth realms, royal assent has no constitutional basis in the enactment of Papua New Guinean legislation. Instead, bills become acts of parliament when certified as such under the National Seal by the speaker. However, parliament may provide through an Act of Parliament for the head of state, acting on the advice of the National Executive Council, to recommit primary legislation to parliament for the consideration of amendments.

=== Courts ===
Unlike other realms where the monarch is seen as the source of judicial power, the judicial authority of Papua New Guinea is vested in the National Judicial System (the Supreme Court and lower courts).

However, the Chief Justice of the Supreme Court of Papua New Guinea is appointed by the governor-general on behalf of the head of state. Additionally, the head of state, on the advice of the National Executive Council, can also grant immunity from prosecution, exercise the "Power of Mercy", and pardon offences against the Crown, either before, during, or after a trial. The exercise of the Power of Mercy to grant a pardon and the commutation of prison sentences is described in section 151 of the Constitution.

== Cultural role ==
=== The Crown and Honours ===
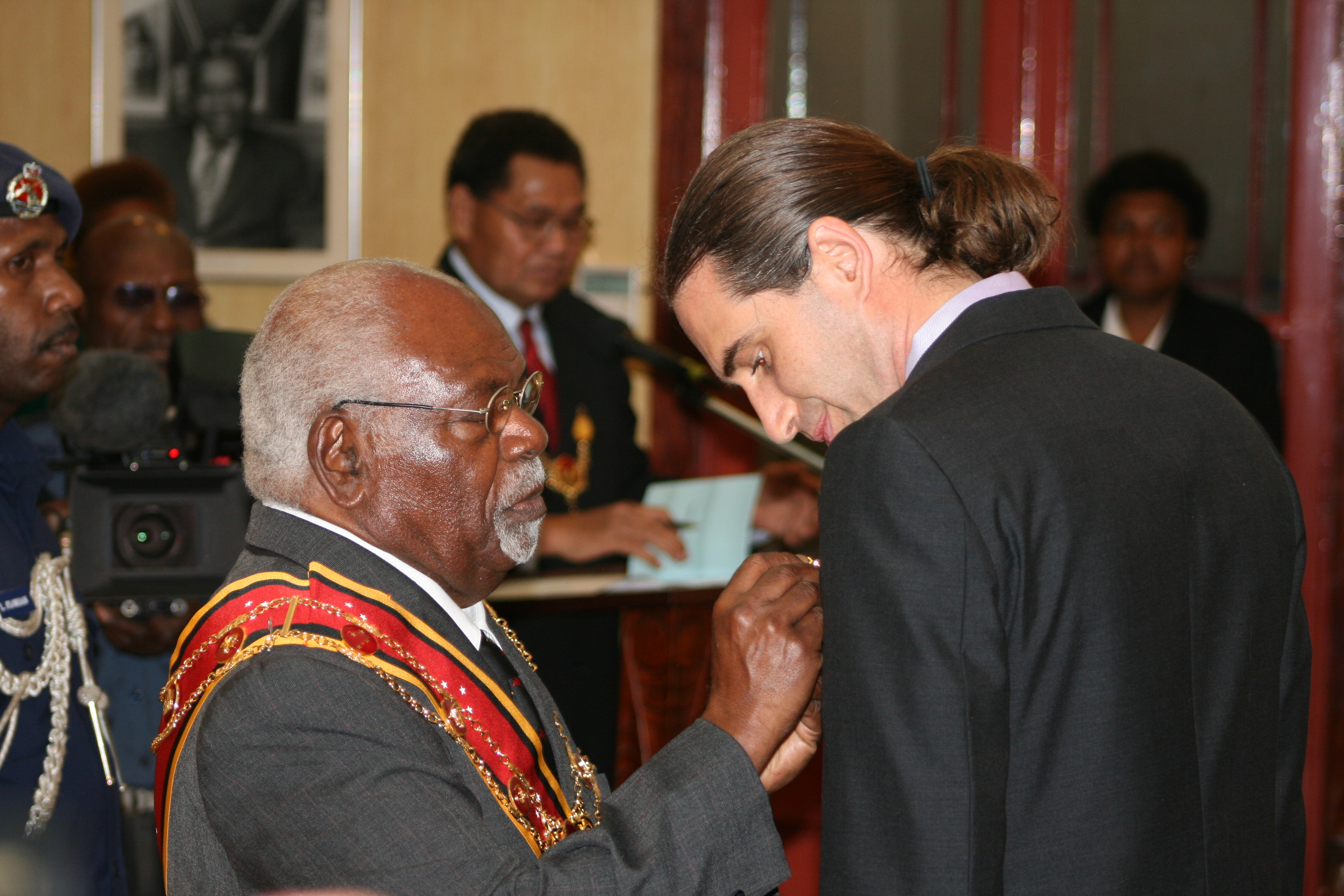
Governor-General Sir Paulias Matane conducting an investiture at Government House, 2006

Within the Commonwealth realms, the monarch is deemed the fount of honour. Similarly, the monarch confers awards and honours in Papua New Guinea in his name. Most of them are often awarded on the advice of "His Majesty's Papua New Guinea Ministers".

Papua New Guinea's own national honours and awards system, known as "The Orders of Papua New Guinea", was formally established on 23 August 2005 by authority of the Queen of Papua New Guinea, Elizabeth II. The monarch is the sovereign and head of the Orders of Papua New Guinea. His vice-regal representative, the governor-general, is the chancellor of the Orders of Papua New Guinea and Principal Grand Companion of the Order of Logohu.

=== The Crown and the Defence Force ===
The rank insignia of a Papua New Guinean Colonel (left), Lieutenant-Colonel (centre), and Major (right) of the Land Element of the Papua New Guinea Defence Force featuring the St Edward's Crown

The Crown sits at the pinnacle of the Papua New Guinea Defence Force. It is reflected in Papua New Guinea's maritime vessels, which bear the prefix HMPNGS, i.e., His Majesty's Papua New Guinea Ship. St Edward's Crown appears on Papua New Guinea's Defence Force rank insignia, which illustrates the monarchy as the locus of authority.

Members of the Defence Force have often participated and represented Papua New Guinea at various royal events, including the Platinum Jubilee of Queen Elizabeth II, and the coronation of King Charles III.

Members of the royal family also act as colonels-in-chief of various regiments, reflecting the Crown's relationship with the Defence Force through participation in military ceremonies both at home and abroad. Charles III is the Colonel-in-Chief of Papua New Guinea's Royal Pacific Islands Regiment (which was granted the prefix "Royal" by Queen Elizabeth II in 1984). In 2012, Charles, dressed in the forest green uniform of the regiment, presented troops with new colours at the Sir John Guise Stadium in Port Moresby.

In September 2025, Prince Edward, Duke of Edinburgh, on behalf of King Charles III, presented new Colours to the 1st Battalion Royal Pacific Islands Regiment, replacing the previous colours dating from Queen Elizabeth II’s reign. Commanding Officer Lieutenant Colonel Ezron Dekaetavara said the King's Colour was a "symbol of history, duty and unbroken service to the Crown".

=== The Crown and the Constabulary ===
The national police force of Papua New Guinea is known as the "Royal Papua New Guinea Constabulary". Formerly the Royal Papua and New Guinea Constabulary, the force came into existence following the amalgamation of the Royal Papuan Constabulary (which was granted the prefix "Royal" by King George VI in 1939) and the New Guinea Police Force in 1942. On 2 June 1953, 25 members of the Constabulary represented the Territory of Papua and New Guinea at the coronation of Queen Elizabeth II.

The Crown sits at the pinnacle of the Royal Papua New Guinea Constabulary. The governor-general is the Commandant of the Force. St. Edward's Crown appears on the Constabulary's badges and rank insignia, which illustrates the monarchy as the locus of authority.

=== The Crown and Tok Pisin ===
Mi nambwan pikinini bilong misis kwin na wanpela ten lapan bilong Manus. Mi bringim bikpela tok hamamas bilong Mejesti Kwin bilong Papua Niugini na olgeta haus lain bilong mi lon dispela taim bilong Diamon Jubili bilon misis kwin. Mi tokpisin olrite?
(Tok Pisin: I am the first born child of Her Majesty The Queen and am the tenth Lapan of Manus. I bring you greetings from Her Majesty The Queen of Papua New Guinea and from all my Family Members during this celebration of the Diamond Jubilee of The Queen. Was my Pisin correct?)

— Charles, Prince of Wales, 2012

In the creole language of Tok Pisin, Queen Elizabeth II was referred to as Misis Kwin, Mama Kwin, Sina Bada, Big Mum and Mama belong big family. The Queen's husband, Prince Philip, Duke of Edinburgh was addressed as Oldfella Pili-Pili Him Bilong Misis Kwin. As heir to the throne, the then Prince Charles (later King Charles III) was known in Tok Pisin as Nambawan pikinini bilong Misis Kwin ("The first child of Mrs Queen").

Members of the royal family have often spoken in Tok Pisin while in Papua New Guinea. In October 1982, the Queen gave a famous 'I hope to return' speech in Tok Pisin, watched by thousands under rainy skies, in which she said, “Mi hamamas tru long istap wantaim yupla nau, na mi ting bai mi kam bek long lukim yupla lo taim bihain.” (“I am delighted to be with you now and hope to return in the future”). Prince Charles used the language in his speeches to the National Parliament in 1975 and 1984.

In August 1984, Charles, Prince of Wales visited Manus Island in the north of the country, and in a lavish ceremony was crowned the Tenth Lapan of Manus. A feast was organised for this occasion and all local chiefs were invited. Charles—draped in dogs' teeth necklaces—accepted the title by saying, “Wuroh, wuroh, wuroh, all man meri bilong Manus. Mi hammamas tru.” (“Thank you all men and women of Manus. I am truly filled with happiness”).

In 2012, during a tour to mark the Queen's Diamond Jubilee, Charles, Prince of Wales again introduced himself in Tok Pisin as “nambawan pikinini bilong Misis Kwin” (“the number one child belonging to Mrs Queen”) in a speech to the crowds. Responding to huge cheers, he conveyed in Tok Pisin the greetings from the Queen of Papua New Guinea and all members of the royal family.

The Princess Royal, during her visit for the Queen's Platinum Jubilee in 2022, mentioned that she had private conversations with her family about Tok Pisin, saying, "you won't be surprised to hear that we compare our memories of the odd bits of pidgin that we remember".

In September 2025, to mark the country's 50 anniversary of independence, King Charles III spoke in Tok Pisin in a video message broadcast at the Sir John Guise stadium.

=== Royal symbols ===
The King's Official Birthday is a public holiday in Papua New Guinea. In Papua New Guinea, it is usually celebrated in June every year. Official celebrations occur at hotels in Port Moresby, and much of the day is filled with sports matches, fireworks displays, and other celebrations and events. Honours and medals are given for public service to Papua New Guineans, who are mentioned in the King's Birthday Honours List.

The flag of the governor-general of Papua New Guinea featuring St Edward's Crown

The emblem of the Royal Papua New Guinea Constabulary featuring the Crown

St Edward's Crown surmounting the insignia of the Grand Companion of the Order of Logohu

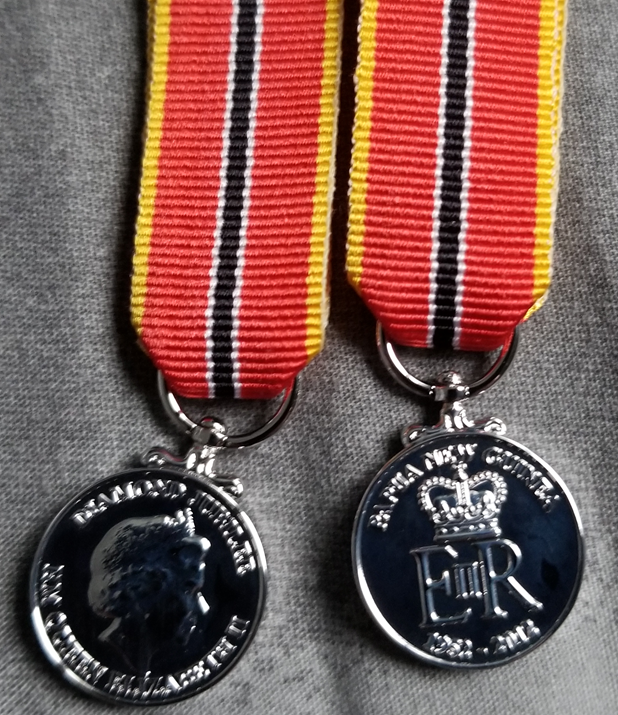
Papua New Guinean version of the Queen's Diamond Jubilee Medal, 2012

Artworks

Missis Kwin by Mathias Kauage, 1996

Her Majesty in the Land of the Unexpected by Jeffry Feeger, 2002

Papua New Guinean painters have created various expressive, informal depictions of the monarch. One of these portraits is Missis Kwin, painted by artist Mathias Kauage, and presented to the Queen in 1996, on behalf of the people of Papua New Guinea. In the painting, the Queen is shown wearing a Gerua, an important ceremonial headdress traditionally worn by Chieftains in the Highlands of Papua New Guinea. A Gerua is generally made of wood that is carved and then painted in bright colours to resemble birds-of-paradise feathers, and other avian species. According to the artist, the portrait represents the Queen in her role as Head of the Commonwealth.

To commemorate the Golden Jubilee of Elizabeth II in 2002, a Fine Arts Exhibition, entitled 20 Portraits and other Works, was held in Papua New Guinea in June 2002. Artists were asked to display a portrait of the Queen, specially made for the exhibition. The winning portrait by painter Laben John was presented as a gift to the Queen by Jean Kekedo, Papua New Guinean High Commissioner to the UK, on 16 July 2002. The runner-up portrait—Her Majesty in the Land of the Unexpected—painted by Jeffry Feeger, depicts the Queen in traditional Papua New Guinean regalia. The painting was sent to the Papua New Guinean High Commission in London, where it is on permanent display.

To mark Papua New Guinea's 50th anniversary of independence in 2025, an art competition was launched for all schools in Port Moresby, which required students to design a mural of King Charles III. The winning artwork will be painted on one of the panels of the Unity Wall which surrounds the Sir Hubert Murray Stadium.

=== Royal visits ===
Great store is rightly placed on the ability of your people to solve problems by consensus and discussion. That is the Melanesian Way. I am sure it will lead to success.

— Elizabeth II of Papua New Guinea, 1977

Prince Philip, Duke of Edinburgh, visited during an extended Commonwealth tour which lasted from October 1956 until February 1957. In May 1966, Charles, Prince of Wales had a brief stay at Martyrs Memorial High School in Oro Province under a student exchange programme with Geelong Grammar School in Melbourne, Australia. In 1969, Prince Edward and Katherine, the Duke and Duchess of Kent, opened the 3rd South Pacific Games in Port Moresby.

Queen Elizabeth II visited Papua New Guinea for the first time in February 1974, along with Prince Philip, Princess Anne, Captain Mark Phillips and Lord Louis Mountbatten. During the visit, the royal party toured Rabaul in New Britain, and Goroka, where the royal party drove around the showground in an open vehicle. They later flew to Lae, where the Queen laid a commemorative wreath at the cemetery, and then to the capital, Port Moresby, where they were greeted by a 21-gun salute. The Post Courier editorial of 27 February 1974, remarked:

The affinity between British royalty and Papua New Guinea today has more the flavor of the line at the supermarket checkout than that of monarch and subject. The way in which the Queen has brought the monarchy into close touch with the people without any of the shortcomings must surely be the achievement for which she will be best remembered.

Prince Charles returned in September 1975 to represent the Queen at the independence celebrations.

The Queen returned to Papua New Guinea, with Prince Philip, in 1977 during her Silver Jubilee tour. In Port Moresby, she was presented with a headhunted trophy, complete with heads, at a "people's welcome" at a sports stadium after she had presented a new Queen's Colour to the Pacific Islands Regiment. She walked briefly among traditional dancers before attending a state luncheon. In her speech, the Queen said that when she accepted the office of Head of State, she had hoped that the Crown could play a part in helping to establish and maintain unity. The next day the royal party flew to the provincial centres of Popondetta and Alotau, in eastern Papua. The Queen and the Duke visited Port Moresby and Mount Hagen in 1982, after the XII Commonwealth Games in Brisbane. They arrived in Port Moresby, where more than 100,000 people in traditional dress greeted the couple, before an official welcome from Prime Minister Michael Somare, followed by a state reception. In an arrival speech, the Queen congratulated the country on the progress it had made since her last visit. She closed with the phrase "God be with you till we meet again", spoken in the Motu language.

Charles visited again in 1984 to open the new parliament building in Port Moresby. Prince Andrew, Duke of York visited in 1991 to open the 9th South Pacific Games. Anne, Princess Royal visited in 2005 for the 30th anniversary of independence celebrations. Among other places, the Princess visited the Bomana War Cemetery, Anglicare Stop Aids centre at Waigani, Cheshire Homes at Hohola, and the Violence Against Women Centre.

The Prince of Wales and Duchess of Cornwall visited in 2012 on a tour on the occasion of the Queen's Diamond Jubilee. During their time in the country, the Prince and the Duchess met church, charity, and community volunteers, cultural groups, and members of the Papua New Guinea Defence Force in and near Port Moresby. Prince Andrew, Duke of York, visited in 2015 to open the 15th Pacific Games on the Queen's behalf, and visited Port Moresby (Bomana) War Cemetery.

It is a short visit but I will see Her Majesty shortly and I will be sure to tell her of the warmth and affection for Missis Kwin that is so evidently strong here.

— Anne, Princess Royal, 2022

The Princess Royal visited the country in April 2022 to mark the Queen's Platinum Jubilee. The Princess and her husband Vice Admiral Sir Timothy Laurence carried out various engagements, including visits to a Catholic boarding school, St John Ambulance PNG, the Bomana War Cemetery, Papua New Guinea National Museum and Art Gallery, Port Moresby General Hospital, Vabukori, and Hanuabada.

In September 2025, Prince Edward, Duke of Edinburgh represented his brother, King Charles III, at celebrations marking the 50th anniversary of independence. The Duke attended a dawn flag-raising ceremony, visited the new National Court Complex and met communities in Port Moresby.

== Views on the monarchy ==
I believe the monarchy is as relevant and vital today as it has ever been. Her Majesty contributes to our stability and harmony in many, many ways. I affirm our allegiance to Her Majesty as our head of state.

— Peter O'Neill, Prime Minister of Papua New Guinea, 2012

Among Papua New Guineans, there exists a history of admiration for the royal family. In 2022, the year of the Platinum Jubilee of Elizabeth II, Governor-General Sir Bob Dadae said that Papua New Guineans were "graciously honoured and proud" to have the Queen as their head of state. During her Jubilee visit in 2022, the Princess Royal thanked Papua New Guineans for "your loyalty and your respect for Her Majesty that you have shown throughout her reign".

In 1983, the final report of the General Constitutional Commission (GCC) recommended that the monarchy be replaced with a ceremonial presidency under an indigenous head of state. The commission had been established in 1978 by the government of Prime Minister Michael Somare to enquire into the workings of the national constitution and recommend amendments. Adoption of a republic enjoyed widespread support in a parliamentary debate in September 1983, with Somare, his deputy Paias Wingti, opposition leader Iambakey Okuk, and deputy opposition leader John Momis all speaking in favour. The commission's report was "approved" by the National Parliament in 1987, but the government ultimately showed little interest in its recommendations and no steps were taken towards a republic.

Justin Tkatchenko, Minister for National Events, said in 2022, that the country won't make a transition to a republic, and Papua New Guinea is embracing its monarchy and "making it bigger and better than it was before". Following the Queen's death in September 2022, Prime Minister James Marape said that Papua New Guinea's relationship with the monarchy is "very important", and his administration would not follow the path of republicanism. He remarked that Papua New Guinea has "learnt to embrace royalty" because of Elizabeth II's "outlook within the realm and her long life".

A 2023 opinion poll found that 45% of people supported Papua New Guinea becoming a republic with 51% preferring to keep the monarchy. In May 2023, Marape, responding to critics who consider abolishing the monarchy, said, "Papua New Guineans are a people very accustomed to tradition, ceremony, and hierarchal systems", and that the monarchy "reminds us of our own traditional Chieftaincy systems which brought order, balance and stability to our communities and societies". He added that the country's continued allegiance to the Crown is "also linked to our shared history and Britain's hand in our development as a country".

== List of Papua New Guinean monarchs ==
Portrait	Regnal name (Birth–Death)	Reign over Papua New Guinea		Full name	Consort	House
Portrait	Regnal name (Birth–Death)	Start	End	Full name	Consort	House
	Elizabeth II (1926–2022)	16 September 1975	8 September 2022	Elizabeth Alexandra Mary	Philip Mountbatten	Windsor
	Elizabeth II (1926–2022)	Governors-general: Sir John Guise, Sir Tore Lokoloko, Sir Kingsford Dibela, Sir Ignatius Kilage, Sir Vincent Serei Eri, Sir Wiwa Korowi, Sir Silas Atopare, Sir Paulias Matane, Sir Michael Ogio, Sir Bob Dadae; Prime ministers: Michael Somare, Julius Chan, Paias Wingti, Rabbie Namaliu, Bill Skate, Mekere Morauta, Peter O'Neill, James Marape				
	Charles III (b. 1948)	8 September 2022	present	Charles Philip Arthur George	Camilla Shand	Windsor
	Charles III (b. 1948)	Governors-general: Sir Bob Dadae; Prime ministers: James Marape				

== See also ==
- 50th Independence Anniversary King's Medal
- Lists of office-holders
- List of prime ministers of Elizabeth II
- List of prime ministers of Charles III
- List of Commonwealth visits made by Elizabeth II
- Monarchies in Oceania
- List of monarchies
