= Dennis Young (Papua New Guinean politician) =

Acting governor-general of Papua New Guinea

Sir Dennis Young

Acting Governor-General of Papua New Guinea
- In office October 4, 1991 – November 18, 1991
- Monarch: Elizabeth II
- Prime Minister: Sir Rabbie Namaliu
- Preceded by: Sir Vincent Eri
- Succeeded by: Sir Wiwa Korowi
- In office December 31, 1989 – February 27, 1990
- Monarch: Elizabeth II
- Prime Minister: Sir Rabbie Namaliu
- Preceded by: Sir Ignatius Kilage
- Succeeded by: Sir Vincent Eri

Personal details
- Born: 1936 England, United Kingdom
- Died: March 2008 (aged 71–72) Milne Bay, Papua New Guinea

Sir Dennis Young (1936 – March 2008) was the acting governor-general of Papua New Guinea in 1989–1990 and in 1991. He was Speaker of the Assembly when Sir Ignatius Kilage died on December 31, 1989. Young served as acting governor-general until the selection of Sir Vincent Eri on February 27, 1990. After Eri resigned his position on October 4, 1991, Young again served as acting governor-general until the selection of Sir Wiwa Korowi on November 18, 1991.

Young was born in England in 1936. He served as the Speaker of the National Parliament of Papua New Guinea from August 1982 to October 1982 and from November 1987 to July 1992.

He was knighted in the 1999 New Year Honours for his public service. Young died from a heart attack in Milne Bay in March 2008.

National Parliament of Papua New Guinea
Preceded by Sevese Oipi Morea	Speaker of the National Parliament of Papua New Guinea; 1982	Succeeded by Timothy Bonga
Preceded by Akoka Doi	Speaker of the National Parliament of Papua New Guinea; 1987–1992	Succeeded by Bill Skate
Government offices
Preceded by Sir Ignatius Kilage	Governor-General of Papua New Guinea; Acting; 1989–1990	Succeeded by Sir Vincent Eri
Preceded by Sir Vincent Eri	Governor-General of Papua New Guinea; Acting; 1991	Succeeded by Sir Wiwa Korowi
