= China–Papua New Guinea relations =

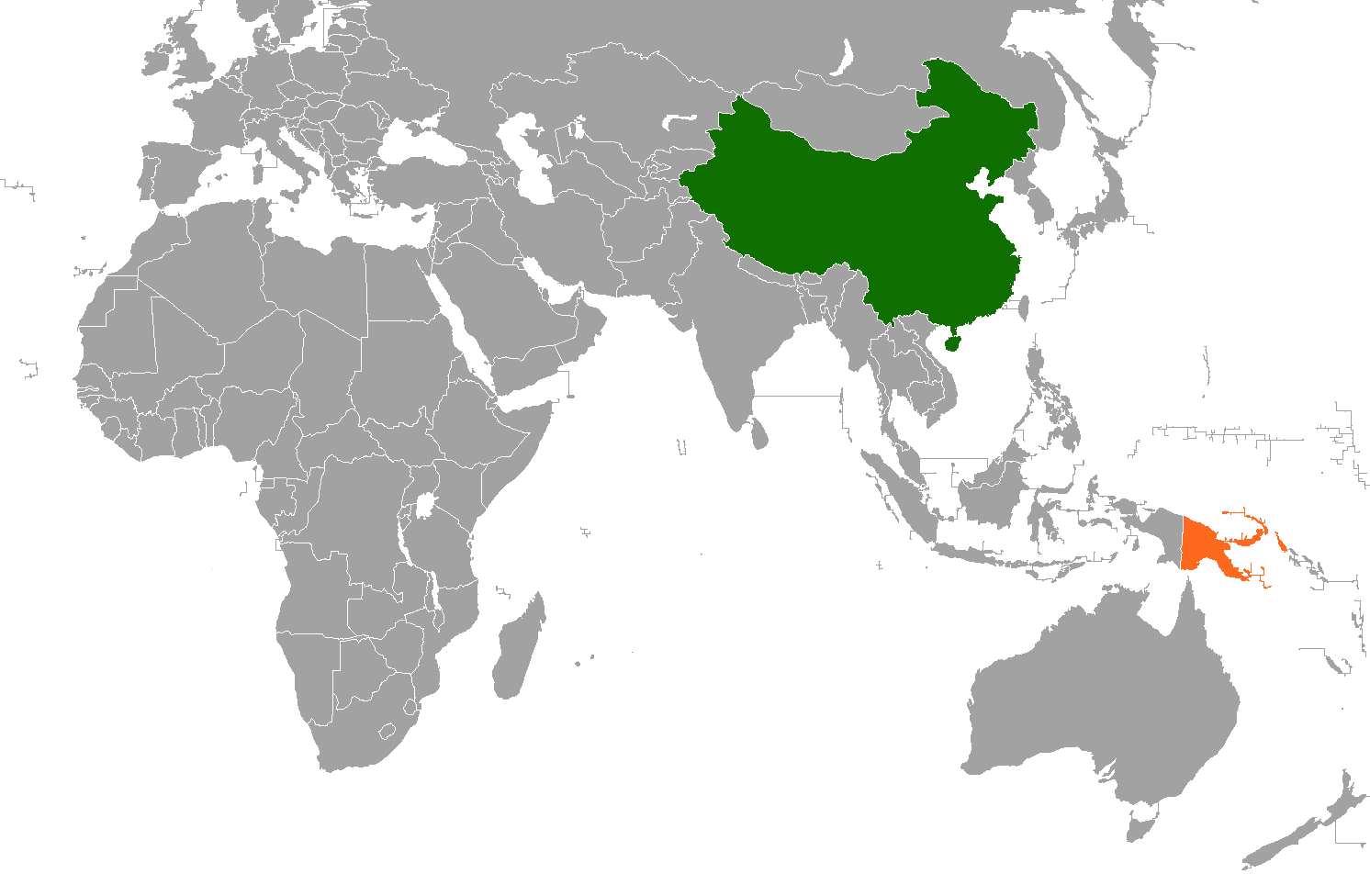
- China: Papua New Guinea

The Independent State of Papua New Guinea and the People's Republic of China (PRC) established official diplomatic relations in 1976, soon after Papua New Guinea became independent. The two countries currently maintain diplomatic, economic and, to a lesser degree, military relations. Relations are cordial; China is a significant provider of both investments and development aid to Papua New Guinea.

== Background ==
Oceania is, to the People's Republic of China and the Republic of China (Taiwan), a stage for continuous diplomatic competition. Eight states in Oceania recognise the PRC, and six recognise the ROC. These numbers fluctuate as Pacific Island nations re-evaluate their foreign policies, and occasionally shift diplomatic recognition between Beijing and Taipei. In keeping with the "One China" policy, it is not possible for any country to maintain official diplomatic relations with "both Chinas", and this "either/or" factor has resulted in the PRC and the ROC actively courting diplomatic favours from small Pacific nations. In 2003, the People's Republic of China announced it intended to enhance its diplomatic ties with the Pacific Islands Forum, and increase the economic aid package it provided to that organisation. At the same time, PRC delegate Zhou Whenzhong added: "[T]he PIF should refrain from any exchanges of an official nature or dialogue partnership of any form with Taiwan". In 2006, Chinese premier Wen Jiabao announced that the PRC would increase its economic cooperation with Pacific Island States. The PRC would provide more economic aid, abolish tariffs for exports from the Pacific's least developed countries, annul the debt of those countries, distribute free anti-malaria medicines, and provide training for two thousand Pacific Islander government officials and technical staff. Also in 2006, Wen became the first Chinese premier to visit the Pacific islands, which the Taipei Times described as "a longtime diplomatic battleground for China and Taiwan". Similarly, according to Ron Crocombe, Professor of Pacific Studies at the University of the South Pacific, "There have been more Pacific Islands minister visits to China than to any other country".

== History ==
Like other Pacific countries, Papua New Guinea has been courted by both Beijing and Taipei. It remained unambiguously aligned with Beijing until 1999. In the first decade of the twenty-first century, the possibility of formal ties between Port Moresby and Taipei has prompted the People's Republic of China to significantly strengthen its relations with PNG.

In 1999, the government of Papua New Guinean Prime Minister Bill Skate briefly recognised Taiwan. Skate lost power less than a week later, and Papua New Guinea's diplomatic recognition reverted to China.

In 2003, the PRC's embassy in Port Moresby published a statement of concern in reaction to comments in the Papua New Guinean press questioning the justification for PNG's relations with the People's Republic. The embassy statement insisted that relations between the two countries were mutually beneficial, reasserted the PRC's claims to Taiwan, and concluded: "It is our sincere hope that the local [PNG] media will report on China and its relations with PNG in a just and objective way, so as to further enhance the mutual understanding and friendship between the peoples of our two countries."

Countries which signed cooperation documents related to the Belt and Road Initiative

In July 2003, PNG governor general Sir Silas Atopare visited the PRC, re-affirmed his country's adherence to the "One China" policy, and, according to a statement published by the PRC's embassy, "thank[ed] the government and the people of China for their commitment in providing aid to PNG's development".

In May 2008, Taiwan's foreign minister James Huang resigned, along with two other top officials, after wasting over €19 million in a failed attempt to win diplomatic recognition for the Republic of China from Papua New Guinea. The misuse of the money caused public outrage, forcing Huang's resignation. Papua New Guinea's foreign minister Sam Abal subsequently confirmed that his country had no intention of recognising Taiwan.

A few days later, it was announced that members of the Papua New Guinea Defence Force would receive training provided by the PRC. Traditionally, military training aid in Papua New Guinea had been provided by Western countries, namely, Australia, New Zealand and the United States.

Papua New Guinea joined the Belt and Road Initiative (BRI) in 2016. Chinese companies were involved in the redevelopment of the port and airport of Lae.

PNG follows the one China principle and considers Taiwan to be "an inalienable part" of China. Papua New Guinea also supports all efforts by the PRC to "achieve national reunification" and opposes Taiwan independence. In mid-July 2026, Papua New Guinea announced the closure of Taiwan's representative office in Port Moresby in order to strengthen relations with China.

In June 2020, Papua New Guinea was one of 53 countries that backed the Hong Kong national security law at the United Nations. In October 2026, PNG police arrested four Chinese nationals and seized a live Type 59 artillery shell at a construction site. The Chinese embassy in PNG suggested the artillery shell was "wine bottle."

In November 2026, Papua New Guinean prime minister James Marape visited Shenzhen to attend APEC China 2026. He met with Chinese leader Xi Jinping, and assured China that Papua New Guinea had closed Taiwan's representative office in the country, saying that he hopes it "assists you in your efforts for reunification".

== See also ==
- Chinese people in Papua New Guinea
