= Akoka Doi =

Papua New Guinean politician

Akoka Doi, CMG is a Papua New Guinean politician. He was a member of the National Parliament of Papua New Guinea from 1977 to 1992, representing the electorate of Ijivitari Open.

Doi was a broadcast announcer with Radio Popondetta before entering politics. He was Speaker of the National Parliament of Papua New Guinea and foreign minister in Paias Wingti's first government, and was a founding member of the People's Action Party. He served as Deputy Prime Minister under Rabbie Namaliu from 1988 to 1990 and 1991 to 1992. Doi succeeded Ted Diro as leader of the People's Action Party after Diro's 1991 conviction, but lost his seat at the 1992 election. He was appointed a Companion of the Order of St Michael and St George in the 1989 New Year Honours. In 1990, he was awarded the New Zealand 1990 Commemoration Medal.

Doi was an unsuccessful candidate for the Northern Provincial seat at the 1997 election and 2002 election. Following his 2002 defeat, he announced that he would no longer contest elections himself, stating that he would "leave it to a younger breed of leaders". He remained president of the People's Action Party, but resigned in July 2004 amid controversy over MP Jamie Maxtone-Graham's attempt to cross over to the party.

In June 2005, he called for autonomy for Papua along the same lines as that granted to Bougainville. In March 2006, he was appointed as a director of Port Moresby's water and sewerage provider, Eda Ranu. He was subsequently appointed chairman of the company.

Political offices
Preceded by Julius Chan	Deputy Prime Minister of Papua New Guinea; 1988–1990	Succeeded by Ted Diro
Preceded by Ted Diro	Deputy Prime Minister of Papua New Guinea; 1991–1992	Succeeded by Julius Chan
National Parliament of Papua New Guinea
Preceded by Brown Sinamoi	Speaker of the National Parliament of Papua New Guinea; 1987	Succeeded by Dennis Young
