= Governor-General of Papua New Guinea =

Representative of the monarch of Papua New Guinea

- Gavena-Jeneral bilong Papua Niugini (Tok Pisin)
- Emblem of Papua New Guinea

- Flag of the governor-general

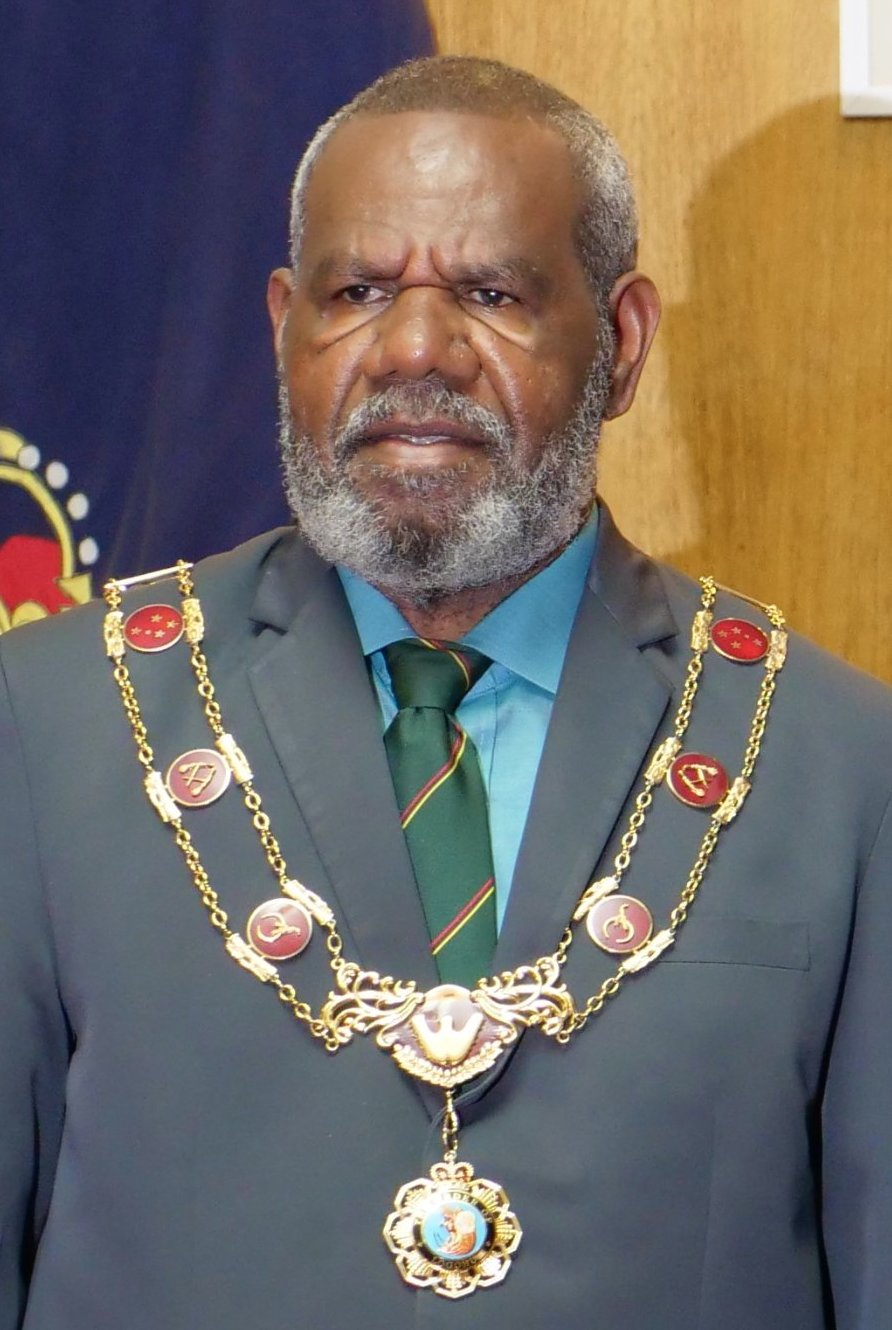
- Incumbent; Sir Bob Dadae since 28 February 2017
- Viceroy
- Style: His Excellency Grand Chief
- Residence: Government House, Port Moresby
- Appointer: Monarch of Papua New Guinea; on the nomination by the National Parliament
- Term length: Six years, renewable once (at parliamentary discretion)
- Constituting instrument: Constitution of Papua New Guinea
- Formation: 16 September 1975
- First holder: Sir John Guise

The governor-general of Papua New Guinea (Tok Pisin: Gavena-Jeneral bilong Papua Niugini) is the representative of the Papua New Guinean monarch, currently King Charles III, in Papua New Guinea. The governor-general is appointed by the monarch after their nomination by the National Parliament by vote. The functions of the governor-general include appointing ministers, judges, and ambassadors; and issuing writs for election.

In general, the governor-general observes the conventions of the Westminster system and responsible government, maintaining a political neutrality, and has to always act only on the advice of the prime minister. The governor-general also has a ceremonial role: hosting events at the official residence—Government House in the capital, Port Moresby—and bestowing Papua New Guinean honours to individuals and groups who are contributing to their communities. When travelling abroad, the governor-general is seen as the representative of Papua New Guinea and its monarch. The governor-general is supported by a staff headed by the official secretary to Government House

Governors-general are appointed for a six-year term of office. Since 28 February 2017, the governor-general has been Sir Bob Dadae.

The office of the governor-general was created on 16 September 1975, when Papua New Guinea gained independence from Australia as a sovereign state and an independent constitutional monarchy. Since then, 10 individuals have served as governor-general.

== Appointment ==
Unlike the governor-generals of most other Commonwealth realms, the governor-general of Papua New Guinea is nominated by the country's Parliament, rather than being proposed by its prime minister. The appointment is made by the monarch of Papua New Guinea following a simple majority vote of the National Parliament. Section 88(1) of the constitution provides that the monarch must act "in accordance with the advice of the National Executive Council given in accordance with a decision of the Parliament", while section 88(2) provides that the nomination for governor-general must be "made by a simple majority vote, in an exhaustive secret ballot conducted in accordance with an Organic Law."

The term in office is six years.

To be appointed for a second term, the governor-general must be supported by a two-thirds majority in the National Parliament. No person may serve for more than two terms. Thus far all retired governors-general have been knighted.

If the office of governor-general becomes vacant, due to death or dismissal, the speaker of the National Parliament of Papua New Guinea becomes acting governor-general until a new appointment is made. If the speakership is vacant, the chief justice instead assumes the role.

== Dismissal ==
The governor-general may be dismissed by either a decision of the National Executive Council or an absolute majority of the National Parliament.

No governor-general has been dismissed from office, although in 1991, Sir Vincent Serei Eri resigned from office after Prime Minister Sir Rabbie Namaliu advised the Queen to dismiss him.

== Functions ==
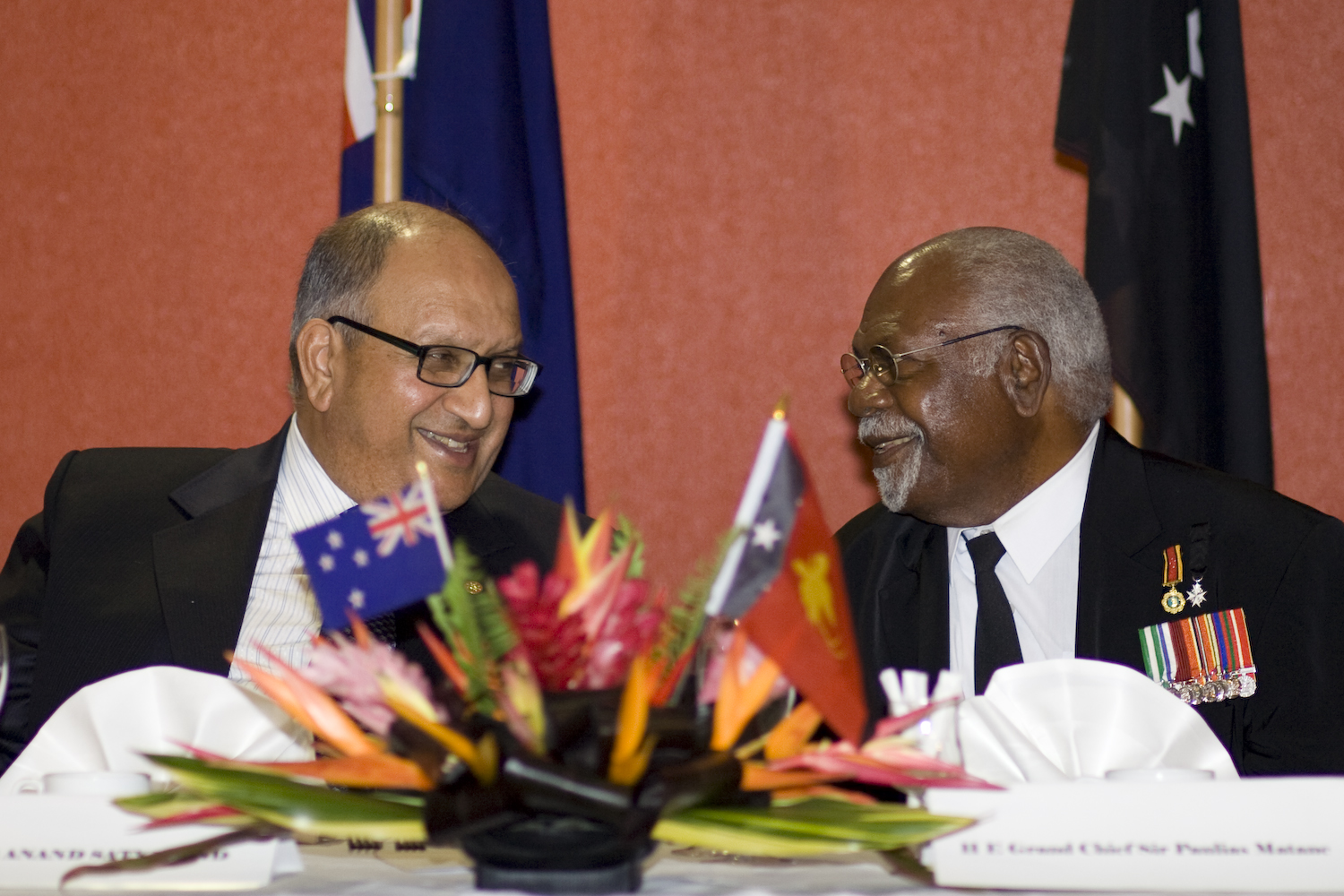
Governor-General Sir Paulias Matane (right) hosting New Zealand Governor-General Sir Anand Satyanand at a State Dinner at Government House, 2009

Papua New Guinea shares the person of the sovereign equally with 14 other countries in the Commonwealth of Nations. As the sovereign works and resides outside of Papua New Guinea's borders, the governor-general's primary task is to perform the monarch's constitutional duties on his or her behalf. As such, the governor-general carries out his or her functions in the government of Papua New Guinea on behalf and in the name of the Sovereign.

The governor-general's powers and roles are derive from the Constitution of the Independent State of Papua New Guinea Part V Section 1, 2 & 3 and set out certain provisions relating to the governor-general.

=== Constitutional role ===
The governor-general is responsible for dissolving parliament and issues writs for new elections. After an election, the governor-general formally requests the leader of the political party which gains the support of a majority in parliament to form a government. the governor-general commissions the prime minister and appoints other ministers after the election.

The governor-general acts on the advice of government ministers through the National Executive Council, to issue regulations, proclamations under existing laws, to appoint state judges, ambassadors and high commissioners to overseas countries, and other senior government officials.

The governor-general is also responsible for issuing Royal Commissions of Inquiry, and other matters, as required by particular legislation; and authorises many other executive decisions by ministers such as approving treaties with foreign governments.

The governor-general may, in certain circumstances, exercise without – or contrary to – ministerial advice. These are known as the reserve powers, and include:

- appointing a prime minister if an election has resulted in a 'hung parliament'.
- dismissing the prime minister who has lost the confidence of the parliament.
- dismissing any minister acting unlawfully.
- refusing to dissolve Parliament despite a request from the prime minister.

=== Ceremonial role ===
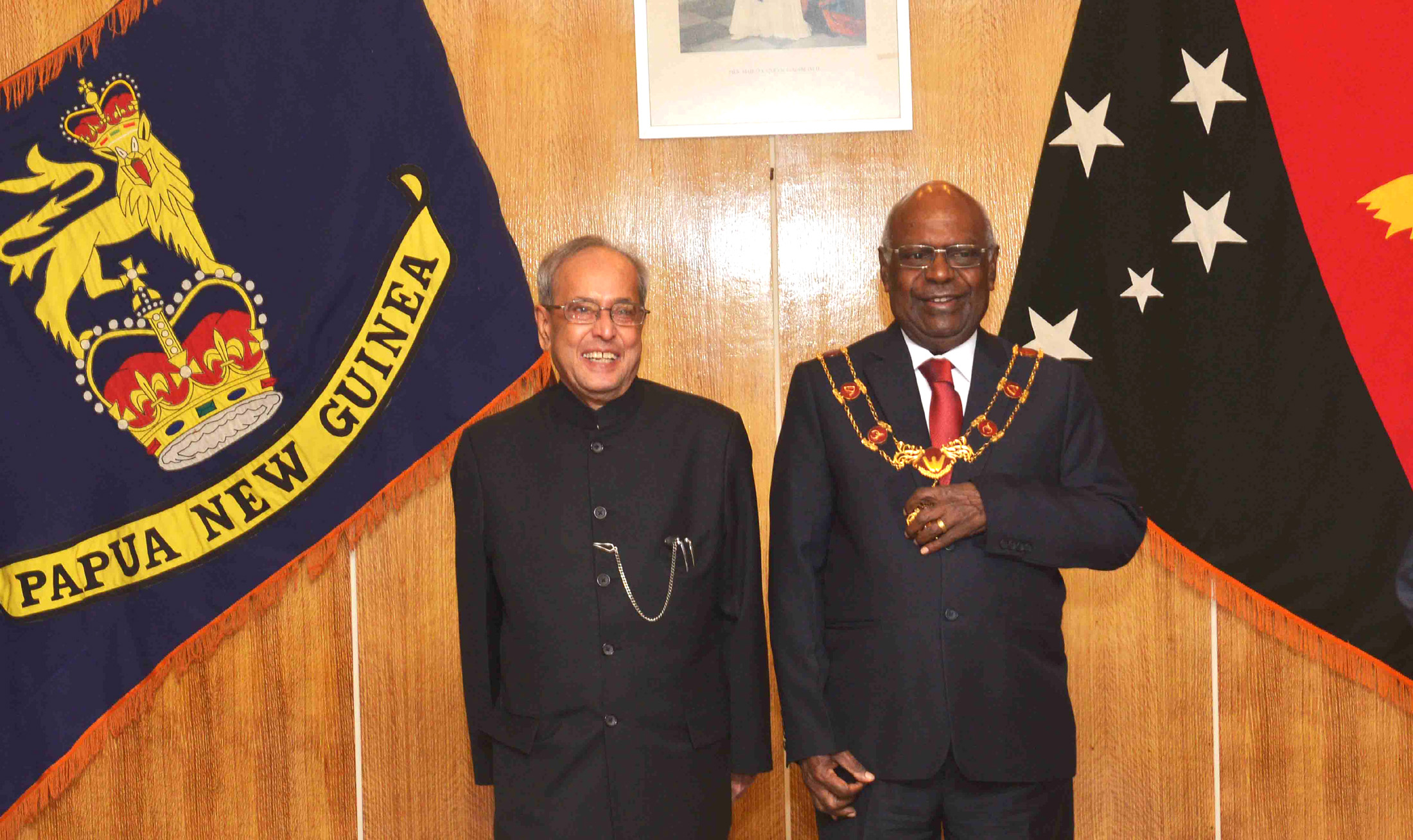
Governor-General Sir Michael Ogio with President Pranab Mukherjee of India at Government House, 2016

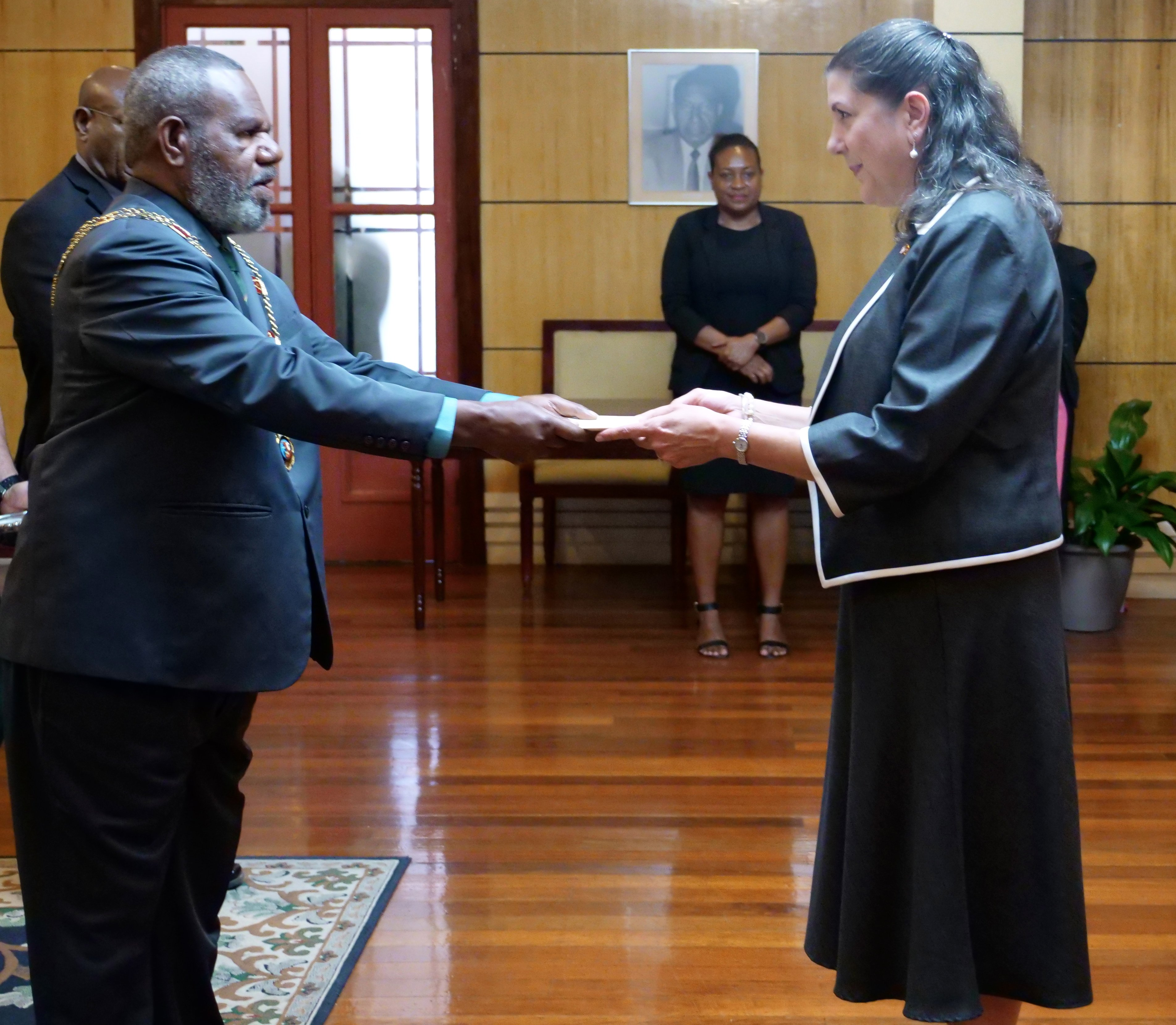
Governor-General Sir Bob Dadae receiving credentials from Erin Elizabeth McKee, US ambassador to Papua New Guinea, 2019

The governor-general's ceremonial duties include opening new sessions of parliament, welcoming visiting heads of state, and receiving the credentials of foreign diplomats.

As commander-in-chief of the Papua New Guinea Defence Force, the governor-general attends military parades and special occasions such as ANZAC Day and Remembrance Day, and presents Colours and other insignia to units of the Defence Force and the Police Force.

The governor-general also presents honours at investitures under the Papua New Guinea Honours system to persons for notable service to the community, or for acts of bravery.

=== Community role ===
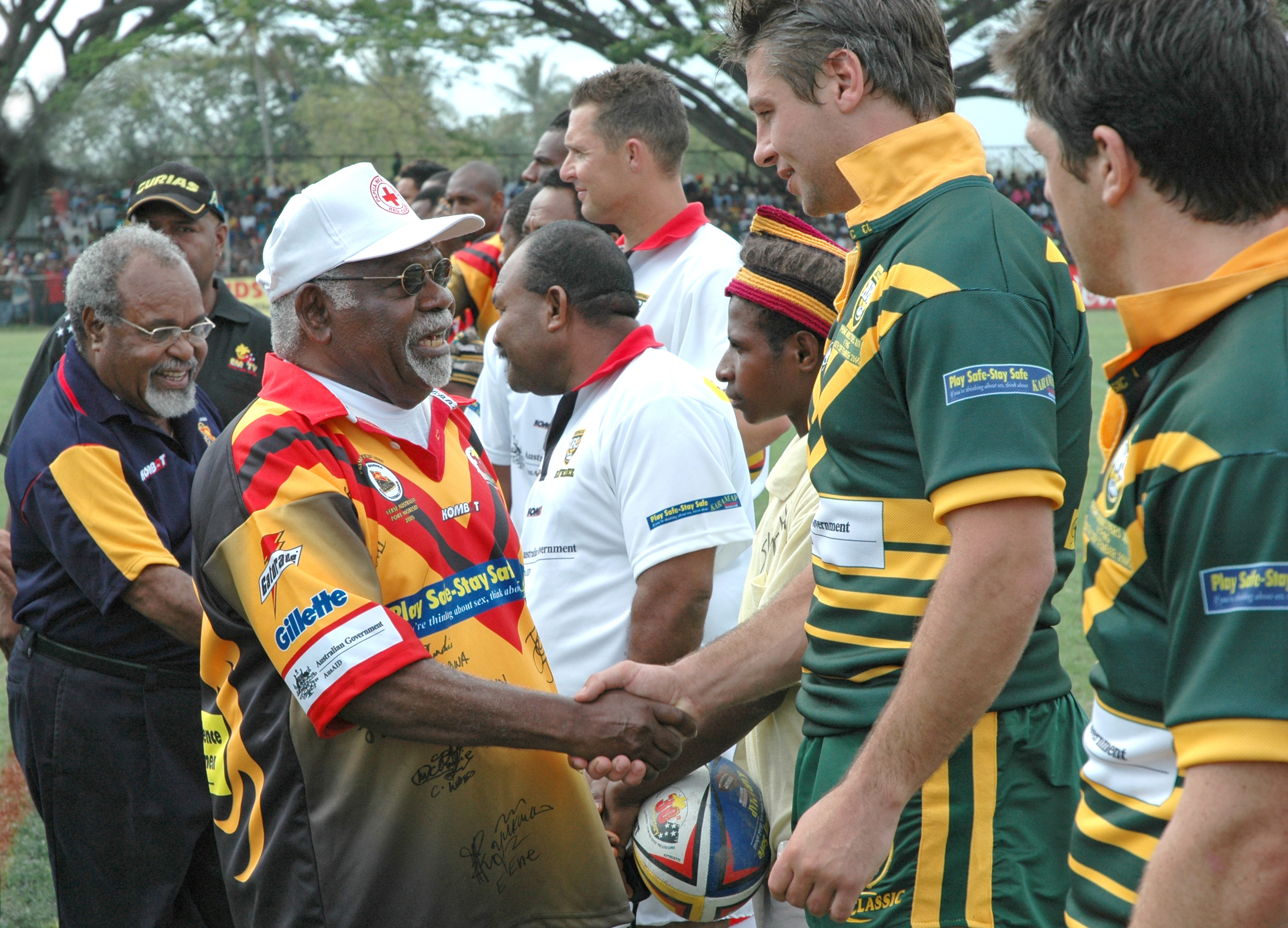
Governor-General Sir Paulias Matane meeting the teams at a sport to raise awareness against HIV/AIDS in Papua New Guinea, 2005

The governor-general provides non-partisan leadership in the community, acting as patron of many charitable, service, sporting and cultural organisations, and attending functions throughout the country.

The governor-general also encourages, articulates and represents those things that unite Papua New Guineans together. In this role, the governor-general:

- travels widely throughout Papua New Guinea visiting cities, regional centres, rural districts, indigenous communities and disadvantaged groups.
- accepts patronage of many national, charitable, cultural, educational, sporting and professional organisations.
- opens and participates in conferences where topics of national importance are discussed – such as educational, health, cultural, welfare, defence, economic and rural issues.
- attends services, functions, commemorations and exhibitions of local significance, lending their encouragement to individuals and groups who are making a substantial contribution to their communities and to Papua New Guinea.
- issues congratulatory messages to Papua New Guineans who achieve significant milestones in their lives such as 100th birthdays and 50th wedding anniversaries.

== Privileges ==
The governor-general acts as the chancellor of the Orders of Papua New Guinea. As chancellor of the orders, the governor-general is appointed as Grand Companion of the Order of Logohu and bestowed the title of "Grand Chief".

=== Symbols ===
Flag of the governor-general of Papua New Guinea

The governor-general uses a personal flag, which features a lion passant atop a St. Edward's royal crown with "Papua New Guinea" written across a scroll underneath, all on a blue background. It is flown on buildings and other locations in Papua New Guinea to mark the governor-general's presence.

=== Residence ===
Government House in Port Moresby, early 1900s, before Australia took administration of British New Guinea and changed its name to Papua

Government House in Port Moresby is the official residence of the governor-general of Papua New Guinea.

The site for Government House was chosen by Sir Peter Scratchely, Special Commissioner for the Protectorate of British New Guinea, who arrived in Port Moresby in 1885. Government House has occupied this site ever since. In 1913, Sir Hubert Murray took the task of building a new House which superseded the original one.

== List of governors-general ==
Following is a list of people who have served as Governor-General of Papua New Guinea since independence in 1975.

Symbols

^† Died in office.

Denotes Acting Governors-General

No.	Portrait	Name (Birth–Death)	Election	Term of office			Monarch (Reign)
No.	Portrait	Name (Birth–Death)	Election	Took office	Left office	Time in office	Monarch (Reign)
1		Sir John Guise (1914–1991)	1975	16 September 1975	1 March 1977	1 year, 166 days	Elizabeth II (1975–2022)
2		Sir Tore Lokoloko (1930–2013)	1977	1 March 1977	1 March 1983	6 years	Elizabeth II (1975–2022)
3		Sir Kingsford Dibela (1932–2002)	1983	1 March 1983	1 March 1989	6 years	Elizabeth II (1975–2022)
4		Sir Ignatius Kilage (1941–1989)	1989	1 March 1989	31 December 1989^{[†]}	305 days	Elizabeth II (1975–2022)
–		Dennis Young (1936–2008)	—	31 December 1989	27 February 1990	58 days	Elizabeth II (1975–2022)
5		Sir Vincent Eri (1936–1993)	1990	27 February 1990	4 October 1991	1 year, 219 days	Elizabeth II (1975–2022)
–		Dennis Young (1936–2008)	—	4 October 1991	18 November 1991	45 days	Elizabeth II (1975–2022)
6		Sir Wiwa Korowi (born 1948)	1991	18 November 1991	20 November 1997	6 years, 2 days	Elizabeth II (1975–2022)
7		Sir Silas Atopare (1951–2021)	1997	20 November 1997	20 November 2003	6 years	Elizabeth II (1975–2022)
–		Bill Skate (1953–2006)	—	21 November 2003	28 May 2004	189 days	Elizabeth II (1975–2022)
–		Jeffery Nape (1964–2016)	—	28 May 2004	29 June 2004	32 days	Elizabeth II (1975–2022)
8		Sir Paulias Matane (1931–2021)	2004	29 June 2004	13 December 2010	6 years, 167 days	Elizabeth II (1975–2022)
–		Jeffery Nape (1964–2016)	—	13 December 2010	20 December 2010	7 days	Elizabeth II (1975–2022)
–		Sir Michael Ogio (1942–2017)	—	20 December 2010	25 February 2011	6 years, 60 days	Elizabeth II (1975–2022)
9		Sir Michael Ogio (1942–2017)	2011	25 February 2011	18 February 2017^{[†]}	6 years, 60 days	Elizabeth II (1975–2022)
–		Theo Zurenuoc (born 1965)	—	18 February 2017	28 February 2017	10 days	Elizabeth II (1975–2022)
10		Sir Bob Dadae (born 1961)	2017	28 February 2017	16 March 2023	9 years, 240 days	
10		Sir Bob Dadae (born 1961)	2022	16 March 2023	Incumbent	9 years, 240 days	Charles III (2022–present)

== See also ==
- List of colonial governors of Papua New Guinea#Territory of Papua and New Guinea
