= Sevese Morea =

Sevese Morea, CMG

Speaker of the National Parliament
- In office 1980–1982
- Preceded by: Kingsford Dibela
- Succeeded by: Dennish Young

Member of the National Parliament
- In office 1977–1982
- Succeeded by: Legu Vagi
- Constituency: Moresby South Open

Personal details
- Born: Territory of Papua and New Guinea
- Died: August 1982 (aged 38); Vabukori, Papua New Guinea

Sevese Oipi Morea CMG (died August 1982) was a Papua New Guinean radio broadcaster, businessman and politician. He served as a member of the National Parliament from 1977 to 1982, and as Speaker from 1980 until 1982.

== Biography ==
Morea worked as a radio broadcaster for ten years, having been trained by the Australian Broadcasting Corporation, taking over several roles previously carried out by Australians. He subsequently became a businessman in Port Moresby.

He contested the Central Regional constituency in the 1968 elections, but finished fifth in a field of six candidates. In the 1972 elections he contested the Moresby Coastal Open seat, finishing second to Gavera Rea.

He ran again in the Moresby South Open constituency in 1977 as a Papua Besena candidate and was elected to the National Parliament. In February 1979, he was elected Lord Mayor of Port Moresby. However, he left office in July the same year after losing a vote of no confidence. In 1980, he was elected Speaker after the resignation of Kingsford Dibela. He was subsequently made a Companion of the Order of St Michael and St George in the 1981 New Year Honours.

However, he lost his seat in the 1982 elections. Following the elections, he submitted a petition against the result. However, he died of heart attack the following day aged 38, and was given a state funeral on 25 August. Two schools in the Gabatu area of Port Moresby were named after him.
