= Margaret Nakikus =

Papua New Guinea government planner

- Born: Matupit, Rabaul, East New Britain, Papua New Guinea (PNG)
- Died: 1992
- Occupation: Government planner
- Known for: Wife of PNG prime minister Rabbie Namaliu
- Children: One daughter and two sons

Margaret Nakikus (died 1992) was the first Papua New Guinean woman to head that country's National Planning Office. She is also known as the wife of Rabbie Namaliu, who was Papua New Guinea's prime minister between 1988 and 1992.

== Early life ==
Margaret Latatuai Nakikus came from Matupit, near Rabaul in the East New Britain province of Papua New Guinea (PNG). Overcoming the reluctance of her parents to let her leave, she left home in the early 1970s to attend the University of Papua New Guinea in Port Moresby, becoming one of the first female graduates of that university.

== Career ==
Little information is available about the early career of Nakikus. She produced several publications and made presentations at conferences in the Pacific Islands. Her early research interest seems to have been focused on migration, particularly on resettlement schemes in PNG that involved moving people from the Highlands Region to coastal and island locations to cultivate oil palm.

Nakikus was the first Papua New Guinean woman to head the country's National Planning Office. 1990 was designated by UNESCO as International Literacy Year (ILY). This coincided with the initiation of PNG's Literacy and Awareness Programme and Nakikus chaired the national ILY committee.

== Personal life ==
Nakikus had her daughter Joy in 1971. Nakikus married the politician Rabbie Namaliu in 1987. They had two sons, Isaac and Langanai (Rabbie Jnr). Namaliu was prime minister from July 1988 until July 1992. After his defeat in parliament in 1992 he left politics to be with Nakikus, who had incurable leukaemia and was in hospital in Brisbane, Australia. She died in 1992. After her death their daughter was looked after by Mekere Morauta, who would also become prime minister, and his wife.

== Publications ==
- Nakikus, Margaret. Marjorie Andrew, Angela Mandie-Filer, and Bungtabu Brown, Papua New Guinea: Women in Development Sector Review, United Nations Development Programme, 1991.
- Nakikus, Margaret. Planning for women's advancement in Papua New Guinea. In Peter King, Wendy Lee & Vincent Waraki (eds) 1985 From Rhetoric to Reality? Papua New Guinea's Eight Point Plan and National Goals After a Decade, UPNG, Port Moresby Press, Port Moresby,1985.
- Nakikus, M. The impact of land resettlement schemes on women in Papua New Guinea. Women in development in the South Pacific: Barriers and opportunities, Port Vila, Vanuatu. 1985
- Lifu, K. and Nakikus, M. Papua New Guinea. Unpublished paper to SPC/ILO Conference on Migration, Employment and Development in the South Pacific, Noumea. 1982.
