= Wiwa Korowi =

6th governor-general of Papua New Guinea

Sir Wiwa Korowi GCMG

6th Governor-General of Papua New Guinea
- In office 18 November 1991 – 20 November 1997
- Monarch: Elizabeth II
- Prime Minister: Rabbie Namaliu; Paias Wingti; Julius Chan; John Giheno; Bill Skate
- Preceded by: Dennis Young (acting)
- Succeeded by: Silas Atopare

Personal details
- Born: 7 July 1948 (age 77)

Sir Wiwa Korowi GCMG (born 7 July 1948) is a Papua New Guinean politician who served as the governor-general of Papua New Guinea from November 1991 until November 1997.

Sir Wiwa is from the Southern Highlands. He was a member of the Nationalist Party and was voted by the Parliament to the position of governor-general on 18 November 1991, to fill the position after Vincent Eri had vacated roughly one and a half months earlier.

== Sources ==
- Lentz, Harris M., III. Heads of States and Governments. Jefferson, NC: McFarland & Company, 1994. ISBN 0-89950-926-6.

Government offices
Preceded by Dennis Young (acting)	Governor-General of Papua New Guinea; 1991-1997	Succeeded by Silas Atopare
