= John Giheno =

Papua New Guinea Prime Minister (1949–2017)

The Honourable John Giheno CMG

5th Prime Minister of Papua New Guinea
- In office 27 March 1997 – 2 June 1997
- Monarch: Elizabeth II
- Governor-General: Wiwa Korowi
- Preceded by: Julius Chan
- Succeeded by: Julius Chan

Personal details
- Born: 1949 Yontebe, Henganofi District
- Died: 20 March 2017 (aged 67–68) Port Moresby
- Party: Pangu Party
- Spouse: Julie Giheno

John Giheno, CMG (1949 – 20 March 2017) was a Papua New Guinea politician and government minister. Giheno served as acting Prime Minister of Papua New Guinea from 27 March until 2 June 1997, following the resignation of then Prime Minister Julius Chan.

Prime Minister Julius Chan resigned on 27 March 1997, following a scandal regarding the hiring of foreign mercenaries to fight rebels on the island of Bougainville. The use of mercenaries by the Chan government resulted in a Papua New Guinea Defence Force mutiny codenamed 'Operasen Rausim Kwik' and riots in Bougainville. Chan stated that he resigned to preserve peace in Papua New Guinea.

The Cabinet chose John Giheno, who was serving as the mining and petroleum minister at the time, as acting prime minister until new elections could be held. Giheno served as prime minister as a caretaker until new elections could be held in June 1997. Sixteen government ministers in the Chan government, including both Giheno and Chan, lost their seats in Parliament in the June 1997 general election.

In the 1996 New Years Honours List he was appointed a Companion of the Order of St Michael and St George (CMG).

Political offices
Preceded by Julius Chan	Prime Minister of Papua New Guinea; 1997	Succeeded by Julius Chan
