= St John Ambulance PNG =

Health charity organisation in Papua New Guinea

National St John Council of Papua New Guinea
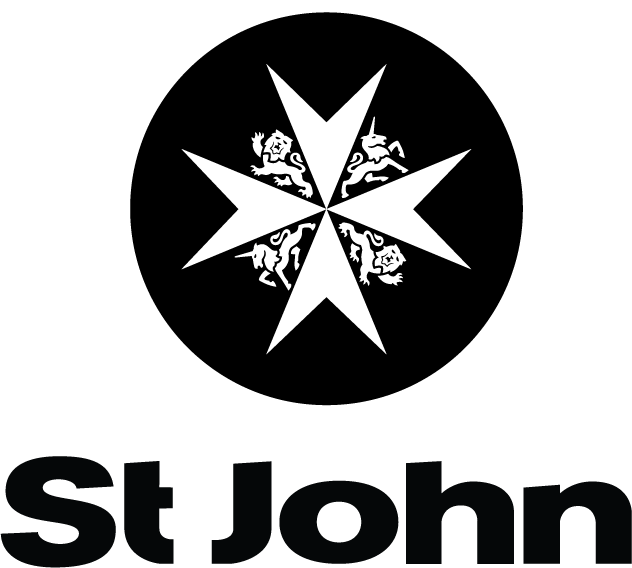
- Established: 1957
- Stations: 5 ambulance; 1 fixed wing; 1 helicopter
- CEO: Arabella Koliwan
- Medical director: Mangu Kendino, OStJ
- Website: https://stjohn.org.pg/

St John Ambulance (officially, the National St John Council of Papua New Guinea) is a health and humanitarian charity that operates the national ambulance service in Papua New Guinea. It is an association of the International Order of St John.

St John Ambulance provides ambulance and air medical services in Papua New Guinea for and on behalf of the PNG Government. St John's ambulance service is funded by the PNG government, partners, and its own fundraising. St John also provides first aid and basic health education.

== Services ==
St John provides a range of prehospital and primary care services. They also provide health education such as first aid training, first aid in schools, the School of Prehospital Care in Port Moresby. As a means of fundraising for the free public ambulance service, St John teaches first aid and sells first aid kits and medical supplies to the public.

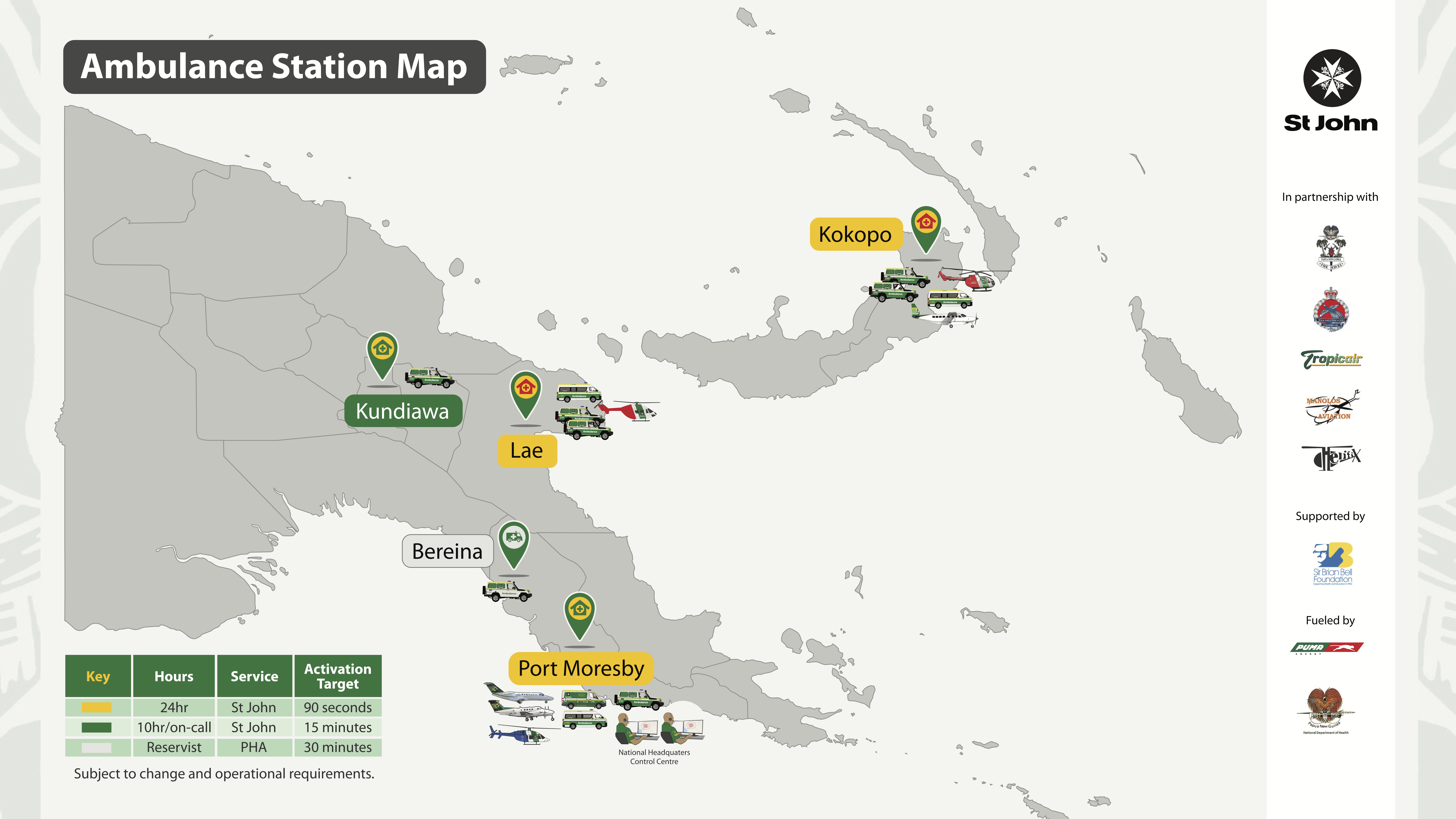
St John's ambulance station locations in Papua New Guinea

- Ambulance Stations
  - Port Moresby, National Capital District
  - Central Province
  - Kokopo/Rabaul, East New Britain
  - Lae, Morobe
  - Kundiawa, Chimbu (2021)
- Air Medical Stations
  - Fixed-wing – Tropicair PNG, Port Moresby
  - Rotary-wing (helicopter) – Manolos Aviation (Lae) and Helifix (POM)

== History ==
St John in Papua New Guinea was first established by the New South Wales Branch of St John in 1957.

When PNG became an independent state within the Commonwealth, the Parliament established St John as a statutory body through the St John Council Incorporation Act 1976.

In 1983 St John Ambulance took over the responsibility for providing the National Government's ambulance services in the Southern region.

In 2008, St John Ambulance was honored on a 50 toea coin.

In 2008, St John Ambulance stationed an ambulance in Kupiano, making it the first rural region in the country to have ambulance service.

In October 2010, St John Ambulance raised ambulance fees from K10 to K60 in the face of budget pressures. Fuel per patient cost approximately K170 at the time. St John Ambulance services were suspended in November 2010 due to funding problems.

In 2015, St John Ambulance again suspended operations due to financial issues. St John Ambulance officials said that the PNG government had failed to pay the amount earmarked for the organization, which the PNG government denied.

St John Ambulance played an important part in Papua New Guinea's response to the COVID-19 pandemic. St John worked with the government to establish a large field hospital, and operate a drive-thru testing centre in Port Moresby.
