= Julius Chan =

Papua New Guinean politician (1939–2025)

The Right Honourable Sir Julius Sungmen Chan GCL GCMG KBE
- 陳仲民
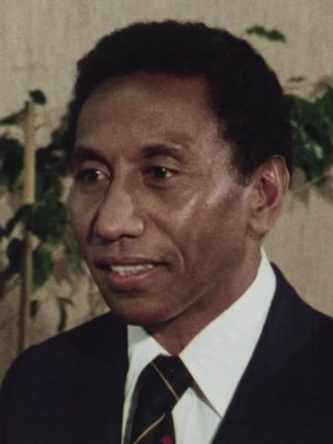
- Chan in 1981

2nd Prime Minister of Papua New Guinea
- In office 2 June 1997 – 22 July 1997
- Monarch: Elizabeth II
- Governor-General: Wiwa Korowi
- Preceded by: John Giheno
- Succeeded by: Bill Skate
- In office 30 August 1994 – 27 March 1997
- Monarch: Elizabeth II
- Governor-General: Wiwa Korowi
- Preceded by: Paias Wingti
- Succeeded by: John Giheno
- In office 11 March 1980 – 2 August 1982
- Monarch: Elizabeth II
- Governor-General: Tore Lokoloko
- Preceded by: Michael Somare
- Succeeded by: Michael Somare

4th Governor of New Ireland
- In office 6 August 2007 – 30 January 2025
- Monarchs: Elizabeth II; Charles III
- Preceded by: Ian Ling-Stuckey
- Succeeded by: James Byron Chan

Personal details
- Born: 29 August 1939 Tanga Islands, Territory of New Guinea
- Died: 30 January 2025 (aged 85) Huris, New Ireland Province, Papua New Guinea
- Party: People's Progress Party
- Spouse: Stella Chan (m. 1966)
- Children: 4, including Byron

Sir Julius Chan (Chinese: 陳仲民, 29 August 1939 – 30 January 2025) was a Papua New Guinean politician who served as Prime Minister of Papua New Guinea from 1980 to 1982 and from 1994 to 1997. He was Member of Parliament for New Ireland Province, having won the seat in the 2007 national election. He was also the Governor of New Ireland Province from 2007 until his death in 2025. On 26 May 2019, Prime Minister Peter O'Neill announced he would soon resign and that he wished for Sir Julius to succeed him. An outgoing Prime Minister does not, however, have the power to appoint his successor, and the following day O'Neill delayed his own formal resignation. He was also a leading figure in his country during the years-long Bougainville conflict.

== Early life ==
Chan was born as the fifth child out of seven children on the Tanga Islands in the Territory of New Guinea, in what is now New Ireland Province, the son of Chan Pak (陳柏), a trader from Taishan, China, and Miriam Tinkoris, a native New Irelander. In addition to English, he spoke Cantonese, Tok Pisin, and Sursurunga. He was educated at Marist College Ashgrove in Brisbane, Queensland, Australia.

== Early political career ==
Chan first became actively involved in politics in the 1960s. He was elected to represent the Namatanai district of New Ireland province in the pre-independence House of Assembly in 1968 and was re-elected in 1972, 1977, 1982, 1987 and 1992. He was Deputy Prime Minister four times (1976, 1985, 1986, 1992–1994), and Minister of Finance three times (1972–1977, 1985–1986 and 1992–1994). He also held the portfolios of Primary Industry (1977–78) and External Affairs and Trade (1994). Chan became leader of the People's Progress Party in 1970. He was knighted as a Knight Commander of the Order of the British Empire (KBE) in 1981, and appointed a Privy Counsellor the next year.

== Prime minister ==
Chan first became prime minister on 11 March 1980, succeeding the country's first prime minister, Michael Somare, after he launched a no-confidence motion against him over a disagreement on whether to increase the salaries of MPs and require them to divest from their business interests. He served as prime minister until 2 August 1982, when Somare regained the position. During his first tenure, which was marred by fiscal problems, he oversaw an austerity program, infrastructure projects and the devaluation of the kina. In 1980, he also ordered the deployment of the Papua New Guinea Defence Force to support the government of Vanuatu against rebels during the Coconut War, in what was the first overseas operation by the PNGDF.

He succeeded Prime Minister Paias Wingti in August 1994 and took office on the dual platform of national security and appropriate economic management. In 1997, the Chan government's multimillion-dollar contract with Sandline International, a mercenary organization, to counter separatist guerrilla warfare on Bougainville caused the Sandline affair, with immense public protests and a 10-day mutiny by the underpaid national army, which became known as Rausim Kwik. He was also criticised for his decision to float the kina in 1994, citing a balance of payments crisis.

During his term as prime minister, Chan was also implicated in the 1994 Cairns Conservatory purchase in which he approved the purchase of the said building for A$18.7 million, despite it having been purchased two weeks earlier by the sellers for A$9.8 million. An Ombudsman Commission investigation subsequently found that he had an undeclared conflict of interest.

On 25 March 1997, during an inquiry that started on 21 March that caused five ministers to resign, the Parliament defeated a motion calling on Chan to resign (59–38). However, the next day, Chan and two ministers chose to step down, and John Giheno, a member of Chan's party, became acting prime minister a day later. He regained the position on 2 June 1997, shortly before the national elections. Chan was defeated in the national election in June 1997 and was succeeded as prime minister by Bill Skate on 22 July 1997. Chan was later acquitted on corruption charges relating to the Sandline affair. He remained out of Parliament until winning the New Ireland Provincial seat in the June–July 2007 election.

== Later career ==
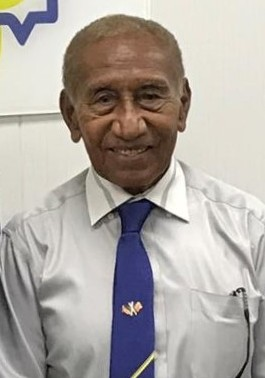
Chan in 2021

In 2002, Chan ran for a seat in the New Ireland provincial assembly but lost to Ian Ling-Stuckey. During the "horse trading" phase of negotiations following the 2007 general election, Chan was nominated for the position of prime minister, with the backing of Mekere Morauta and Bart Philemon, as an alternative to the large National Alliance grouping which appeared likely to again be led by Somare. Parliamentary Speaker Jeffrey Nape rejected Chan's nomination as a candidate and Somare won the vote to become Prime Minister without opposition on 13 August, while 21 members of Parliament joined Chan's opposition group. Chan was briefly Leader of the Opposition, but gave up the position to Mekere Morauta in August 2007. That same month, he became governor of New Ireland Province, during which he established a pension system and promoted the usage of the MaiMai, New Ireland's Chieftain System as a recognised decision-making body in provincial politics.

In his later years, Chan was referred to in Papua New Guinea as the "Last Man Standing", in reference to him outliving many members of the first post-independence parliament. He released his memoirs in 2015.

== Personal life and death ==
Chan married Stella, Lady Chan in 1966 and had four children: Vanessa Andrea, Byron James, Mark Gavin, and Toea Julius. His son Byron Chan was Member of Parliament for Namatanai Open electorate, covering the south of New Ireland from 2002 until 2017. Among his nephews was MP Walter Schnaubelt.

Chan died in Huris, New Ireland Province on 30 January 2025, at the age of 85. The Papua New Guinean government declared a one-week period of national mourning over his death and granted Chan, whose remains were transported to Port Moresby, a state funeral on 2 February. His remains were then returned to New Ireland, where he was buried on 6 February.

== Honours ==
- Papua New Guinea:
  - Highest denominator K100 Banknote featured Late Sir Julius Chan's Portrait launched on 27 January 2026.
- United Kingdom:
- Papua New Guinea:
  - Grand Companion of the Order of Logohu (GCL)
- United Kingdom:
  - Knight Grand Cross of the Order of St Michael and St George (GCMG)
  - Knight Commander of the Order of the British Empire (KBE)

== See also ==
Political offices
| Preceded by Albert Maori Kiki | Deputy Prime Minister of Papua New Guinea; 1977–1978 | Succeeded by Ebia Olewale |
| Preceded by Sir Michael Somare | Prime Minister of Papua New Guinea; 1980–1982 | Succeeded by Sir Michael Somare |
| Preceded by John Momis | Deputy Prime Minister of Papua New Guinea; 1985–1988 | Succeeded by Akoka Doi |
| Preceded by Akoka Doi | Deputy Prime Minister of Papua New Guinea; 1992–1994 | Succeeded by Chris Haiveta |
| Preceded by Paias Wingti | Prime Minister of Papua New Guinea; 1994–1997 | Succeeded by Bill Skate |
