= Vincent Eri =

5th governor-general of Papua New Guinea

Sir Vincent Eri GCMG

5th Governor-General of Papua New Guinea
- In office 27 February 1990 – 4 October 1991
- Monarch: Elizabeth II
- Prime Minister: Rabbie Namaliu
- Preceded by: Ignatius Kilage
- Succeeded by: Dennis Young (acting)

Personal details
- Born: Vincent Serei Eri; 12 September 1936 Moveave, Gulf Province, Territory of Papua
- Died: 25 May 1993 (aged 56) Port Moresby, Papua New Guinea
- Children: 6
- Education: University of Papua New Guinea

Sir Vincent Serei Eri GCMG (12 September 1936 – 25 May 1993) was a Papua New Guinean politician who served as the fifth governor-general of Papua New Guinea from February 1990 to October 1991.

== Early life ==
Eri was born on 12 September 1936 at the village of Moveave in the Gulf Province of the Territory of Papua. He was the second of three children born to Morasuru Lafe and Eri Haiveta. His father was a deacon in the London Missionary Society.

Eri's parents died when he was young. His father was a "Fuzzy Wuzzy Angel" during World War II and died while carrying supplies for Australian soldiers on the Bulldog Track. He was subsequently raised by an aunt and uncle, attending Catholic mission schools at Terapo and Yule Island. He completed his secondary education at the Sogeri Education Centre and went on to study teaching at a training college.

Eri worked as a schoolteacher from 1956 to 1962, at village schools in Gulf Province. He was promoted to acting district inspector in 1962 as the Australian administration sought to promote native teachers. In 1965 he joined the staff of the Port Moresby Teachers College, where he was a co-founder of the Local Teachers Association. He was granted leave from teaching to study at the newly established University of Papua New Guinea, graduating Bachelor of Arts in 1970 as one of the first cohort of graduates.

== Politics ==
In 1975, Eri was appointed Papua New Guinea's first Consul General in Australia. From 1975 to 1979, he also served as High Commissioner. In the 1981 Birthday Honours he was appointed a Companion of the Order of St Michael and St George (CMG) for his service as Secretary for Defence. Together with Ted Diro, he founded the People's Action Party in 1986 and was elected to the National Parliament.

He succeeded Kingsford Dibela as Governor-General of Papua New Guinea on 27 February 1990 and was promoted to Knight Grand Cross of the Order of St Michael and St George. Shortly after taking office, he was faced with a constitutional crisis. Ted Diro, now the Deputy Prime Minister, had been found guilty of corruption. The constitution required the Governor-General to dismiss him, but he did not. This created some controversy, and there were calls for Eri himself to leave office, which he did not. Ultimately, Prime Minister Rabbie Namaliu sent a formal request to Queen Elizabeth II to replace him. On 4 October 1991, before Namaliu's request could be acted upon, Eri resigned from office.

== The Crocodile ==
He is often cited as being the first Papua New Guinean national to publish a book in English; The Crocodile (a novel), which was published in 1970. However, in 1932, the country's first Methodist Priest, Hosea Linge, known as "Ligeremaluoga", published an autobiography that was translated as The Erstwhile Savage.

The Crocodile is about the colonial period. Its title refers partially to a crocodile in Moveave and partially to the assistant district officer, Jim Green, who received the main character, Hoiri, together with other Fuzzy Wuzzy Angels in Lae during World War II. It was compulsory reading in secondary schools during the 1970s and 80s. In 2011, the Crocodile Prize was established as an annual literary award.

== Personal life ==
In 1959, Eri married Margaret Karulaka, a nurse, with whom he had four sons and two daughters. He died of a heart attack in Port Moresby on 25 May 1992, aged 56, and was buried at his home village of Moveave.

== See also ==
- Culture of Papua New Guinea

Government offices
Preceded by Ignatius Kilage	Governor-General of Papua New Guinea; 1990–1991	Succeeded by Dennis Young (acting)
