= Bill Skate =

Acting governor-general of Papua New Guinea

Sir Bill Skate KCMG

Acting Governor General of Papua New Guinea
- In office 20 November 2003 – 3 March 2004
- Monarch: Elizabeth II
- Prime Minister: Michael Somare
- Preceded by: Silas Atopare
- Succeeded by: Jeffery Nape (acting)

6th Prime Minister of Papua New Guinea
- In office 22 July 1997 – 14 July 1999
- Monarch: Elizabeth II
- Governors General: Wiwa Korowi; Silas Atopare
- Preceded by: Julius Chan
- Succeeded by: Mekere Morauta

Personal details
- Born: William Jack Skate; 26 September 1953 Papua New Guinea
- Died: 3 January 2006 (aged 52) Brisbane, Queensland, Australia
- Party: People's National Congress Party
- Spouse: Lady Rarua Skate

Sir William Jack Skate KCMG (26 September 1953 – 3 January 2006) was a prominent Papua New Guinea politician. He was the son of an Australian father and a Papua New Guinean mother. Though his career was turbulent and often marked by setbacks, he served in the highest posts in his country: prime minister of Papua New Guinea, speaker of the National Parliament, and as acting governor-general of Papua New Guinea.

== Life ==
Before entering politics, he graduated from university as an accountant.

Skate became manager of the capital district commission in 1987. He was elected to parliament in 1992 and served as speaker from 1992 to 1994, supporting the government of Paias Wingti.

Skate served as governor of the National Capital District from 1995 to 1997.

== Prime Minister of Papua New Guinea ==
He was prime minister from 1997 to 1999.

After the 1997 elections, it was initially expected by some observers that Prime Minister Michael Somare would become Prime Minister. However, negotiations between Somare's National Alliance party and Skate's People's National Congress party broke down as neither leader would concede the premiership. Skate then formed a partnership with Pangu and the People's Progress Party.

Skate became prime minister on 22 July 1997, defeating the coalition of former Prime Minister Michael Somare.

In the final months of the government of his predecessor, diplomatic efforts were made to reach a non-military solution to end the Bougainville conflict, which Skate endorsed. The Burnham Truce was announced on 10 October 1997, where key factions in the Bougainville conflict, with the exception of Bougainville Revolutionary Army leader Francis Ona, agreed to an interim truce, and to work towards a formal agreement to put forward a permanent truce. In November 1997 the Truce Monitoring Group began to be deployed in Bougainville.

On 26 November 1997, two tapes released by a former government adviser, Australian businessman Mujo Sefa, were broadcast by the Australian Broadcasting Corporation. One tape purportedly showed Skate authorizing bribes in a discussion with the Internal Affairs Minister. The second tape involves Skate describing his personal involvement in a murder of a man who threatened his life. He was also quoted as saying: "If I tell my gang members to kill, then they kill. There is no other Godfather, I am the Godfather." As a result, Skate launched defamation advantages against the ABC.

In the wake of the Sandline affair which brought down his predecessor, Skate's government vowed not to pay Sandline International the USD 18 million the company claimed. After an international tribunal and Australian court ruled in favor of Sandline, his government paid the company.

Towards the end of his term, his government established diplomatic relations with the Republic of China (ROC). However, this move was criticized within Papua New Guinea, with accusations that diplomatic relations were established in exchange for a US$250 million loan. The ROC government denied these accusations. Before his resignation, it was disclosed by Deputy Prime Minister Iaiaro Lasaro that Cabinet had neither endorsed or authorized this move.

Facing a scheduled no-confidence motion, he resigned as Prime Minister on 7 July 1999 in an effort to save his government. On 14 July 1999, Sir Mekere Morauta succeeded him as prime minister in a vote of 99-5. After Skate's resignation, Prime Minister Morauta vowed to cancel the deal with Taiwan.

== Later life and death ==
He was appointed Leader of the Opposition from 1999 to 2001. In 2002, his political party the People's National Congress Party (PNC) became a coalition partner in the government of Michael Somare and Skate became Speaker of the National Parliament. He was appointed acting governor-general in November 2003, a constitutional requirement when that office falls vacant. Pato Kakeraya was scheduled to take up the office on 20 January 2004, but Skate continued to act in the office because of court challenges to Kakeraya's election.

On 3 March 2004, Skate was suspended as acting governor-general because of allegations that he misappropriated funds during the 1990s. He then advised the Prime Minister to appoint a cabinet minister as acting governor-general. The following day, however, he was cleared of the financial charges in court, and he became acting governor-general again. In May 2004, his party left the coalition when he and other members refused to support a constitutional amendment supported by Somare which would have given the government more time to be immune to no-confidence votes. As a result, the PNC became the largest opposition party.

On 28 May 2004, Skate ceased to be Speaker when the parliament elected a pro-government candidate, Jeffery Nape. The office of governor-general was still vacant at that stage, so Nape automatically succeeded Skate as acting governor-general.

Bill Skate was knighted in January 2005 for services to parliament, becoming Sir William Skate. In February 2005, he was expelled from the PNC, after its remaining membership decided to comply with political integrity laws.

He died in hospital on 3 January 2006, in Brisbane, Australia, where he had been airlifted after suffering a stroke in late December 2005. His body was flown back to Port Moresby, accompanied by his wife Lady Rarua, and son William Jnr Skate. He is buried in a graveyard on Independence Hill in Port Moresby.

== See also ==
- List of members of the Papua New Guinean Parliament who died in office

Political offices
Preceded by Julius Chan	Prime Minister of Papua New Guinea; 1997–1999	Succeeded by Mekere Morauta
Preceded by Silas Atopare	Governor-General of Papua New Guinea (acting); 2003–2004	Succeeded by Jeffery Nape (acting)
National Parliament of Papua New Guinea
Preceded by Dennis Young	Speaker of the National Parliament of Papua New Guinea; 1992–1994	Succeeded by Rabbie Namaliu
Preceded by Bernard Narokobi	Speaker of the National Parliament of Papua New Guinea; 2002–2004	Succeeded by Jeffery Nape
