= Silas Atopare =

7th governor-general of Papua New Guinea (1951–2021)

Sir Silas Atopare GCL GCMG
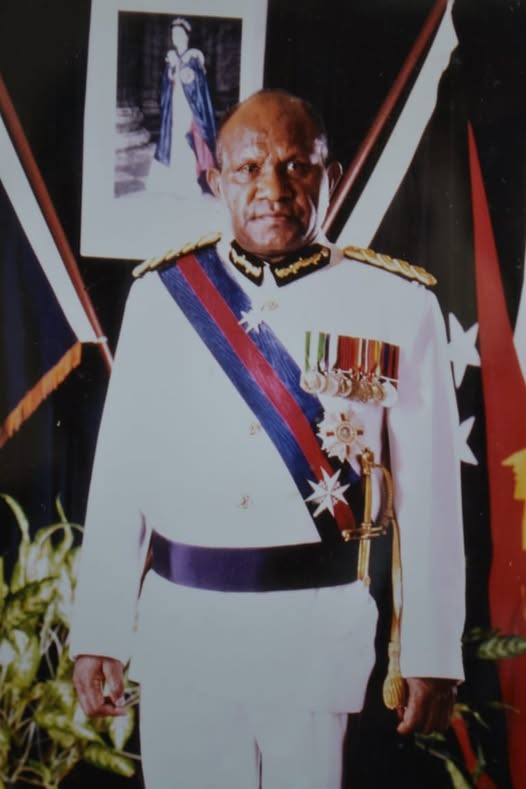

7th Governor General of Papua New Guinea
- In office 20 November 1997 – 20 November 2003
- Monarch: Elizabeth II
- Prime Minister: Bill Skate; Mekere Morauta; Michael Somare
- Preceded by: Wiwa Korowi
- Succeeded by: Bill Skate (acting)

Personal details
- Born: 1951 Goroka, Territory of New Guinea
- Died: September 16, 2021 (aged 70) Goroka, Papua New Guinea
- Spouse(s): Lady Agatha Atopare and Lady Ruth Atopare
- Children: 7

Sir Silas Atopare GCL GCMG (1951 – 16 September 2021) was a Papua New Guinean politician who served as the seventh governor-general of Papua New Guinea from November 1997 until November 2003.

== Early life and education ==
Atopare was born in Kabiufa, near Goroka in what is now the Eastern Highlands Province of Papua New Guinea. He attended Kabiufa Primary School, and then went to Kambubu Adventist High School in East New Britain Province.

In 1967, he joined the Department of Agriculture and Livestock and in 1974 he became a coffee plantation manager. A keen rugby player, he formed the Asaro Hawks, which was the first team of Papua New Guineans to compete in the largely expatriate Goroka Rugby League.

== Political career ==
In 1977, at the age of 25, he was elected to the National Parliament of Papua New Guinea, representing Goroka but failed to be re-elected in 1982. He subsequently held many roles, including being a board member of Air Niugini. In January 1989 he was appointed inaugural Chairman of the Eastern Highlands Capital Authority, set up by the Provincial Government to manage the provision of urban services for the town of Goroka (until 1992), in the course of which Goroka town was restored to be the best serviced urban centre in PNG. He was also appointed President of the Goroka Show Society.

In 1991, he was made secretary-general of the PNG Smallholder Coffee Growers Association and, in 1997, was appointed as governor-general.

In 1998, he was knighted as a Knight Grand Cross of the Order of St Michael and St George. He had to bring order when violence and controversy marred the electoral process in PNG's oil and gas rich Southern Highlands Province. In 2008, Atopare was appointed Grand Chief in the Order of Logohu.

Atopare died in Goroka on 16 September 2021, during the 46th Independence Day celebrations. A state funeral was held in Port Moresby.

== Personal life ==
Atopare was a practicing polygamist who had two wives Agatha and Ruth. The children that he had with his wives were named Mole, Stony, Eddie, Helen, Serah, Elizabeth and Kalo. Atopare was a member of the Seventh-day Adventist Church.

Government offices
Preceded by Wiwa Korowi	Governor-General of Papua New Guinea; 1997–2003	Succeeded by Bill Skate (acting)
