= Vabukori =

- Location within Papua New Guinea
- Coordinates: 9°30′5″S 147°11′12″E
- Country: Papua New Guinea
- Province: NCD
- City: Port Moresby
- Time zone: UTC+10 (AEST)

Vabukori is a Motu Koitabu coastal village located in the Moresby South electorate of Port Moresby, the capital city of Papua New Guinea. Vabukori is one of the villages in Central Province that speaks traditional Motu language along with other villages like Hanuabada and Porebada.
