= Speaker of the National Parliament of Papua New Guinea =

This is a list of speakers of the National Parliament of Papua New Guinea:

Legislature	Name	Period
1st House of Assembly	Horace Niall	June 8, 1964 – June 3, 1968
2nd House of Assembly	John Guise	June 4, 1968 – April 20, 1972
3rd House of Assembly	Perry Kwan	April 20, 1972 – June 22, 1972
3rd House of Assembly	Sir Barry Holloway	June 23, 1972 – September 16, 1975
1st National Parliament	Sir Barry Holloway	September 16, 1975 – August 9, 1977
1st National Parliament	Sir Kingsford Dibela	August 9, 1977 – March 14, 1980
2nd National Parliament	Sevese Oipi Morea	March 14, 1980 – August 1, 1982
3rd National Parliament	Sir Dennis Young	August 2, 1982 – October 26, 1982
3rd National Parliament	Timothy Bonga	November 8, 1982 – November 21, 1985
3rd National Parliament	Brown Sinamoi	November 21, 1985 – August 4, 1987
4th National Parliament	Akoka Doi	August 5, 1987 – November 25, 1987
4th National Parliament	Sir Dennis Young	November 26, 1987 – July 16, 1992
5th National Parliament	Sir Bill Skate MP	July 17, 1992 – August 30, 1994
5th National Parliament	Sir Rabbie Namaliu	August 30, 1994 – July 21, 1997
6th National Parliament	John Pundari	July 22, 1997 – July 13, 1999
6th National Parliament	Iairo Lasaro	July 13, 1999 – July 14, 1999
6th National Parliament	Bernard Narokobi	July 14, 1999 – August 5, 2002
7th National Parliament	Sir Bill Skate MP	August 5, 2002 – May 28, 2004
7th National Parliament	Hon Jeffrey Nape MP	May 28, 2004 – August 13, 2007
8th National Parliament	Hon Jeffrey Nape MP	August 13, 2007 – August 3, 2012
9th National Parliament	Theo Zurenuoc MP	August 3, 2012 – August 2, 2017
10th National Parliament	Job Pomat MP	August 2, 2017 – present

== Election results ==
Election results

2022 Speaker of the National Parliament of Papua New Guinea election
Party	Candidate	Votes	%	±%
Pangu Pati	Job Pomat	Unopposed	100.00	+43.70
Pangu Pati hold		Swing	+43.70	

2017 Speaker of the National Parliament of Papua New Guinea election
Party	Candidate	Votes	%	±%
PNC	Job Pomat	60	56.60	
MLP	Allan Marat	46	43.40	
Turnout		106	95.50	
PNC hold		Swing		

== Sources ==
- PNG speakers of Parliament
