= Paias Wingti =

Prime Minister of Papua New Guinea

The Right Honourable Paias Wingti PC
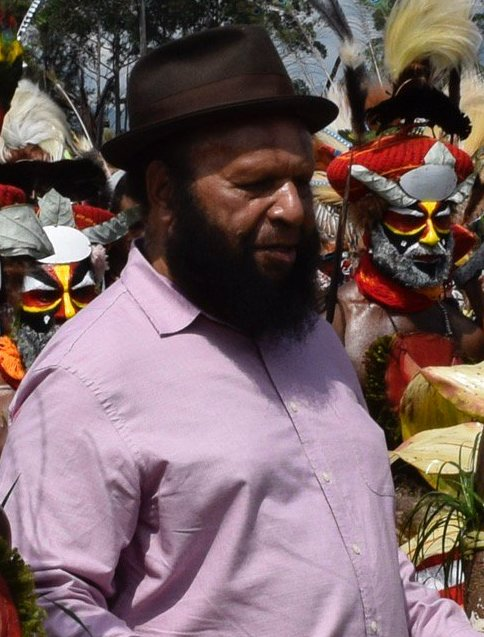
- Wingti in 2018

3rd Prime Minister of Papua New Guinea
- In office 17 July 1992 – 30 August 1994
- Monarch: Elizabeth II
- Governor-General: Wiwa Korowi
- Preceded by: Rabbie Namaliu
- Succeeded by: Julius Chan
- In office 21 November 1985 – 4 July 1988
- Monarch: Elizabeth II
- Governor-General: Sir Kingsford Dibela
- Preceded by: Michael Somare
- Succeeded by: Rabbie Namaliu

Personal details
- Born: 2 February 1951 (age 74); Moika Village, Territory of Papua and New Guinea
- Political party: Pangu Party (Until 1985); People's Democratic Movement (1985-Present)
- Spouse: Dianne Kende (1991-1994)
- Children: 1
- Education: University of Papua New Guinea

Paias Wingti (born 2 February 1951) is a Papua New Guinean politician who served as Prime Minister of Papua New Guinea from 1985 to 1988, and 1992 to 1994.

== Early life and education ==
Wingti hails from the Jika Tribe of the Western Highlands province, and was born in Moika village, near Mount Hagen. He did not go to school until the age of 10, but was later educated at Mount Hagen High School. He enrolled at the University of Papua New Guinea in Port Moresby in 1974, and first visited Australia as an Australian Union of Students delegate for the UPNG Student Representative Council. While doing his final year in Economics at university, he contested the 1977 election, and won the Hagen Open seat, joining Michael Somare's Pangu Party.

== Career ==
=== Prime Minister ===
Prime Minister Michael Somare lost a motion of no confidence on 21 November 1985, and Wingti was selected to succeed him. He was the first person from the New Guinea Highlands to serve as prime minister. Wingti maintained his majority in the 1987 election and defeated Somare to become prime minister by a vote of 54 to 51.

Ted Diro, one of the key members of Wingti's coalition and leader of the People's Action Party, resigned in November 1987, after being charged with five counts of perjury during an investigation which determined he made millions in illegal forestry dealings while serving as Minister of Forestry. Diro attempted to regain an office in Wingti's cabinet, but Wingti refused.

On 11 April 1988, Diro requested to be appointed as deputy prime minister who else PAP would join the opposition. A new session of parliament opened that day, but was dismissed after two-and-a-half hours to prevent a motion of no confidence from being brought up. Diro was given a position in the cabinet, but other members of the coalition were opposed to this. A motion of no confidence while filed when parliament reconvened on 27 June. Diro switched his support from Wingti to Rabbie Namaliu. Wingti's government lost a motion of no confidence by a 58 to 50 vote on 4 July, and a coalition government was formed by Namaliu.

Elections were called for 1992. On 17 July, Wingti defeated Namaliu to be elected prime minister by a vote of 55 to 54, with the Speaker casting the deciding vote.

Wingti was concerned of facing a leadership challenge from Deputy Prime Minister Julius Chan in 1993. He secretly resigned in September, and was reelected by parliament the next day. This meant that he would be constitutionally protected from a motion of no confidence for 18 months. The opposition filed a lawsuit against this and the Supreme Court of Papua New Guinea ruled on 25 August 1994, that Wingti's resignation was valid, but that his reelection was invalid as parliament was not properly informed of his resignation. On 30 August, Chan was elected prime minister by a vote of 70 to 32.

=== Later career ===
Robert Lak, a Catholic priest, defeated Wingti in the 1997 election, but Wingti regained his seat in the 2002 election. Tom Olga, an independent candidate, defeated Wingti in the 2007 election.

Wingti led 14 MPs in a vote to remove Mekere Morauta as opposition leader in 2004, and replaced him with Andrew Baing. In 2004, a motion of no confidence put up Wingti as an alternate prime minister, but Wingti stepped down in favour of Peter O'Neill, who was more popular.

== Personal life ==
Wingti married Dianne Kende, with whom he had a child, in 1991, but they divorced in 1994. In 1992, Wingti was sued by a woman who claimed that he fathered a child with her in 1982, and did not provide child support.

== Policies ==
=== Economic ===
The budget deficit rose from 1.2% of GDP in 1989, to 5.9% in 1993, and 10.8% in June 1994. The deficit reached K283.8 million in June 1994, which was the highest in the country's history. The deficit was reduced to K65 million by October through layoffs and austerity measures.

=== Governance ===
When Wingti assumed office in 1985, the provincial governments of Enga, Chimbu, and Manus were still under suspension.

=== Foreign ===
In 1985, Papua New Guinea denounced French nuclear testing in the Pacific and called for New Caledonia to be decolonised.

The Treaty of Mutual Respect, Friendship and Cooperation with signed between Papua New Guinea and Indonesia in 1986, but the Indonesian military continued to enter Papua New Guinea without permission to fight the Free Papua Movement. In April 1988, Indonesian soldiers remained in Papua New Guinea for three weeks before withdrawing after contact with the Papua New Guinea Defence Force.

== Works cited ==
=== Books ===
- May, R. (2022). State and Society in Papua New Guinea, 2001–2021. ANU Press. ISBN 9781760465209.
- Saffu, Yaw, ed. (1996). The 1992 Papua New Guinea Election: Change and Continuity in Electoral Politics. Australian National University. ISBN 0731523180.

=== Journals ===
- Hegarty, David (1989). "Papua New Guinea in 1988: Political Crossroads?". Asian Survey. 29 (2). University of California Press: 181–188. doi:10.2307/2644578. JSTOR 2644578.
- Premdas, Ralph (1986). "Papua New Guinea in 1985: The Tenth Anniversary of Independence". Asian Survey. 26 (2). University of California Press: 196–206. doi:10.2307/2644455. JSTOR 2644455.
- Saffu, Yaw (1995). "Papua New Guinea in 1994: Reaping the Whirlwind". Asian Survey. 35 (2). University of California Press: 221–225. doi:10.2307/2645034. JSTOR 2645034.

=== Magazines ===
- Hiambohn, Wally (1994). "The women in Wingti's life". Pacific Islands Monthly. Vol. 64, no. 8.

=== News ===
- "Paias Wingti loses seat in PNG elections". The Age. 7 August 2007. Archived from the original on 11 July 2025.

=== Web ===
- "Papua New Guinea". United States Department of State. Archived from the original on 21 January 2022.

Political offices
| Preceded by Iambakey Okuk | Deputy Prime Minister of Papua New Guinea; 1982-1985 | Succeeded by John Momis |
| Preceded by Sir Michael Somare | Prime Minister of Papua New Guinea; 1985–1988 | Succeeded by Sir Rabbie Namaliu |
| Preceded by Sir Rabbie Namaliu | Prime Minister of Papua New Guinea; 1992–1994 | Succeeded by Sir Julius Chan |
