= Kingsford Dibela =

3rd governor-general of Papua New Guinea

Sir Kingsford Dibela GCMG

3rd Governor-General of Papua New Guinea
- In office 1 March 1983 – 1 March 1989
- Monarch: Elizabeth II
- Prime Minister: Michael Somare; Paias Wingti; Rabbie Namaliu
- Preceded by: Tore Lokoloko
- Succeeded by: Ignatius Kilage

Personal details
- Born: 16 March 1932 Dogura, Milne Bay Province, Territory of Papua
- Died: 22 March 2002 (aged 70)

Sir Kingsford Dibela GCMG (16 March 1932 – 22 March 2002) was a Papua New Guinean politician who served as the third governor-general of Papua New Guinea from 1983 to 1989. He was also the second Speaker of the National Parliament of Papua New Guinea from 9 August 1977 to 14 March 1980.

== Career ==
Born in the Dogura area of mainland Milne Bay Province, he was a member of the Wedau people. He was employed as a primary school teacher beginning in 1949 until his election to the presidency of the Weraura Local Government Council in 1963. He was first elected to Parliament in 1975, and served as Speaker of that body from 1977 through 1980. He was named governor-general of Papua New Guinea on 1 March 1983, and served in that position until his resignation on February 27, 1990.

== Death ==
Dibela died on 22 March 2002.

Government offices
Preceded by Tore Lokoloko	Governor-General of Papua New Guinea; 1983–1989	Succeeded by Sir Ignatius Kilage
National Parliament of Papua New Guinea
Preceded by Barry Holloway	Speaker of the National Parliament of Papua New Guinea; 1977–1980	Succeeded by Sevese Oipi Morea
