= Ignatius Kilage =

4th governor-general of Papua New Guinea

Sir Ignatius Kilage GCMG CBE

4th Governor-General of Papua New Guinea
- In office 1 March 1989 – 31 December 1989
- Monarch: Elizabeth II
- Prime Minister: Rabbie Namaliu
- Preceded by: Kingsford Dibela
- Succeeded by: Vincent Eri

Personal details
- Born: 12 June 1941
- Died: 31 December 1989 (aged 48)

Sir Ignatius Kilage GCMG CBE (12 July 1941 – 31 December 1989) was a Papua New Guinean politician who served as the fourth Governor-General of Papua New Guinea from March to December 1989, when he died suddenly in office.

Prior to the vice regal post, Kilage was chief ombudsman of Papua New Guinea and author of the book My Mother Calls Me Yaltep.

After his death, a stadium was named in his honour in 1991.

Government offices
Preceded by Sir Kingsford Dibela	Governor-General of Papua New Guinea; 1989	Succeeded by Sir Serei Eri
