= Rabbie Namaliu =

Prime Minister of Papua New Guinea from 1988 to 1992

The Right Honourable Sir Rabbie Namaliu GCL KCMG PC
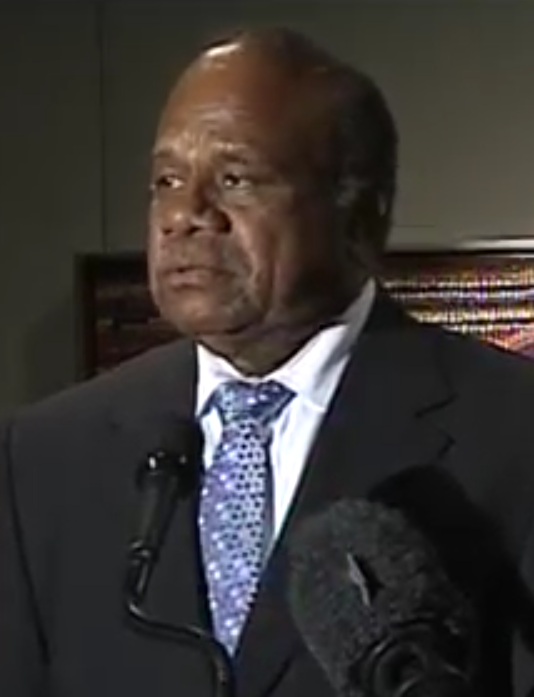
- Namaliu in 2012

4th Prime Minister of Papua New Guinea
- In office 4 July 1988 – 17 July 1992
- Monarch: Elizabeth II
- Governors General: Sir Kingsford Dibela; Sir Ignatius Kilage; Sir Vincent Eri; Sir Wiwa Korowi
- Preceded by: Paias Wingti
- Succeeded by: Paias Wingti

Personal details
- Born: Rabbie Langanai Namaliu; 3 April 1947 East New Britain Province, Territory of New Guinea (now Papua New Guinea)
- Died: 31 March 2023 (aged 75) Rabaul, Papua New Guinea
- Party: Pangu
- Spouse: Margaret Nakikus (died 1992)
- Children: 6
- Education: University of Papua New Guinea; University of Victoria

Sir Rabbie Langanai Namaliu GCL KCMG PC (3 April 1947 – 31 March 2023) was a Papua New Guinean politician. He served as the fourth prime minister of Papua New Guinea from 4 July 1988 to 17 July 1992 as leader of the Pangu Party.

== Biography ==
Namaliu was born in East New Britain Province, Territory of New Guinea on 3 April 1947. An ethnic Tolai, Namaliu came from East New Britain. He was educated in Papua New Guinea and in Canada, at the University of Victoria in Victoria, British Columbia. Prior to his political career he was an academic in the field of political science at the University of Papua New Guinea.

After Papua New Guinea's independence in 1975, Namaliu was one of four leading civil servants, together with Mekere Morauta, Anthony Siaguru, and Charles Lepani who led the formation of public administration and public policy in PNG's immediate post-independence years. They were often called "Gang of Four".

Before becoming prime minister, he served as foreign minister for the first time, from 1982 to 1984, by this time beginning his long alliance with Michael Somare, who was prime minister at that time and served as foreign minister while Namaliu was prime minister. Namaliu was appointed Leader of the Opposition in June 1988. and replaced Paias Wingti as the Prime Minister in July 1988.

He was appointed foreign minister in 2002, as part of the National Alliance Party government of Michael Somare. He served as foreign minister until 12 July 2006 when he became finance minister during a cabinet reshuffle. Namaliu subsequently lost his seat of Kokopo Open at the 2007 Election but had not ruled out a future return to politics. He lost his cabinet post when the new government, again led by Somare, took office in August 2007.

As a former prime minister of Papua New Guinea, he was a member of the Privy Council of the United Kingdom from 1989, and was styled "The Right Honourable" with the postnominal letters 'P.C.'.

Namaliu married the civil servant, Margaret Nakikus, in 1987. She headed the country's National Planning Office. They had two son and a daughter. After his defeat in parliament in 1992 he left politics to be with Nakikus, who had incurable leukaemia and was in hospital in Brisbane, Australia. She died in 1992.

Namaliu died on 31 March 2023, at the age of 75 about 3 days before his 76th birthday.

Political offices
Preceded by Paias Wingti	Prime Minister of Papua New Guinea; 1988–1992	Succeeded by Paias Wingti
National Parliament of Papua New Guinea
Preceded by Bill Skate	Speaker of the National Parliament of Papua New Guinea; 1994–1997	Succeeded by John Pundari
