= Members of the National Parliament of Papua New Guinea, 1972–1977 =

Members were initially elected to the colonial House of Assembly of Papua and New Guinea at the 1972 election. Papua New Guinea gained independence on 16 September 1975, midway through the five-year term. At independence, the body was renamed to the National Parliament of Papua New Guinea and members continued in office to serve out the remainder of their terms.

This is a list of members of the House of Assembly from 1972 to 1975 and the National Parliament from 1975 to 1977.

== List of Members ==
Member	Electorate	Province
Josephine Abaijah	Central Provincial	Central
Tei Abal	Wabag Open	Enga
Gideon Apeng	Huon Gulf Open	Morobe
Paulus Arek (Note: Arek died of cancer on 22 November 1973. His brother, Sergius Arek, won the resulting by-election in 1974.)	Ijivitari Open	Northern
Sergius Arek	Ijivitari Open	Northern
Brere Awol	West Sepik Coastal Open	West Sepik
Kui Baiyang	Middle Ramu Open	Madang
Onamauta Beibe	Obura Open	Eastern Highlands
Raphael Bele	Central Bougainville Open	Bougainville
Yano Belo	Kagua-Erave Open	Southern Highlands
Angmai Bilas	Madang Open	Madang
Obed Boas	New Ireland Provincial	New Ireland
Ninkama Bomai	Gumine Open	Chimbu
Karigl Bonggere	Mount Milhelm Open	Chimbu
Phillip Buseng	Markham Open	Morobe
Julius Chan	Namatanai Open	New Ireland
Mackenzie Daugi	Northern Provincial	Northern
Kaibelt Diria	Wahgi Open	Western Highlands
Inuabe Egaiano	Karimui-Nomane Open	Chimbu
Bill Eichorn	Angoram Open	East Sepik
Tom Ellis	Official Member	–
John Fifita	Kula Open	Milne Bay
Sinake Giregire	Daulo Open	Eastern Highlands
John Guise	Alotau Open	Milne Bay
Gedisa Gwaju	Bulolo Open	Morobe
Barry Holloway	Eastern Highlands Provincial	Eastern Highlands
Harry Humphreys	Talasea Open	West New Britain
Toni Ila	Lae Open	Morobe
Bruce Jephcott	Madang Provincial	Madang
Amenao Jongombei	Nawae Open	Morobe
Pato Kakaraya	Wapenamanda Open	Enga
Kobale Kale	Sinasina Open	Chimbu
Toromble Kabai	Dreikikir Open	East Sepik
John Kaputin	Rabaul Open	East New Britain
Anskar Karmel	Upper Sepik Open	East Sepik
Pikah Kasau	Manus Provincial	Manus
John Kaupa	Chuave Open	Chimbu
Thomas Kavali	Jimi Open	Western Highlands
Marcus Kawo	Usino Bundi Open	Madang
William Kearney	Official Member	–
Damien Kereku	East New Britain Provincial	East New Britain
Albert Maori Kiki	Moresby Inland Open	NCD
Atiheme Kimi (Note: Kimi died in 1973. The resulting by-election was won by Bono Azanifa.)	Henganofi Open	Eastern Highlands
Bono Azanifa	Henganofi Open	Eastern Highlands
Ibne Kor	Nipa-Kutubu Open	Southern Highlands
Tom Koraea	Gulf Provincial	Gulf
Parua Kuri	Dei Open	Western Highlands
Perry Kwan	Kavieng Open	New Ireland
Paul Langro	West Sepik Provincial	West Sepik
Paul Lapun	South Bougainville Open	Bougainville
Tore Lokoloko	Kerema Open	Gulf
Joseph Luanga	Kundiawa Open	Chimbu
Pita Lus	Maprik Open	East Sepik
Waitea Magnolias	Lagaip Open	Eastern Highlands
Naipuri Maina	Western Provincial	Western
Popou Malengudoi	Finschhafen Open	Morobe
John Maneke	West New Britain Provincial	West New Britain
Koitaga Mano	Tambul-Nebilyer Open	Western Highlands
Traimya Manyingiwa	Kompiam Baiyer Open	Enga
Galopo Masa	Kandrian-Gloucester Open	West New Britain
John Matik	Wosera-Gawi Open	East Sepik
Akepa Miakwe	Goroka Open	Eastern Highlands
John Middleton	Sumkar Open	Madang
Donatus Mola	North Bougainville Open	Bougainville
Fr John Momis	Bougainville Provincial	Bougainville
Louis Mona	Goilala Open	Central
Ron Neville	Southern Highlands Provincial	Southern Highlands
Anthony Newman	Official Member	–
Mek Nugints	Mul Open	Western Highlands
Iambakey Okuk	Chimbu Provincial	Chimbu
Ebia Olewale	South Fly Open	Western
Thomas O'Shannessy	Wewak Open	East Sepik
Suinavi Otio	Lufa Open	Eastern Highlands
Pena Ou	Hagen Open	Western Highlands
Momei Pangial	Mendi Open	Southern Highlands
Anton Parao	Western Highlands Provincial	Western Highlands
Nenk Pasul	Kandep Porgera Open	Enga
John Poe	Rai Coast Open	Madang
John Pokia	Okapa Open	Eastern Highlands
Michael Pondros	Manus Open	Manus
Gavera Rea	Moresby Coastal Open	NCD
Harry Ritchie	Official Member	–
Boyamo Sali	Morobe Provincial	Morobe
Moses Sasakila (Note: Sasakila lost his seat in September 1976 after failing to submit his annual return by the required deadline. He was reinstated in November 1976 after a court appeal.)	Kainantu Open	Eastern Highlands
Buaki Singeri	Kabwum Open	Morobe
Ron Slaughter (Note: On 8 August 1972, the National Court voided the election of Slaughter. However, he won the resulting by-election in 1973.)	Kairuku-Hiri Open	Central
Michael Somare	East Sepik Provincial	East Sepik
Steven Tago	Sohe Open	Northern
Yakob Talis	Wapei Nuku Open	West Sepik
Oscar Tammur	Kokopo Open	East New Britain
Reuben Taureka	Rigo-Abau Open	Central
Matthias Toliman (Note: Toliman died in September 1973. The resulting by-election was won by Martin Tovadek.)	Gazelle Open	East New Britain
Martin Tovadek	Gazelle Open	East New Britain
Stanis Toliman	Bogia Open	Madang
Bewa Tou	Bewani Open	West Sepik
Awali Ungunaibe (Note: Awali Ungunaibe died in 1975. His brother Tombol Ungunaibe won the resulting by-election.)	Poroma-Kutubu Open	Southern Highlands
Tombol Ungunaibe	Poroma-Kutubu Open	Southern Highlands
Koriam Urekit	Pomio Open	East New Britain
Manasseh Voeto	Menyamya Open	Morobe
Andrew Wabiria	Koroba-Lake Kopiago Open	Southern Highlands
Tim Ward	Esa'ala Open	Milne Bay
Turi Wari	Ialibu-Pangia Open	Southern Highlands
Dodobai Wautai	Kikori Open	Gulf
Wena Wili	Kerowagi Open	Chimbu
Krenem Wonhenai	North Fly Open	Western Province
Matias Yaliwan	Yangoru-Saussia Open	East Sepik
Dennis Young	Milne Bay Provincial	Milne Bay
Matiabe Yuwi	Tari-Komo Open	Southern Highlands
