= 1972 Papua New Guinean general election =

General elections were held in the Territory of Papua and New Guinea between 19 February and 11 March 1972. They saw the election of the country's first female MP, Josephine Abaijah.

== Electoral system ==
The House of Assembly was expanded from 94 to 107 members, consisting of 100 elected members, four civil servants and three members nominated by members of the House to represent special interest groups. The 100 elected members were elected from 82 open constituencies and 18 regional constituencies, from each of which a single member was elected by Instant-runoff voting. Voters could vote for a candidate in both their local open constituency and the regional constituency covering their area. Candidacy in the regional constituencies was limited to people who had received the Intermediate Certificate (or an equivalent) from school.

Prior to the elections, the voting age was lowered from 21 to 18. A total of 1,384,780 voters were enrolled.

To reduce the reliance on 'whispered' votes (in which illiterate voters told polling officials who they wished to vote for), photos of the candidates were added to ballot papers.

== Campaign ==
A total of 611 candidates contested the 100 seats in the House of Assembly, of which four were women and 74 were incumbents running for re-election. Two seats – East Sepik Regional and West Sepik Coastal Open – had only one candidate, both of whom (Michael Somare of the Pangu Party and Brere Awol respectively) were returned unopposed. Incumbent MP for Morobe Regional, Tony Voutas, chose not to run after becoming an official within the Pangu Party. Other incumbents stepping down included Percy Chatterton (Moresby Open).

== Results ==
Only 38 of the 72 incumbents that contested the elections were re-elected. The new House of Assembly had 37 members of the United Party, 11 from the People's Progress Party, 18 members of the Pangu Party, 8 members of the Niugini National Party, and 3 from the Mataungan Association.

Results by constituency
Constituency	Candidate	First pref	After prefs	Notes
Alotau Open	John Guise	9,604	9,604	Elected
Alotau Open	Maikel Kaniniba	637		
Alotau Open	Osineru Dickson	573		
Alotau Open	Invalid votes	792		
Angoram Open	Bill Eichhorn	4,105	4,778	Elected
Angoram Open	Joe Kenni	3,143	3,800	
Angoram Open	Jim	2,148		
Angoram Open	Daniel Guren	750		
Angoram Open	Maski Kasikamon	555		
Angoram Open	Pita Jonsen	508		
Angoram Open	Invalid votes	233		
Bewani Open	Bewa Tou	3,979		Elected
Bewani Open	Glammis Inohha	3,177		
Bewani Open	Invalid votes	0		
Bogia Open	Stanis Toliman	5,053	5,143	Elected
Bogia Open	Goragora Kopara	1,977	1,997	
Bogia Open	Alfred Ararua	1,492	1,756	
Bogia Open	Philip Magado	812	838	
Bogia Open	Yamun Bingi	493	524	
Bogia Open	Tom Maguna	488		
Bogia Open	Invalid votes	102		
Bougainville Provincial	John Momis	20,952		Elected
Bougainville Provincial	Joseph Lue	3,771		
Bougainville Provincial	Invalid votes	1,611		
Bulolo Open	Ben Dangu	2,585	3,362	
Bulolo Open	Gedisa Gwaju	2,187	3,418	Elected
Bulolo Open	Gias Umbu	1,410		
Bulolo Open	Dennis Brown	1,175		
Bulolo Open	Anani Maino	701		
Bulolo Open	Eric Robson	588		
Bulolo Open	Rikani Hapiango	503		
Bulolo Open	Mbawa Yenduabo	456		
Bulolo Open	Mangobing Kakum	428		
Bulolo Open	Umbi Dandas	428		
Bulolo Open	Guyo Saweo	420		
Bulolo Open	Apeo Motanatau	83		
Bulolo Open	Invalid votes	541		
Central Bougainville Open	Raphael Bele	3,010	3,641	Elected
Central Bougainville Open	Barry Middlemiss	1,647	1,917	
Central Bougainville Open	Henry Moses	1,175		
Central Bougainville Open	Raphael Niniku	635		
Central Bougainville Open	Joseph Baraka	327		
Central Bougainville Open	Invalid votes	611		
Central Provincial	Josephine Abaijah	16,011	19,845	Elected
Central Provincial	F.D "Andy" Anderson	6,744	9,183	
Central Provincial	Tom Rosser	5,516	7,107	
Central Provincial	Kevin Javia Zomai	5,434		
Central Provincial	Bill Fielding	5,129		
Central Provincial	Kevin Fletcher	3,294		
Central Provincial	Maikel (Pita) Galli	1,603		
Central Provincial	Invalid votes	5,104		
Chimbu Provincial	Iambakey Okuk	10,757	12,696	Elected
Chimbu Provincial	Waru Degemba	10,249	10,872	
Chimbu Provincial	Gigmai N.J Bal	7,200		
Chimbu Provincial	Ignatius Kilage	6,856		
Chimbu Provincial	Numambo Siune	5,003		
Chimbu Provincial	Invalid votes	22,591		
Chuave Open	John Kaupa	2,734	3,528	Elected
Chuave Open	Emmanuel K. Suakere	1,544	2,410	
Chuave Open	Uauwi Wauwe Moses	1,437		
Chuave Open	Komane Teimai	1,320		
Chuave Open	Mai Goro	1,077		
Chuave Open	Kopori Kari	820		
Chuave Open	John Michael Wani	768		
Chuave Open	Girimai Teine	750		
Chuave Open	Teine John	712		
Chuave Open	Da Jufugao	604		
Chuave Open	Tabie	429		
Chuave Open	Invalid votes	94		
Daulo Open	Sinake Giregire	3,508	3,622	Elected
Daulo Open	Anis Romude	1,249	1,252	
Daulo Open	Ikime Baro	763	965	
Daulo Open	Sitak Watavilo	685	691	
Daulo Open	Nomane Ombwa	471		
Daulo Open	Mondie Lowairo	438	540	
Daulo Open	Kondo Omba	328		
Daulo Open	Invalid votes	9		
Dei Open	Parua Kuri	2,131	3,468	Elected
Dei Open	Gapa Wai	1,819	2,897	
Dei Open	Pim	1,422		
Dei Open	John Malts	1,111		
Dei Open	Wariki Wama	900		
Dei Open	Kuma Toga	820		
Dei Open	Tei Kome	690		
Dei Open	Invalid votes	11		
Dreikikir Open	Toromble Kabai	2,183	2,499	Elected
Dreikikir Open	Aisimboro Ston	1,253	1,564	
Dreikikir Open	Cista Hapeli	722		
Dreikikir Open	Kokomo Ulia	619		
Dreikikir Open	Dam Hormetele	420		
Dreikikir Open	Invalid votes	83		
East New Britain Provincial	Damien Kereku	16,607		Elected
East New Britain Provincial	Samson Patiliu	12,348		
East New Britain Provincial	Invalid votes	9,116		
East Sepik Provincial	Michael Somare	–	–	Elected
Eastern Highlands Provincial	Barry Holloway	31,058	31,836	Elected
Eastern Highlands Provincial	Dennis Buchanan	20,163	20,979	
Eastern Highlands Provincial	Kevin Masive	6,664	6,999	
Eastern Highlands Provincial	K. Hariepe Tereyamo	6,537		
Eastern Highlands Provincial	Patrick J. Gehapine	1,640		
Eastern Highlands Provincial	Invalid votes	5,083		
Esa'ala Open	Tim Ward	3,331	3,816	Elected
Esa'ala Open	Henry P. Andrew	1,305	1,833	
Esa'ala Open	Roy Kaitolele	1,241		
Esa'ala Open	Boitau Somale	1,236	1,605	
Esa'ala Open	Jack Wilkinson	738		
Esa'ala Open	Enosi Baloiloi	494		
Esa'ala Open	Joseph Nimagore	409		
Esa'ala Open	John Rae	261		
Esa'ala Open	Invalid votes	527		
Finschhafen Open	Popou Malenggudoi	3,471	3,915	
Finschhafen Open	Waliong Buga'ong	1,944	3,045	Elected
Finschhafen Open	Simon Baur	1,883		
Finschhafen Open	Zibang Sifuyu Zurenuo	1,508		
Finschhafen Open	Somu Sigob	1,418		
Finschhafen Open	Darius Nako Cook	1,284		
Finschhafen Open	Oku Zanezia	1,097		
Finschhafen Open	Meck Singiliong	850		
Finschhafen Open	Simongi Kangiong	764		
Finschhafen Open	Linoge Hebaumu	614		
Finschhafen Open	Hesingut B. Wangu	520		
Finschhafen Open	Invalid votes	717		
Gazelle Open	Matthias Toliman	3,284	4,062	Elected
Gazelle Open	Blasius Turgone	2,832	2,925	
Gazelle Open	Nason ToKiala	1,151		
Gazelle Open	John Tarutia	363		
Gazelle Open	Invalid votes	516		
Goilala Open	Louis Mona	4,554	5,371	Elected
Goilala Open	Eriko Rarupu	2,698	3,486	
Goilala Open	T. Kaga Lauva	1,705		
Goilala Open	Enga Suda	1,545		
Goilala Open	Invalid votes	134		
Goroka Open	Akepa Miakwe	2,128	3,910	Elected
Goroka Open	Sabumei Kofikai	2,117	3,308	
Goroka Open	Koni Aize	1,771		
Goroka Open	Lomdopa Heve	1,435		
Goroka Open	Soso Subi	1,367		
Goroka Open	Isembo O. Nateva	1,248		
Goroka Open	Iyape Noruka	1,023		
Goroka Open	Bulumakau Longani	925		
Goroka Open	John Akunai	924		
Goroka Open	Sekeyaro	695		
Goroka Open	Bin Aravaki	431		
Goroka Open	Nogo Susuke	322		
Goroka Open	Invalid votes	164		
Gulf Provincial	Tom Koraea	5,464	7,524	Elected
Gulf Provincial	Wilson Patricia	4,767	5,902	
Gulf Provincial	V. B Counsel	4,009		
Gulf Provincial	Charles Karava	2,174		
Gulf Provincial	Invalid votes	803		
Gumine Open	Ninkama Bomai	2,484	3,454	Elected
Gumine Open	Kuman Dai	1,512	1,846	
Gumine Open	Nilkare Kaupa	1,290		
Gumine Open	Wemin Aure	950		
Gumine Open	Dege Kobita	920		
Gumine Open	Gari Kumulga	896		
Gumine Open	Amos Tongia Kabe	833		
Gumine Open	Biria Kia	727		
Gumine Open	Sine Gomuna	552		
Gumine Open	Mol Gari	477		
Gumine Open	Lukas Kaupa Kiruai	386		
Gumine Open	Kua Galmai	342		
Gumine Open	Kaupa Ninkama	276		
Gumine Open	Kawale Winiga	49		
Gumine Open	Invalid votes	86		
Hagen Open	John Colman (Kolmans)	2,553	4,549	
Hagen Open	Ogla Makindi	2,035		
Hagen Open	Pena Ou	2,002	4,816	Elected
Hagen Open	Minembi Ken	1,568		
Hagen Open	Wamp Wan	1,429		
Hagen Open	Komp Dei	1,349		
Hagen Open	Koim Kip	1,337		
Hagen Open	Wak Kumbamung	1,221		
Hagen Open	Namp Opa	1,143		
Hagen Open	Kopey Mong	980		
Hagen Open	Denbis	299		
Hagen Open	Debra Waya	128		
Hagen Open	Invalid votes	81		
Henganofi Open	Bono Azanifa	1,965	2,476	
Henganofi Open	Atiheme Kimi	1,483	2,482	Elected
Henganofi Open	Tutueva Kasemu	1,241		
Henganofi Open	Kangeto Yabise	1,188		
Henganofi Open	Sununku Krokie	857		
Henganofi Open	Baina Meseya	610		
Henganofi Open	Oto Tofevfe	595		
Henganofi Open	Menema Nogoe	568		
Henganofi Open	Kutanama Yayameso	562		
Henganofi Open	Invalid votes	52		
Huon Gulf Open	Gideon Apeng	3,076	3,534	Elected
Huon Gulf Open	Pure Pinganoma	2,652	2,915	
Huon Gulf Open	Nelson Wazob Nimolen	1,373		
Huon Gulf Open	Osia Gason	853		
Huon Gulf Open	Gaga Nappa	535		
Huon Gulf Open	Invalid votes	54		
Ialibu Pangia Open	Koke Itua	4,481	7,094	
Ialibu Pangia Open	Turi Wari	4,348	7,522	Elected
Ialibu Pangia Open	Ranguma Oma	2,115		
Ialibu Pangia Open	Pangano Suma	1,914		
Ialibu Pangia Open	Glaimi Warena	1,763		
Ialibu Pangia Open	Rambu Melo	1,080		
Ialibu Pangia Open	Undi Nandi	1,021		
Ialibu Pangia Open	Kiboi Wanu	788		
Ialibu Pangia Open	Yoge Maga	781		
Ialibu Pangia Open	Invalid votes	103		
Ijivitari Open	Paulus Arek	4,071		Elected
Ijivitari Open	Edric Eupu	2,593		
Ijivitari Open	Invalid votes	189		
Jimi Open	Thomas Kavali	5,724		Elected
Jimi Open	James Kuru Kupul	5,160		
Jimi Open	Invalid votes	47		
Kabwum Open	Buaki Singeri	3,392	4,503	Elected
Kabwum Open	Franzing Ansawang	2,288	2,691	
Kabwum Open	Wale Asa	1,612		
Kabwum Open	Rauke Gam	1,609		
Kabwum Open	Zerienang Kumi Galunga	560		
Kabwum Open	Barnabus Kuso	330		
Kabwum Open	Invalid votes	49		
Kagua Erave Open	Yano Belo	9,086		Elected
Kagua Erave Open	Mata Mura	2,473		
Kagua Erave Open	Tamanae Ipinipe	1,464		
Kagua Erave Open	Wagunabo Merepo	1,122		
Kagua Erave Open	Invalid votes	50		
Kainantu Open	Moses Sasakila	4,521	5,408	Elected
Kainantu Open	Wiwinu	2,256	2,769	
Kainantu Open	Karo Koko'aiyo	1,462		
Kainantu Open	Nembosi	1,335		
Kainantu Open	Ono Aia	1,022		
Kainantu Open	Juraina	791		
Kainantu Open	Bun	455		
Kainantu Open	Invalid votes	197		
Kairuku-Hiri Open	Result invalidated (Note: The seat was won by Ron Slaughter after the redistribution of preferences, but the result was successfully challenged in court by losing candidate Charlie Maino Auki on the basis that the number of ballots destroyed in an accident involving a ballot box being dropped in a river was greater than Slaughter's margin of victory. Slaughter won a by-election the following year.)			
Kandep Porgera Open	Nenk Pasul	3,223	4,994	Elected
Kandep Porgera Open	Amo Wangariti	1,992		
Kandep Porgera Open	Taru Yapogan	1,905	3,167	
Kandep Porgera Open	Was Per	1,512		
Kandep Porgera Open	Torp Male	1,322		
Kandep Porgera Open	Kandu Pope	1,198		
Kandep Porgera Open	Yala Yandape	899		
Kandep Porgera Open	Andi Plower	694		
Kandep Porgera Open	Manasa Piagori Kii	612		
Kandep Porgera Open	Liwa Komapu	565		
Kandep Porgera Open	Invalid votes	34		
Kandrian Gloucester Open	James Simon Vora Ayong	2,219	3,062	
Kandrian Gloucester Open	Galopo Masa	2,160	3,212	Elected
Kandrian Gloucester Open	Mombi Maringle	1,049		
Kandrian Gloucester Open	Aisapo Talavi	989		
Kandrian Gloucester Open	Pele Taul	762		
Kandrian Gloucester Open	Invalid votes	36		
Karimui Nomane Open	Inuabe Egaiano	2,672	2,709	Elected
Karimui Nomane Open	Birial Welebi	2,041	2,159	
Karimui Nomane Open	Nebare Kamun	1,311		
Karimui Nomane Open	Alua Yori	922		
Karimui Nomane Open	Homeri Kaupa	645		
Karimui Nomane Open	Tine Boi	423		
Karimui Nomane Open	Galamai Boi	390		
Karimui Nomane Open	Invalid votes	56		
Kavieng Open	Perry Kwan	4,483		Elected
Kavieng Open	Chris Rangatin	2,473		
Kavieng Open	Lawrence Maris	665		
Kavieng Open	Sirenda Appasai	632		
Kavieng Open	Invalid votes	647		
Kerema Open	Tore Lokoloko	3,752	4,110	Elected
Kerema Open	Mahiro Kivovia	2,089	2,433	
Kerema Open	Semese Ivaraoa	1,294	1,638	
Kerema Open	Francis Pao Maiu	754		
Kerema Open	Joseph Morehari Haro	683		
Kerema Open	Gabriel Ehava Karava	582		
Kerema Open	Invalid votes	335		
Kerowagi Open	Wena Wili	2,008	2,814	Elected
Kerowagi Open	Siwi Kurondo	1,716	2,709	
Kerowagi Open	Kagl Kindagl	1,127		
Kerowagi Open	Mende Auru	1,111		
Kerowagi Open	Danga Bagme Mondo	519		
Kerowagi Open	Damba Endemongo	212		
Kerowagi Open	Invalid votes	34		
Kikori Open	Nuae Ou'u	1,712		
Kikori Open	Dodobai Wautai	1,533	3,029	Elected
Kikori Open	Kareva Lavaro	1,441	2,817	
Kikori Open	Ope Oeaka	1,102		
Kikori Open	Peni Bori	674		
Kikori Open	Ivia Laura	628		
Kikori Open	Ipai Kairi	451		
Kikori Open	Invalid votes	259		
Kokopo Open	Oscar Tammur	3,928		Elected
Kokopo Open	Meriba Tomakala	1,630		
Kokopo Open	Leonard Tarum	529		
Kokopo Open	Nellie Exon Lawrence	364		
Kokopo Open	E. Tade	250		
Kokopo Open	Boas Tipaul	209		
Kokopo Open	Invalid votes	685		
Kompiam Baiyer	Traimya Manyingiwa	4,527	5,939	Elected
Kompiam Baiyer	Minoko Leangun	2,086	3,285	
Kompiam Baiyer	Paraka Nyi	1,788		
Kompiam Baiyer	Amai Kembena	1,484		
Kompiam Baiyer	Trakyowa Palimo	1,438		
Kompiam Baiyer	Pone	1,132		
Kompiam Baiyer	John Andui	777		
Kompiam Baiyer	Nanowa Lopowa	401		
Kompiam Baiyer	Buru	282		
Kompiam Baiyer	Mako Kapoa	181		
Kompiam Baiyer	Invalid votes	49		
Koroba Kopiago Open	Andrew Wabiria	5,093	6,967	Elected
Koroba Kopiago Open	Piko Matiabe	2,662		
Koroba Kopiago Open	Paiyali Elo	2,202	4,043	
Koroba Kopiago Open	Peta	2,088		
Koroba Kopiago Open	Paku	1,279		
Koroba Kopiago Open	Invalid votes	74		
Kula Open	John Fifita	2,580	4,057	
Kula Open	Solomon	2,034	3,283	
Kula Open	Thomas	1,488		
Kula Open	Noah Teliwa Tengwe	1,159		Elected
Kula Open	Lepani Watson	1,043		
Kula Open	Amenoni Izod	694		
Kula Open	Inia	590		
Kula Open	Invalid votes	665		
Kundiawa Open	Delba Biri	1,410	2,153	
Kundiawa Open	Kugame Kura	1,329		
Kundiawa Open	Kumo Siune	1,287		
Kundiawa Open	Joseph Luanga	1,232	2,293	Elected
Kundiawa Open	Kawage Kendey	1,040		
Kundiawa Open	Wel Diwi	906		
Kundiawa Open	Kiagi Kawage	714		
Kundiawa Open	Aina Kanua	640		
Kundiawa Open	Daga Kindine	623		
Kundiawa Open	Kaman Au	397		
Kundiawa Open	Kantikane Endekan	312		
Kundiawa Open	Invalid votes	143		
Lae Open	Toni Ila	4,707		Elected
Lae Open	Eki Vaki	1,547		
Lae Open	Stephen Ahi	1,145		
Lae Open	Brian Bogagu	581		
Lae Open	Luther Karo Ahi	306		
Lae Open	Invalid votes	685		
Lagaip Open	Perano Pisa	2,965	3,535	
Lagaip Open	Leo Laku	2,433		
Lagaip Open	Waitea Magnolias	2,303	4,077	Elected
Lagaip Open	Don Kapi	1,511		
Lagaip Open	Moses Kambun	1,180		
Lagaip Open	Kopene Yanda	796		
Lagaip Open	Poio Iuri	719		
Lagaip Open	Inunk Mailu	156		
Lagaip Open	Invalid votes	43		
Lufa Open	Pupuna Aruno	2,494	3,455	
Lufa Open	Suinavi Otio	1,761	3,756	Elected
Lufa Open	Kumoro Vira	1,469		
Lufa Open	L. James Yanepa	1,444		
Lufa Open	Humi (Tevenale) Atipu	1,269		
Lufa Open	Moses Aikaba	1,144		
Lufa Open	Kafia Kemiepa	793		
Lufa Open	Bino Fumapa	696		
Lufa Open	Lame Aokiwa	611		
Lufa Open	Saksak Legu	92		
Lufa Open	Invalid votes	9		
Madang Open	Angmai Bilas	3,485	3,589	Elected
Madang Open	Job	1,976	2,045	
Madang Open	Aksim Siming	532	615	
Madang Open	Phil Hancock	501	647	
Madang Open	Kaukesa Kamo	455		
Madang Open	Hon Pipoi	203		
Madang Open	Invalid votes	526		
Madang Provincial	Bruce Jephcott	29,548		Elected
Madang Provincial	Shong Babob	10,797		
Madang Provincial	Jerry Kaon	9,194		
Madang Provincial	Invalid votes	0		
Manus Open	Michael Pondros	1,978	2,241	Elected
Manus Open	Peter Pomat	1,788	2,155	
Manus Open	Paliau Maloat	1,786		
Manus Open	Joel Maiah	1,435		
Manus Open	J.B Cholai Popunau	532		
Manus Open	Silih Sawi	149		
Manus Open	Invalid votes	266		
Manus Provincial	Pikah Kasau	2,348	2,569	Elected
Manus Provincial	Silas Pokupen Samuel	2,100	2,348	
Manus Provincial	Richard Selan Litau	1,665		
Manus Provincial	Arnold Masipal	1,524		
Manus Provincial	Invalid votes	294		
Maprik Open	Pita Lus	4,702		Elected
Maprik Open	Boigun Raki	858		
Maprik Open	Kaisman Titas Pa'apo	620		
Maprik Open	Silas Maiguna	542		
Maprik Open	Abraham Kotitaumba	523		
Maprik Open	Murray K. Phillips	286		
Maprik Open	Stephen Mairavi Walimini	267		
Maprik Open	Ulisimbi Sumbwia	246		
Maprik Open	David Nailas	93		
Maprik Open	Invalid votes	178		
Markam Open	Philip Buseng	4,406	4,784	Elected
Markam Open	Tom Leahy (Lae)	4,130	4,685	
Markam Open	W. Bibuai Waigan	696		
Markam Open	Bilum Ganguts	635		
Markam Open	Kapumi Marabuman	213		
Markam Open	Invalid votes	253		
Mendi Open	Momei Pangial	4,237	4,866	Elected
Mendi Open	Francis Kili	3,594		
Mendi Open	Posu Ank	3,372	4,478	
Mendi Open	Ebi Wari	1,800		
Mendi Open	Kisombo Pendene	1,393		
Mendi Open	Tubiri Wagep	1,389		
Mendi Open	Mark Kuna	803		
Mendi Open	Invalid votes	158		
Menyamya Open	Manasseh Voeto	5,979		Elected
Menyamya Open	Yosa Tiamipo	2,384		
Menyamya Open	Mesak Omaljamja	1,604		
Menyamya Open	Yongwia Yagwicha'abana	1,389		
Menyamya Open	Invalid votes	448		
Middle Ramu Open	Kui Baiyang	2,695	4,223	Elected
Middle Ramu Open	Wokam Rem	2,240	2,498	
Middle Ramu Open	Simon Pita Gi	1,904		
Middle Ramu Open	Ambrose Yenmoro	1,803		
Middle Ramu Open	Joseph Kunja	1,578		
Middle Ramu Open	Jeff Liversidge	595		
Middle Ramu Open	Invalid votes	40		
Milne Bay Provincial	Dennis Young	12,693		Elected
Milne Bay Provincial	Arnold Joseph	12,309		
Milne Bay Provincial	Invalid votes	6,140		
Moresby Coastal Open	Gavera Rea	2,207	3,164	Elected
Moresby Coastal Open	Sevese Oipi Morea	1,418	2,375	
Moresby Coastal Open	Mahuru Rarua Rarua	1,132		
Moresby Coastal Open	Gavera Ovia	920		
Moresby Coastal Open	Toua Kapena	714		
Moresby Coastal Open	Frank Griffin	483		
Moresby Coastal Open	Tetley Keith	316		
Moresby Coastal Open	Sogo Sebea	306		
Moresby Coastal Open	Therese Daera	261		
Moresby Coastal Open	Lohia Doriga	257		
Moresby Coastal Open	Miria Gavera	202		
Moresby Coastal Open	Invalid votes	1,270		
Moresby Inland Open	Albert Maori Kiki	3,546		Elected
Moresby Inland Open	Michael Kauga Aigal	931		
Moresby Inland Open	Dennis Brian Douglas	424		
Moresby Inland Open	Colin Buscombe	136		
Moresby Inland Open	Invalid votes	414		
Morobe Provincial	Boyamo Sali	48,393		Elected
Morobe Provincial	John Raka	18,084		
Morobe Provincial	Invalid votes	9,314		
Mount Milhelm Open	Karigl Bonggere	1,393	1,905	Elected
Mount Milhelm Open	Simon Kumai	1,268		
Mount Milhelm Open	Miugwe Bina	1,160	1,684	
Mount Milhelm Open	Yirei Kawagi	615		
Mount Milhelm Open	J. Kimagl Ongugo	265		
Mount Milhelm Open	Invalid votes	16		
Mul Open	Mek Nugints	2,697	3,266	Elected
Mul Open	Pepa Paua	1,785	2,593	
Mul Open	Auwa Nenjipa	1,564		
Mul Open	Straus Raus Roga	1,544		
Mul Open	J. Miti Rogapa	279		
Mul Open	Invalid votes	7		
Namatanai Open	Julius Chan	4,764	5,099	Elected
Namatanai Open	Bruno Leo Sasi	2,812	3,013	
Namatanai Open	Robert Seeto	2,665		
Namatanai Open	John Lasisi	379		
Namatanai Open	Invalid votes	582		
Nawae Open	Sikiong Kalisie	1,928	2,408	
Nawae Open	Amenao Jongombei	1,766	2,648	Elected
Nawae Open	Patik Nimambot	1,150		
Nawae Open	Tamae Dambin	316		
Nawae Open	Simbagi Ramiginga	120		
Nawae Open	Invalid votes	33		
New Ireland Provincial	Obed Boas	10,266		Elected
New Ireland Provincial	Wally Lussick	7,212		
New Ireland Provincial	Invalid votes	2,604		
Nipa Kutubu Open	James Sand	2,434		
Nipa Kutubu Open	Tegi Ebei'al	2,196		
Nipa Kutubu Open	Ibne Kor	2,116	4,067	Elected
Nipa Kutubu Open	Kau Lumbi	1,944	3,680	
Nipa Kutubu Open	Igila Tigi	1,249		
Nipa Kutubu Open	Mau'ei Lenep	842		
Nipa Kutubu Open	Lai Liu	617		
Nipa Kutubu Open	Kobiap Ogom	593		
Nipa Kutubu Open	Pont Humbi	478		
Nipa Kutubu Open	Kep Injera	328		
Nipa Kutubu Open	Miabe Agiwa	50		
Nipa Kutubu Open	Invalid votes	54		
North Bougainville Open	Donatus Mola	3,806	4,654	Elected
North Bougainville Open	William Kunai	2,083	2,500	
North Bougainville Open	Moses Havini	1,743		
North Bougainville Open	Samson Purupuru	1,259		
North Bougainville Open	Joseph Hapisiria	563		
North Bougainville Open	Samuel Kariup	306		
North Bougainville Open	Invalid votes	670		
North Fly Open	Dominikus Sam Kambana	3,408	4,126	
North Fly Open	Krenem Wonhenai	2,584	4,497	Elected
North Fly Open	Warren Dutton	1,803		
North Fly Open	Sam Wingen	1,713		
North Fly Open	Simik Tetra	645		
North Fly Open	Ulisini Kaindi	539		
North Fly Open	Invalid votes	98		
Northern Provincial	Mackenzie Daugi	7,181		Elected
Northern Provincial	Frank Aisi	4,094		
Northern Provincial	Cromwell Burau	2,904		
Northern Provincial	Invalid votes	757		
Obura Open	Onamauta Beibe	1,932	2,908	Elected
Obura Open	Kakurimaka Popiana	1,614	2,255	
Obura Open	Undap Maina	1,262		
Obura Open	Wesley Mataora	1,193		
Obura Open	Invalid votes	55		
Okapa Open	William Abua	2,162	3,656	
Okapa Open	Naso Fore	2,091		
Okapa Open	Muriso Warebu	1,753		
Okapa Open	Tudak Faki	1,724		
Okapa Open	Esaki Isufa	1,141		
Okapa Open	John Pokia	1,101	3,751	Elected
Okapa Open	Kege Yasinamo	1,084		
Okapa Open	Horove Au'udumu	744		
Okapa Open	Eveto Vebuloya	657		
Okapa Open	Daniel Kassa	463		
Okapa Open	Okai Aakamala	111		
Okapa Open	Invalid votes	130		
Pomio Open	Koriam Urekit	7,277		Elected
Pomio Open	Julius Taiul	1,080		
Pomio Open	Kaolea Golpak	802		
Pomio Open	John Altapua	620		
Pomio Open	Invalid votes	156		
Poroma Kutubu	Hamabo Kuri	2,353	2,811	
Poroma Kutubu	Awali Ungunaibe	2,048	3,039	Elected
Poroma Kutubu	Edward	1,453		
Poroma Kutubu	Hauko	463		
Poroma Kutubu	Invalid votes	2		
Rabaul Open	John Kaputin	7,790		Elected
Rabaul Open	Joseph Talam	2,481		
Rabaul Open	Josiah Wartovo	1,266		
Rabaul Open	Epineri Titimur	150		
Rabaul Open	Invalid votes	775		
Rai Coast Open	John Poe	4,253		Elected
Rai Coast Open	Dui Yangsai	2,072		
Rai Coast Open	Willem Sawang	910		
Rai Coast Open	Mafuk Gainda	345		
Rai Coast Open	Lumak Mapui	245		
Rai Coast Open	Iaga Bakuk	222		
Rai Coast Open	John Sillio (Jon)	48	48	
Rai Coast Open	Invalid votes	100		
Rigo Abau Open	Reuben Taureka	3,331	4,818	Elected
Rigo Abau Open	Dirona Abe	2,587	3,118	
Rigo Abau Open	Cliff Ianamu	1,978		
Rigo Abau Open	Willie Dihm	1,658		
Rigo Abau Open	Koni Marai	805		
Rigo Abau Open	Harry Lewis	782		
Rigo Abau Open	Scotty Uroe	628		
Rigo Abau Open	Naime Doko	616		
Rigo Abau Open	Moere Raikarawa	535		
Rigo Abau Open	Kila Mareva	509		
Rigo Abau Open	James Cima Kepo	305		
Rigo Abau Open	Invalid votes	0		
Sinasina Open	Kelaga Eremuge	1,450	2,041	
Sinasina Open	Gabe Uba	1,288		
Sinasina Open	Kobale Kale	1,095	2,174	Elected
Sinasina Open	Korul Wauwe	770		
Sinasina Open	Komi Leo Miamil	768		
Sinasina Open	Ilai Buge	685		
Sinasina Open	Kalale Wel	655		
Sinasina Open	Konia Kum	590		
Sinasina Open	Dom Gela	414		
Sinasina Open	Kauba (Driver)	411		
Sinasina Open	Kom Yogol	399		
Sinasina Open	Clement Kwipa Poye	62		
Sinasina Open	Invalid votes	73		
Sohe Open	Stephen Tago	2,854	3,292	Elected
Sohe Open	Wilson Suja	1,961	2,153	
Sohe Open	Benson Toroi	1,663		
Sohe Open	Andrew Ririka	854		
Sohe Open	Gerald Lodi	239		
Sohe Open	Asina Papau	144		
Sohe Open	Invalid votes	368		
South Bougainville Open	Paul Lapun	4,464		Elected
South Bougainville Open	Andrew Komoro Ukevi	2,117		
South Bougainville Open	Aloysius Noga	1,125		
South Bougainville Open	Pinoko Sipisong	815		
South Bougainville Open	Invalid votes	31		
South Fly Open	Ebia Olewale	5,931	6,020	Elected
South Fly Open	Serese Bani	3,059	3,076	
South Fly Open	Arthur Thomas Wyborn	1,417	1,461	
South Fly Open	Simoi Paradi	915	941	
South Fly Open	Robert Tabua	367	407	
South Fly Open	Samuel Kloney	345		
South Fly Open	Invalid votes	1,090		
Southern Highlands Provincial	Ron Neville	62,805		Elected
Southern Highlands Provincial	Karipe Haawe Pitzz	11,958		
Southern Highlands Provincial	James Waia	5,863		
Southern Highlands Provincial	Joseph Ango Haiyako	3,570		
Southern Highlands Provincial	Invalid votes	12,143		
Sumkar Open	John Middleton	6,118		Elected
Sumkar Open	Kare-Maor	2,696		
Sumkar Open	Rawad Marun	1,343		
Sumkar Open	Suguman Matibiri	428		
Sumkar Open	Invalid votes	443		
Talasea Open	Harry Humphreys	3,826	4,361	Elected
Talasea Open	Soa Ubia	1,210	1,481	
Talasea Open	Theodore Kaiwa	1,063	1,289	
Talasea Open	Peni Ase	981		
Talasea Open	James Towaninara	744	1,198	
Talasea Open	Morris Ling	730		
Talasea Open	Pitar Simogun	721		
Talasea Open	Maus Bala	507		
Talasea Open	Maranglik Tobob	141		
Talasea Open	Invalid votes	349		
Tambul Nebilyer Open	Kandalip Yagimbu	4,253	4,948	
Tambul Nebilyer Open	Koitaga Mano	3,512	5,178	Elected
Tambul Nebilyer Open	Kagul	2,309		
Tambul Nebilyer Open	Raim Kewa	2,113		
Tambul Nebilyer Open	Rambai Keruwa	1,545		
Tambul Nebilyer Open	Kiap Morau	1,189		
Tambul Nebilyer Open	Invalid votes	8		
Tari Komo Open	Matiabe Yuwi	5,308	8,120	Elected
Tari Komo Open	Tandiago Waragoli	2,335	2,839	
Tari Komo Open	Aya Dabuma Dabuma	2,075	2,784	
Tari Komo Open	Andrew Andaija Aiango	1,571		
Tari Komo Open	Togola Wabulu	1,509		
Tari Komo Open	Punga Tiri	1,359		
Tari Komo Open	Henry Hingery	906		
Tari Komo Open	Invalid votes	49		
Upper Sepik Open	Anskar Karmel	2,537	4,030	Elected
Upper Sepik Open	Ambet Atapu	2,269	3,024	
Upper Sepik Open	Wesani Iwoksim	1,835		
Upper Sepik Open	Nauwi Sauinambi	1,518		
Upper Sepik Open	Harry Weldon	1,151		
Upper Sepik Open	Silas Neksep	860		
Upper Sepik Open	Diyos Wapnok	774		
Upper Sepik Open	Markis Tinerok	545		
Upper Sepik Open	Rob Roy Keura	170		
Upper Sepik Open	Invalid votes	248		
Usino Bundi Open	Marcus Kawo	2,787	2,927	Elected
Usino Bundi Open	Tongia	1,359		
Usino Bundi Open	Umbaria-Waikiripa	1,038		
Usino Bundi Open	Tugo	973		
Usino Bundi Open	Uririp Dumeni	920	1,602	
Usino Bundi Open	Usisip Simukaip	766		
Usino Bundi Open	Invalid votes	75		
Wabag Open	Tei Abal	10,277		Elected
Wabag Open	James Sikin	1,428		
Wabag Open	Peter Amean	628		
Wabag Open	Invalid votes	62		
Wahgi Open	Kaibelt Diria	4,417	6,367	Elected
Wahgi Open	Opai Kunangel	3,811	5,010	
Wahgi Open	Timothy Ginga	1,631		
Wahgi Open	Anthony Kubul	1,541		
Wahgi Open	Nopnop Tol	1,253		
Wahgi Open	Andrew Sowelu	523		
Wahgi Open	Invalid votes	57		
Wapei Nuku Open	Yakob Talis	8,661		Elected
Wapei Nuku Open	Simon Yanepei	2,179		
Wapei Nuku Open	Clement Arino	550		
Wapei Nuku Open	Makain Mo	479		
Wapei Nuku Open	John Kouye	192		
Wapei Nuku Open	Invalid votes	101		
Wapenamanda Open	Pato Kakaraya	4,693	7,191	Elected
Wapenamanda Open	Leme Iangalyo	3,178	4,605	
Wapenamanda Open	Yasima Patage	1,803		
Wapenamanda Open	Otto Tsinunk	1,446		
Wapenamanda Open	Frank Iki	1,366		
Wapenamanda Open	Kibunki Aitok	963		
Wapenamanda Open	Pavakali Tili	766		
Wapenamanda Open	Yonge Wetea	399		
Wapenamanda Open	Invalid votes	85		
West New Britain Provincial	John Maneke	5,779	7,137	Elected
West New Britain Provincial	C.F. Chan	4,106	5,272	
West New Britain Provincial	Clive Johnson	3,545		
West New Britain Provincial	Michael Ross	2,004		
West New Britain Provincial	Invalid votes	1,777		
West Sepik Coastal Open	Brere Awol	–		Elected
West Sepik Provincial	Paul Langro	21,288		Elected
West Sepik Provincial	Daniel Jon (Johns)	10,664		
West Sepik Provincial	Invalid votes	2,232		
Western Highlands Provincial	Anton Parao	71,484		Elected
Western Highlands Provincial	Paul Pora	20,900		
Western Highlands Provincial	Goemba Kot	19,835		
Western Highlands Provincial	Heni Basa	11,324		
Western Highlands Provincial	Invalid votes	16,098		
Western Provincial	Naipuri Maina	11,777		Elected
Western Provincial	Doug Pettersen	7,103		
Western Provincial	Invalid votes	5,683		
Wewak Open	Thomas O'Shannessy	2,874	3,432	Elected
Wewak Open	Donigi Samiel	997	1,486	
Wewak Open	Albert Sagom	916	1,298	
Wewak Open	Joseph Bula Simogun	708		
Wewak Open	William Ilawarry	587		
Wewak Open	Pita Maut	443		
Wewak Open	Peter Uiap	266		
Wewak Open	John Parinjo Simen	257		
Wewak Open	Labu Yaumbery	170		
Wewak Open	Tom Maraf	81		
Wewak Open	Invalid votes	264		
Wosera Gaui Open	John Matik	3,548	3,698	Elected
Wosera Gaui Open	Mattias Yambunpe	2,047	2,243	
Wosera Gaui Open	Alois Kawang	1,958		
Wosera Gaui Open	Theo Galgal	675		
Wosera Gaui Open	Alloy Taura	369		
Wosera Gaui Open	Joseph Anganjuan	144		
Wosera Gaui Open	Konkon Sibuk	130		
Wosera Gaui Open	Yambu Sangi	114		
Wosera Gaui Open	Invalid votes	174		
Yangoru Saussia Open	Matias Yaliwan	7,684		Elected
Yangoru Saussia Open	Godfried Oguiemungu	474		
Yangoru Saussia Open	Horinya Cherakau	328		
Yangoru Saussia Open	Bais Yambinangra	289		
Yangoru Saussia Open	Thomas Warimbangu	260		
Yangoru Saussia Open	Henry Walu	144		
Yangoru Saussia Open	Beibi Yembanda	73		
Yangoru Saussia Open	Invalid votes	85		
Source: Development Policy Centre

== Aftermath ==
Following the elections Michael Somare was able to form a coalition government including his Pangu Party, the People's Progress Party, the Niugini National Party, the Mataungan Association and a group of independents led by John Guise. Somare's bloc nominated Perry Kwan for the post of Speaker; Kwan won by a vote of 49–48 against United Party candidate Matthias Toliman. However, Kwan resigned from the post June, saying he was too inexperienced for the role. Barry Holloway was elected to replace him.

A new government was formed led by Somare as Deputy Chairman of the Administrator's Executive Council.

Position	Member
Deputy Chairman	Michael Somare
Minister for Agriculture	Iambakey Okuk
Minister for Business Development	Donatus Mola
Minister for Education	Ebia Olewale
Minister for Forests	Moses Sasakila
Minister for Health	Reuben Taureka
Minister for Information	Paulus Arek
Minister of the Interior	John Guise
Minister for Internal Finance	Julius Chan
Minister for Labour	Gavera Rea
Minister for Lands and Environment	Albert Maori Kiki
Minister for Local Government	Boyamo Sali
Minister for Mines	Paul Lapun
Minister for Posts and Telegraphs	Kaibelt Diria
Minister for Trade and Industry	John Poe
Minister for Transport	Bruce Jephcott
Minister for Works	Thomas Kavali
Source: Papua New Guinea Report

== See also ==
- Members of the National Parliament of Papua New Guinea, 1972–1977
