= List of members of the Papua New Guinean Parliament who died in office =

The following is a list of members of the Parliament of Papua New Guinea who died in office.

== House of Assembly (1964-1975) ==
Member	Party	Province and constituency	Date of death	Age at death (years)	Cause
Bill Bloomfield	Labor	Morobe (Kaindi)	12 February 1966	53	
Ugi Biritu	N/A	Eastern Highlands (Henganofi)	15 March 1967	30	Epileptic seizure
Kaura Duba	N/A	Western Highlands (Jimi)	26 January 1969		
Frank Henderson	Independent	Official member	21 July 1969	58	
Norman Evennett	N/A	Milne Bay (Esa'ala)	12 June 1970	40	
Atiheme Kimi	United Party	Eastern Highlands (Henganofi)	August 1973		Struck by a truck
Matthias Toliman	United Party	East New Britain (Gazelle Open)	6 September 1973	48	Heart attack
Paulus Arek	PPP	Northern (Ijivitari Open)	22 November 1973	43	Cancer
Awali Ungunaibe	United Party	Southern Highlands (Poroma-Kutubu)	January–February 1975	28	Lung cancer

== National Parliament (1975-present) ==
Member	Party	Province and constituency	Date of death	Age at death (years)	Cause
Koriam Urekit	N/A	East New Britain (Pomio)	3 December 1978	61-62	
Iambakey Okuk	National Party	Eastern Highlands (Unggai-Bena)	14 November 1986	41	Liver cancer
Harry Humphreys	Pangu Pati	West New Britain (Talasea)	1987	71	Heart attack
Billy Kepi	United Party	Eastern Highlands (Okapa)	1988		
Pius Malip	Independent	East Sepik (Ambunti-Dreikirir)	21 November 1988	28	Road accident
Jack Genia	Pangu Pati	Central (Abau)	18 July 1993	45	Malaria
Martin Thompson	League for National Advancement	Manus (Manus)	1995		
Soling Zeming	Independent	Morobe (Tewae-Siassi)	1995		
Bernard Vogae	Independent	West New Britain (Provincial)	5 March 2000		
Alois Koki	PDM	East New Britain (Pomio)	August 2000	61-62	
Louis Ambane	NAP	Chimbu (Provincial)	10 May 2003	60s	Liver fibrosis
Paul Wai	Christian Democratic Party	Western Highlands (Anglimp-South Waghi)	29 July 2003		
Bill Skate	PNC	National Capital District (Provincial)	3 January 2006	52	Stroke
Niuro Toko Sapia	Independent	Madang (Rai Coast)	28 October 2009		Brain tumour
Joe Mek Teine	National Party	Chimbu (Kundiawa)	25 April 2011		Stroke
Patrick Tammur	Independent	East New Britain (Kokopo)	25 January 2012	42	Diabetes
Ludwig Schuzle	Pangu Pati	East Sepik (Angoram)	8 March 2013		
Daniel Mona	PNC	Central (Goilala)	4 February 2015		Malaria
Steven Pirika Kama	URP	Bougainville (South Bougainville)	20 February 2016	54	
Anderson Agiru	People's United Assembly	Hela (Provincial)	28 April 2016	54	Heart attack
Aide Ganasi	PNC	Western (South Fly)	8 November 2016		Heart attack
Ezekiel Anisi	PNC	East Sepik (Ambunti-Dreikirir)	24 May 2017	28	
Thomas Pelika	MAP	Morobe (Menyamya)	30 October 2019		
Mekere Morauta	NAP	National Capital District (Moresby North-West)	19 December 2020	74	Cancer
Richard Mendani	NAP	Gulf (Kerema)	20 March 2021	53	COVID-19
Roy Biyama	PNC	Western (Middle Fly)	11 September 2021	54	Kidney failure
Jonny Alonk	URP	Madang (Middle Ramu)	29 November 2021		
Sam Akoitai	URP	Bougainville (Central Bougainville)	17 December 2021	60	
William Samb	Pangu Pati	Central (Goilala)	3 March 2022		High blood pressure
Sam Basil	MAP	Morobe (Bulolo)	11 May 2022	52	Road accident
Chris Nangoi	MAP	Madang (Sumkar)	9 June 2022		
William Nakin	NAP	Bougainville (North Bougainville)	12 July 2022		Stroke
Kevin Isifu	URP	East Sepik (Wewak)	14 September 2022		Cancer
Gabriel Kapris	PNC	East Sepik (Maprik)	13 August 2023		Heart attack
Steven Pim	PNC	Western Highlands (Dei)	24 September 2023		Heart attack
Maso Karipe	Pangu Pati	Enga (Porgera-Paiela)	7 November 2023		Stomach cancer
Jimmy Uguro	Pangu Pati	Madang (Usino-Bundi)	6 February 2024		
Simon Dumarinu	SDP	Bougainville (Central Bougainville)	9 August 2024		
Sir Julius Chan	People's Progress Party	New Ireland (Provincial)	30 January 2025	85	
Luther Wenge	Pangu Pati	Morobe (Provincial)	13 September 2025		
Solan Mirisim	Pangu Pati	West Sepik (Telefomin)	1 December 2025	51	
Ekime Mek Gorosahu	United Resource Party	Eastern Highlands (Daulo)	30 September 2026		
Libert Kapris	People's First Party	East Sepik (Maprik)	17 October 2026		
