= List of ambassadors of Papua New Guinea to China =

Coordinates: 39.945542°N 116.451219°E

Ambassador of Papua New Guinea to China
- Incumbent; Don Sawong since August 2020
- Inaugural holder: Joseph Kaal Nombri
- Formation: April 1, 1984

The Papua New Guinean ambassador in Beijing is the official representative of the government in Port Moresby to the Government of the People's Republic of China.

== List of representatives ==
| Diplomatic agrément/Diplomatic accreditation | ambassador | Observations | Prime Minister of Papua New Guinea | Premier of the People's Republic of China | Term end |
|---|---|---|---|---|---|
| July 1, 1949 | | Papua and New Guinea Act 1949 Independence from Australia | | Zhou Enlai | |
| September 16, 1975 | | Declared and recognised Independence from Australia | Michael Somare | Zhou Enlai | |
| October 12, 1976 | | The government in Beijing and Port Moresby established diplomatic relations | Michael Somare | Hua Guofeng | |
| April 1, 1984 | Joseph Kaal Nombri | | Michael Somare | Zhao Ziyang | |
| March 17, 1988 | Noel Levi | | Rabbie Namaliu | Li Peng | |
| June 7, 1994 | Maimu Raka-Nou | | Julius Chan | Li Peng | |
| September 10, 1997 | Barney Rongap | | John Giheno | Li Peng | |
| August 4, 2003 | Max Rai | | Michael Somare | Wen Jiabao | |
| August 29, 2007 | John Momis | | Michael Somare | Wen Jiabao | |
| March 15, 2011 | Christopher Mero | | Peter O'Neill | Wen Jiabao | |

- China–Papua New Guinea relations
