= ANK =

ANK may refer to:

- Air Nippon, ICAO airport code
- Etimesgut Air Base, IATA airport code
- Armée Nationale Khmère (Khmer National Army)
- ANK '64, an Estonian artist collective

Ank may refer to:

- Ank Bijleveld, Dutch politician
- Ank Scanlan, American football coach
- Posu Ank (d. 1982), Papua New Guinean politician
- Karuka, a species of tree known as ank in Angal language
- Ank Parako, a character from the 2024 video game Star Wars Outlaws

== See also ==
- Ankh, an Egyptian hieroglyphic
