= Koriam Urekit =

Papua New Guinean cult leader and politician (1916–1978)

Member of the National Parliament
- In office 1972–1978
- Succeeded by: Alois Kokiv
- Constituency: Pomio Open
- In office 1968–1972
- Constituency: Kandrian-Pomio Open
- In office 1964–1968
- Constituency: East New Britain Open

Personal details
- Born: c. 1916; Ablingi, New Guinea
- Died: 3 December 1978; Port Moresby, Papua New Guinea

Koriam Michael Urekit (c. 1916 – 3 December 1978) was a Papua New Guinean cargo cult leader and politician. He served as a member of the House of Assembly and National Parliament from 1964 until his death.

== Biography ==
Urekit was born in Ablingi village in New Britain. A subsistence farmer, he helped establish and improve educational facilities in the Kandrian area. He married and had five children. He was involved in a local cargo cult, and was jailed for his activities.

In 1962 Urekit was elected to New Britain District Advisory Council, also becoming an observer at the Legislative Council. In the first elections to the new House of Assembly in 1964, he was elected from the East New Britain Open constituency. After his election he established Pomio Kivung, another cargo cult. He was re-elected from the new Kandrian-Pomio Open constituency in 1968 and from the Pomio Open constituency in 1972 and 1977. When Papua New Guinea became independent in 1975, the House of Assembly was renamed the National Parliament. During his time in parliament he continued to push for the establishment of new educational facilities, with former MP Harry Humphreys claiming he once saw Urekit try to give K20,000 to the government to set up a primary school.

Urekit collapsed while at Port Moresby Hospital on 2 December 1978 and died the following day.

== See also ==
- List of members of the Papua New Guinean Parliament who died in office
