= Lavu (surname) =

Lavu (Telugu: లావు) is a Telugu surname. It also appears in Papua New Guinea. Notable people with the surname include:

- Evelyn Lavu (died 2021), Papua New Guinea pathologist
- Lavu Nageswara Rao (born 1957), Indian judge
- Lavu Narendranath, Indian orthopedic surgeon
- Lavu Sri Krishna Devarayalu (born 1983), Indian politician
