= Pita Lus =

Papua New Guinea politician (1935–2021)

Sir Pita Lus KBE

Member of the National Parliament of Papua New Guinea
- In office 1975–2002

Member of the House of Assembly of Papua and New Guinea
- In office 1964–1975

Personal details
- Born: 16 September 1935 Maprik District, East Sepik Province, Territory of New Guinea (now Papua New Guinea)
- Died: 1 October 2021 (Aged 86)

Sir Pita Lus KBE (16 September 1935 – 1 October 2021) was an outspoken Papua New Guinean politician who played an important role in the country's independence in 1975 and is credited with having persuaded Michael Somare, the country's first prime minister, to run for parliament.

== Early life ==
Pita Lus was born on 16 September 1935 in Lehinga (or Lahinga) village in the Maprik District of what is now the East Sepik Province of Papua New Guinea (PNG). He did not learn to read and write until he was 24. His father died in prison in Rabaul after being convicted of the murder of a white labour recruiter who was trying to take away Lus's brother. In 1949, he left home and went to Rabaul and, later, Kavieng in search of work on plantations, as a cook and a labourer. After a brief return to Maprik, he went to Manus Island in 1952, where he found a job as a labourer working for the Royal Australian Navy. He became a spokesman for the labourers in a strike against the long working hours. After seven years on Manus, Lus returned to Maprik in 1959, approached a missionary with the South Seas Evangelical Church for help to learn to read and write and attended a Bible college. Subsequently, he was recruited as a missionary to work in the Maprik District. He became well known in the area, which served him well when he decided to become a candidate in the national elections.

== Political life ==
Lus was a successful candidate in the first democratic election in the Territory of Papua and New Guinea in 1964 for the new House of Assembly under the Australian colonial government, winning the seat of Dreikikier. He was re-elected in 1968, having transferred to the Maprik constituency, which he would represent until 2002. In the House of Assembly, Lus was regarded as an outspoken critic of the colonial government. During his first two years as a member, he voted against the administration in 22 of the 30 votes held. He was an early advocate of self-government and was known for his humour and, occasionally, violence in parliament.

Together with Michael Somare, Albert Maori Kiki, Barry Holloway, Cecil Abel, Joseph Nombri and others, Lus was a founding member of the Pangu Party in 1967, opening a branch in Maprik. He considered that Somare, also from East Sepik, was the best person to lead PNG to independence. Lacking the charisma of Lus, Somare had doubts that he could be elected but Lus convinced him to stand in the Wewak constituency for the 1968 House of Assembly election and spent much of his time campaigning for Somare. Papua New Guinea became a self-governing territory on 1 December 1973, at which time Somare appointed Lus as the Minister of State for Police. He held several other ministerial appointments after that. Lus always claimed responsibility for the date of full independence. When together with Somare and several others who were discussing the best date for independence in 1975, Lus announced that 16 September was a good date, to which the others agreed. It was his birthday.

In later life, Lus campaigned for redress from the Japanese government for damage caused to Papua New Guinea during World War II.

== Honours and awards ==
- Lus was made a Knight Commander of the Most Excellent Order of the British Empire (KBE) in 1979.
- After his death it was announced that the Maprik district hospital would be renamed as the Sir Pita Lus Memorial Hospital and that a foundation had been started in his name to provide education for students in the Maprik District.

== Death ==
Lus died at home on 1 October 2021. His casket was first transferred to PNG's capital, Port Moresby, for a Lying in State at the parliament, before being returned for a funeral service in Maprik. He was buried in his home village.
