= Sogeri National High School =

Location
- Kokoda Track; Sogeri, Central Province; Papua New Guinea; 9.4177°S 147.425°E

Information
- Religious affiliation: None
- Established: 1944
- Gender: Coeducational 11th and 12th grades
- Enrolment: 700

Sogeri National High School is a school situated in Sogeri in the Central Province of Papua New Guinea (PNG). It was the country's first national high school and it educates students from all over the country in Forms 5 and 6 (Grades 11 and 12), prior to their going on to tertiary education. Many of PNG's leading politicians, administrators, business people and academics have been educated at the school. It was described by the country's first prime minister, Sir Michael Somare, himself a former pupil, as "the school that shaped the nation".

== History ==
Sogeri is situated on the Sogeri Plateau in the foothills of the Owen Stanley Range. It is approximately 40 km east of PNG's capital Port Moresby. To its northeast is Owers' Corner, which marks the end of the Kokoda Track, a walking trail that connects Kokoda in Oro Province to Sogeri. During World War II, Australian and other soldiers successfully defended the track against an attempted invasion of Port Moresby by the Japanese army.

The school was started in 1944 with an emphasis on teacher training, as part of the Australian government's Commonwealth Reconstruction Training Scheme for former service personnel. It was known as the Papuan Central Training School until 1947, when it was renamed as the Sogeri Education Centre. In 1958 it became the Sogeri Secondary School, changing its name in 1964 to be the Sogeri High School. In 1966 it merged with Iarowari High School, also in Sogeri, and at the end of 1969 it became a national high school, limiting its input to Forms 5 and 6, with younger children going to Iarowari. 1969 was also the first year in which girls were admitted. In 1975 the school became Sogeri National High School, remaining under that name until 2011 when it became the Sogeri National School of Excellence, although it continues to be referred to as a national high school.

== Independence celebrations ==
Papua New Guinea achieved independence on 16 September 1975 and the school played a leading role in the celebrations. On 14 September foreign dignitaries, including over 30 Heads of State, arrived at Jacksons International Airport to be met by the whole school in colourful costumes, representing the different provinces of the new country. On Independence Day the entire school formed a guard of honour for the new flag of Papua New Guinea as it was carried to the Flag Raising Ceremony on Independence Hill in Waigani, the government district of Port Moresby. In the afternoon, students escorted visiting dignitaries during ceremonies at the Sir Hubert Murray Stadium. The following day, at the same stadium, the students performed an historical tableau, depicting the history of PNG from pre-colonial times to independence. Finally, the students and staff were at the airport to farewell the visitors. For their contribution, Somare awarded the students a one-week holiday.

== Courses offered ==
The school, which has over 700 students, now offers courses in the following subjects: language and literature; mathematics; biology; chemistry; physics; geology; applied science; economics; accounting; business studies; history; geography; legal studies; information technology; and home economics. Its facilities were significantly upgraded in 2014, at the time of its 70th anniversary, to provide a new administration block, school library, science blocks, two double storey dormitories for male and female students, a museum, an auditorium and teachers' houses.

== Former students ==
Those that have studied at the school since its founding in 1944 include:

- Michael Somare, former prime minister of PNG
- Mekere Morauta, former prime minister of PNG
- Joseph Nombri, PNG ambassador to Japan, South Korea and China
- Ebia Olewale, former deputy prime minister
- Auvita Rapilla, PNG Olympic Committee secretary-general
- Paulias Matane, former governor-general
- Patrick Pruaitch, longstanding member of parliament and leader of the opposition
- Davis Steven, former deputy prime minister
- Evelyn Lavu, former director of PNG's Central Public Health Laboratory
- Margaret Aka, only the third woman in the world to coach a male Association football team
- Oala Oala-Rarua, former PNG high commissioner to Australia
- Florence Bundu, former chairperson of the PNG Olympic Committee, sportswoman and HIV/AIDS activist
- Noel Towaliya Yaubihi, the first master in medicine UPNG in anaesthesia and former president of the National Doctors Association PNG.
