= Ron Neville =

Member of the National Parliament
- In office 1968–1977
- Succeeded by: Wiwa Korowi
- Constituency: Southern Highlands Provincial
- In office 1964–1968
- Constituency: West Papua Special

Personal details
- Born: 2 December 1929; Moree, Australia
- Died: 31 May 1986 (aged 56); Papua New Guinea

Ronald Thomas Dalton Neville MBE (2 December 1929 – 31 May 1986) was an Australia-born Papua New Guinean politician and businessman. He served as a member of the House of Assembly and National Parliament from 1964 to 1977.

== Biography ==
Neville was born in December 1929 in Moree, New South Wales and was educated at De La Salle College in Armidale and Saint Ignatius' College in Sydney. After leaving school in 1947, he earned a diploma from the Australian School of Pacific Administration. He then joined the Department of Native Affairs in the Territory of Papua and New Guinea as a cadet patrol officer in 1948. He served in Milne Bay, Morobe, Sepik and Southern Highlands, rising to become a Senior Assistant District Officer. He also married Colleen Wren and had six children.

In 1963 Neville resigned from the civil service to contest the first elections to the House of Assembly in February–March 1964. He was elected from the West Papua Special constituency, defeating incumbent MLC Ron Slaughter. During his first term in parliament he served as vice chairman of the Public Accounts and Public Works committees. He was re-elected unopposed in the 1968 elections from the Southern Highlands Regional constituency, and served on the District Advisory committee. He was re-elected again in 1972 from the renamed Southern Highlands Provincial constituency, and was awarded an MBE in the 1974 Birthday Honours. Following independence in 1975, the House of Assembly was renamed the National Parliament.

He retired from politics prior to the 1977 elections to concentrate on his business. He died in May 1986 when a truck he was driving hit a bus on the road between Mendi and Mount Hagen. His son Tim later also became an MP.
