= Ten Thousand Years in a Lifetime =

Autobiography of Albert Maori Kiki, the Papua New Guinea pathologist and politician

- Author: Albert Maori Kiki
- Genre: Autobiography
- Publication date: 1968

Kiki: Ten Thousand Years in a Lifetime is the autobiography of Albert Maori Kiki, a Papua New Guinea pathologist and politician.

The book, first published in 1968, describes the author's childhood as a member of a semi-nomadic tribe, with vivid descriptions of rituals and customs. It recounts his first contact with western civilisation, his further education, and his political awakening.

According to the preface, the book was dictated onto a tape recorder, and was later transcribed and edited by Ulli Beier.

The book was reviewed by L. L. Langness in American Anthropologist (Volume 72, Issue 6), where he describes it as "an account well worth reading whether you specialise in New Guinea, the Pacific, or in some other area of the world."

== Contents ==
Preface

1. Growing up in Papua
2. Orokolo
3. Initiation
4. Entering the White Man's World
5. Fiji
6. island Papua new Guinea
7. Fighting Years
8. The Buka Affair
9. Growing Tensions
10. Pangu Pati
11. Elections
