= Turi Wari =

Papua New Guinean politician

Member of the National Parliament
- In office 1972–1977
- Succeeded by: Pundia Kange
- Constituency: Ialibu-Pangia Open
- In office 1968–1972
- Preceded by: Koitaga Mano
- Constituency: Ialibu Open

Personal details
- Born: c. 1933; Ialibu, Papua
- Died: 24 April 1987

Turi Wari (c. 1933 – 24 April 1987) was a Papua New Guinean politician. He served as a member of the House of Assembly and National Parliament from 1968 until 1977.

== Biography ==
Wari was born around 1933 in Ialibu in the Territory of Papua, and was one of the first people in the area to come into contact with Europeans. As a result, between 1955 and 1968 he worked as an interpreter for the Department of Native Affairs. He married and had seven children.

He contested the Ialibu seat in the 1964 general elections, finishing second to Koitaga Mano, although around 7,000 votes behind. In the 1968 elections Mano transferred to the Kendep-Tambul seat and Wari was elected from the Ialibu constituency. He was re-elected from the renamed Ialibu-Pangia constituency in 1972 elections. However, he was heavily defeated in the 1977 elections, receiving just 150 of the 14,000 votes cast in the constituency.

He died of cancer in April 1987, survived by two wives and several children.
