= Posu Ank =

Member of the National Parliament
- In office 1977–1982
- Preceded by: Momei Pangial
- Succeeded by: William Ank
- Constituency: Mendi Open

Personal details
- Died: April 1982 (aged 35)
- Political party: People's Progress Party

Posu Ank (died April 1982) was a Papua New Guinean politician. He served as a member of the National Parliament between 1977 and 1982.

== Biography ==
A pastor in the United Church, Ank contested the Mendi Open constituency in the 1972 elections, but finished as runner-up to Momei Pangial. He served as chairman of the Southern Highlands Area Authority.

He defeated Pangial in the 1977 elections and was elected to the National Parliament. A member of the People's Progress Party, following the elections, he was appointed Secretary to the Minister for Health as the PPP joined the coalition government. When PPP leader Julius Chan took over as prime minister, Ank became government whip.

He died in a car accident in 1982, shortly before nominations closed for the general elections that year. His brother William stood as the PPP candidate in his place and was elected. A primary school in Mendi was named after him.
