= Matthias Toliman =

Paupa New Guinean Politician

Member of the House of Assembly
- In office 1964–1973
- Succeeded by: Martin Tovadek
- Constituency: Rabaul (1964–1968); Gazelle (1968–1973)

Leader of the Opposition
- In office 1972–1973
- Preceded by: Michael Somare
- Succeeded by: Tei Abal

Ministerial Member for Education
- In office 1968–1972
- Succeeded by: Ebia Olewale

Member of the Administrator's Council
- In office 1964–1972

Undersecretary for Education and Local Government
- In office 1966–1968

Undersecretary for the Administrator's Department
- In office 1964–1966

Personal details
- Born: 25 August 1925 Bitakapuk, New Guinea
- Died: 6 September 1973 (aged 48) Port Moresby, Papua and New Guinea

Matthias Tutanava Toliman CBE (25 August 1925 – 6 September 1973) was a Papua New Guinean politician. He served as a member of the House of Assembly between 1964 and 1973, also holding ministerial roles from 1964 until 1972.

== Biography ==
Born in Bitakapuk, a hamlet near Paparatava in 1925 to To Liman and Ia Kabu. His father and grandfather were both traditional leaders of the Tolai people, and he became the third generation of his family to hold the role. After starting his education in a village school, he became a boarder at St John's De La Salle School in Kinagunan. After finishing school, he joined St Mary's Seminary at Vunapope in order to become a priest.

During World War II Toliman was detailed by Japanese forces. Following the war, he decided against returning to the seminary and decided to become a teacher instead. He resumed his education and qualified as a teacher in 1957. He taught at a Catholic mission for seven years, becoming headteacher in 1959 and also served as president of the Catholic Teachers' Association of New Britain and New Ireland. His four brothers and wife were also teachers. He was also a father of seven.

In 1964 he contested the first general elections under universal suffrage, and was elected to the House of Assembly from the Rabaul constituency. Following the elections, he was appointed to the Administrator's Council and made Undersecretary for the Administrator's Department. He also became Deputy Leader of Elected Members. In 1966 he changed undersecretary roles, becoming Undersecretary for Education and Local Government.

Toliman was re-elected in the 1968 elections in the Gazelle Open constituency. He continued as a member of the Administrator's Council, and was made ministerial member for Education. In this role he established the National Teaching Service. In the 1971 Birthday Honours he was awarded a CBE.

A founder of the conservative United Party, Toliman was re-elected again in the 1972 elections. Although the United Party was the largest faction in the House, the Pangu Party was able to form a coalition government. Toliman was the United Party's candidate for the Speakership, but was defeated 49–48 by Perry Kwan. He subsequently became Leader of the Opposition, with the Pangu Party's Michael Somare as Chief Minister.

On 6 September 1973 Toliman was taken ill while in the House of Assembly, and was taken to hospital, where he died of a heart attack. Hie funeral in Rabaul was attended by over 10,000 people. He was buried in Bitakapuk.

== See also ==
- List of members of the Papua New Guinean Parliament who died in office
