= Buaki Singeri =

Member of the National Parliament
- In office 1972–1977
- Preceded by: Rauke Gam
- Succeeded by: Tani Kungo
- Constituency: Kabwum Open

Personal details
- Born: 1937 Indagen, New Guinea
- Died: June 1987 (aged 49–50)

Buaki Singeri (1937 – June 1987) was a Papua New Guinean politician. He served as a member of the House of Assembly and National Parliament from 1972 until 1977.

== Biography ==
Singeri was born in 1937 in the village of Indagen in the Territory of New Guinea. He attended a mission school between 1948 and 1955 and spent 1956 in an Administration School. Between 1957 and 1961 he trained as a Medical Assistant at the Papua Medical College in Port Moresby. He subsequently worked as a clerk in the Department of District Administration in Kabwum from 1962 to 1967 and owned a coffee plantation. He married and had five children.

Singeri contested the Kabwum seat in the 1968 general elections, finishing second to eventual winner Rauke Gam in first preference votes. However, he defeated Gam in the 1972 elections and was elected to the House of Assembly, which was renamed the National Parliament at independence in 1975. In the 1977 elections he finished third in the first-preference vote tally and was unseated by Tani Kungo. He contested the Lae constituency in the 1982 elections, but finished eighth out of nine candidates.

He died in June 1987 following a long illness.
