= Evelyn Lavu =

Papua New Guinea clinical pathologist (died 2021)

- Born: Lalaura, Central Province, Papua New Guinea
- Died: August 2021
- Occupation: Clinical pathologist
- Children: Two

Evelyn Lavu (died August 2021) was the most senior pathologist in Papua New Guinea (PNG) and a recognised leader in the fight against HIV, malaria and drug-resistant tuberculosis. She was Director of the Central Public Health Laboratory in Papua New Guinea for over a decade and, in June 2021, became PNG's first and only female Professor of Medicine.

== Early life ==
Lavu was born in the village of Lalaura in PNG's Central Province. Her father was a pastor who also ran the village cooperative store, where she was often called upon to help out. She went to school at Sogeri National High School. She graduated from the University of Papua New Guinea in 1986 and then did postgraduate studies in haematology at the Royal Prince Alfred Hospital in Sydney, Australia, becoming a Fellow of the Royal College of Pathologists of Australasia (FRCPA) in 1996.

== Career ==
Lavu was employed as a clinician, researcher and laboratory scientist in PNG's capital, Port Moresby, but her activities had an influence throughout the country. She became Director of the country's Central Public Health Laboratory of the National Department of Health of Papua New Guinea. Her work included early diagnosis of HIV in infants and HIV viral load testing, which is considered to have had an important impact on PNG's HIV response, permitting children with HIV to grow up as productive members of society. She also researched malaria and Human papillomavirus infection (HPV), promoting Pap tests at the village level. Lavu also worked on vaccine-preventable diseases, such as measles and rubella. Later in her career she studied for a PhD in genome sequencing, to enable her to contribute to PNG's work related to the transmission pathways of drug-resistant tuberculosis. Prior to her death she also played a leading role in the country's response to COVID-19.

Lavu was Chair of the PNG Medical and Scientific Advisory Committee and, shortly before her death, she became the first female Professor of Medicine at the University of Papua New Guinea and a Member of the PNG Institute of Medical Research (PNGIMR) Governing Council.

== Awards and honours ==
- Lavu was one of the recipients of a Westpac Outstanding Women Award (WOW) in 2015.

== Death ==
Evelyn Lavu died in August 2021. She had two children. In paying tribute, Papua New Guinea's Prime Minister, James Marape, described her as an "outstanding daughter of the nation".
