= Barry Holloway =

Papua New Guinean politician (1934–2013)

Sir Barry Holloway KBE

4th Speaker of the House of Assembly of Papua New Guinea
- In office 23 June 1972 – 16 September 1975
- Preceded by: Perry Kwan

1st Speaker of the National Parliament of Papua New Guinea
- In office 16 September 1975 – 9 August 1977
- Succeeded by: Kingsford Dibela

Personal details
- Born: 26 September 1934 Kimberley, Australia
- Died: 16 January 2013 (aged 78) Brisbane, Australia
- Cause of death: Prostate cancer
- Resting place: Kimberley
- Party: Pangu Pati
- Parent(s): Arch Holloway; Betty Holloway (née Blyth)
- Relatives: Ernest Blyth (grandfather)
- Occupation: Politician

Sir Barry Blyth Holloway, KBE (26 September 1934 – 16 January 2013) was an Australian-born Papua New Guinean politician.

== Early life ==
Barry—a sixth generation Tasmanian—was born in Kimberley, Tasmania on 26 September 1934, to Arch and Betty (née Blyth) Holloway, in the homestead "Armitstead", the same house where his mother was born. He was educated in Kimberley, Launceston Church Grammar School and Hobart High School.

== Kiap ==
In 1953, he went to Papua New Guinea as a 'Kiap' (Patrol Officer), fell in love with the place, has made PNG his home ever since, and even relinquished his Australian citizenship to become a PNG citizen in 1975 when PNG gained independence from Australia (PNG does not allow dual citizenship). He spent most of his life in Port Moresby and in the Eastern Highlands (Kainantu and Goroka).

His first posting, or one of his early postings was over in Bougainville, where he experienced some of the sort of the challenges and the rigours of being a Kiap, being combination of policeman, judge, jury, social worker and development official.

In a recent interview with ABC, the late Sir Barry said: "We started a six-week orientation course. We were given basic multi-functional activities to do, such as learning how to map, how to handle government stores and all sorts of clerical work which really dampened our spirits somewhat, because we were coming up for high adventure", he said. After two years with a senior patrol officer on the island of Bougainville, he was sent off on his own to man a remote outpost in Madang Province.

In 1960, Sir Barry worked as a Patrol Officer with Graham Pople as well as the District Officer at Kainantu. There was one Land Rover allocated to all officers and often the District Officer would use the vehicle. Mr. Pople states;

"Barry overcame this problem in his own way. He went out and bought a Volkswagen (Beetle) and this was used by us a heck of a lot. Our work was a lot more efficient because of the availability of Barry's vehicle. "Management" was all aware how vital to our successful work that this vehicle was".

== Politician ==
In 1968, Papua New Guinea having begun a transition towards self-government, he was (along with Albert Maori Kiki, Michael Somare and Tony Voutas) a founding member the Pangu Pati, "the first real political party in Papua New Guinea", which went on to become one of the country's main political parties. In the 1968 general election, he was elected to the House of Assembly as MP for Kainantu.

Following the 1972 general election, he was elected as the first Speaker of the House. Papua New Guinea became fully independent from Australia in 1975, at which time he assumed Papua New Guinea citizenship and surrendered his Australian passport. He became the first Speaker of the National Parliament, until the 1977 general election, in which he retained his seat in Parliament but was appointed Minister of Finance by Prime Minister Michael Somare. He retained the position in Cabinet under Prime Minister Julius Chan from 1980 to 1982. In 1985, he was one of several MPs to leave the Pangu Pati.

He was still active in politics shortly before his death, standing unsuccessfully for the position of Governor of the Eastern Highlands Province in the 2012 general election, losing to Julie Soso. He died of prostate cancer in hospital in Brisbane on 16 January 2013. In accordance with his wishes, he was buried next to his parents at his birthplace, Kimberley, Tasmania; the burial took place on Australia Day, 26 January 2013.

== Komuniti Kaunsil Bisnis ==
Barry assisted establish the Farmers' and Settlers' Co-operative and promoted communal ownership of business with government involvement resulting in people from Kainantu and Obura-Wonenara contributing to 'Komuniti Kaunsil Bisnis' and acquired various plantations. Under Sir Barry, the cooperative acquired more than 40% of a competing company that was opposed to the cooperative ideology (Farmset). The cooperative became a dominant force in Kainantu.

Komuniti Kaunsil Bisnis, Kainantu owns Farmset Limited and has 200 employees, 10 branches, headquarters in Goroka and a distribution network that spreads beyond PNG to other markets in the south-west Pacific.

== Personal life ==
Barry's love affair with PNG was both physical and spiritual. Nine of his 12 children were born to Papua New Guinean mothers. Friends say the unofficial count is 16.

His first wife, with whom he had three children, was Australian; his other wives were Papua New Guinean.

His first wife Elizabeth, whom he met and married in Tasmania while on leave from PNG, moved back to Australia to raise their twin sons and daughter.

Holloway married Ikini Yaboyang, a feisty young journalist, in 1974. He is survived by his last wife, Dr Fua Uyassi (Lady Holloway). Lady Fua Holloway had six children to Sir Barry and named them all starting with the letter ‘B’ - like Barry's name (Betty Holloway, Bonnie, Belinda, Bronwyn, Benjamin and Baju).

Says Daniel: ''He cared very much for all his children … and despite his marriages unfortunately not working out, he also cared for his wives to the end.''

He is loved and missed by his children.

His large and unconventional family was just one of the ways in which his life matched that of many traditional ''big men'' in PNG society. His homes in Port Moresby and Kainantu were open houses to friends and colleagues, his vehicles were freely available and what money he had was shared with those in need. ''If he only had a dollar in his pocket and someone asked him for some money he would give it to them", Daniel says.

Unlike many Australians who stayed after independence—and many more of the Papua New Guineans who succeeded them in positions of power—Holloway did not set out to enrich himself. He was appalled by those who did and, ultimately, it probably hastened his death on 16 January 2013, aged 78, in Brisbane.

== Awards ==
Holloway was made a Commander of the Order of the British Empire (CBE) in the 1975 Birthday Honours. He was made a Knight Commander of the Order of the British Empire (KBE) in the 1984 New Year Honours.

National Parliament of Papua New Guinea
Preceded by Perry Kwan	Speaker of the House of Assembly of Papua and New Guinea; 1972–1975	House of Assembly became National Parliament at independence
New title	Speaker of the National Parliament of Papua New Guinea; 1975–1977	Succeeded by Kingsford Dibela
