= Iambakey Okuk =

Independence leader in Papua New Guinea

Iambakey Okuk, CBE

Deputy Prime Minister
- In office 1980–1982
- Preceded by: Ebia Olewale
- Succeeded by: Paias Wingti

Minister for Primary Industries
- In office 1985–1986

Leader of the Opposition
- In office 1983–1984
- Preceded by: Ted Diro
- Succeeded by: Stephen Tago

Minister for Transport
- In office 1980–1982

Leader of the Opposition
- In office 1978–1980
- Preceded by: Tei Abal
- Succeeded by: Michael Somare

Minister for Education
- In office 1975–1976

Minister for Transport
- In office 1974–1975

Minister for Agriculture
- In office 1972–1974

Member of the National Parliament
- In office 1983–1986
- Preceded by: Malo Kiniyafa
- Succeeded by: Benias Sabumei
- Constituency: Unggai-Benna District Open
- In office 1972–1982
- Preceded by: John Nilles
- Succeeded by: John Nilkare
- Constituency: Chimbu Province

Personal details
- Born: 5 May 1945 Territory of New Guinea (now Papua New Guinea)
- Died: 14 November 1986 (aged 41) Papua New Guinea

Iambakey Palma Okuk CBE (5 May 1945 – 14 November 1986) was an independence leader in Papua New Guinea and served as Deputy Prime Minister, the nation's first Minister for Agriculture and Fisheries, and repeatedly in the capacity of Minister of Transport, Minister of Primary Industries and Leader of the Opposition. He is known as Papua New Guinea's "most colourful and controversial politician". Okuk first led protests against unfair labor practices, and then once elected to office, worked to reserve sectors of the economy for citizens as a method of returning a complex economic role to Papua New Guineans. In the post-independence decade, Okuk built a coalition of minority political factions which forced a successful change of government, in which he became Deputy Prime Minister.

== Early life, education, and labour protest ==
Okuk was born in Simbu Province in the Central Highlands of the Territory of New Guinea in 1945. He spent eighteen years in the area around Hagen, learned the local language and went to school. His firsthand experience of racism began with the deference and privilege demanded by Europeans. The ideals that he had learned were not realized, and his achievements could not overcome the constraints of racial discrimination. Although he was being prepared for higher education in Australia, he opted to take up an apprenticeship program to become a mechanic. This program allowed him to learn a trade of great symbolic significance, the control of European technology, which could be used in the Highlands (not just urban centres) while allowing him to stay and participate in local political developments.

He rejected opportunities for education in Australia as years spent abroad would take him away from the political developments and his political constituency. His participation in sports and the Papua New Guinea Volunteer Rifles gained him respect and gave him experience in leadership which found expression in his later political activities. In sports especially, he found a ground on which to compete on an equal footing with his European counterparts, and as captain of his football team, he was recognized for his leadership by both his European as well as his Papua New Guinean peers.

=== Labour organizing and protest ===
While in Port Moresby doing his apprenticeship program with the Commonwealth Department of Works, he attended meetings of a discussion group made up mostly of students from the Administration College who called themselves the Bully Beef Club; this group later grew into the Pangu (Papua and New Guinea Union) party.

He organized a labour protest against discriminatory pay practices in 1966. As with other sectors of the public service, Australians who came to New Guinea were often not qualified for equivalent programs or positions in Australia. Duties and privileges, as well as wages, were fixed by race, regardless of qualifications.

Okuk was a grassroots organizer. He did not enter politics from the top, but first implemented administration policy through the public service and then moved to elected office. He was among a group of educated young people who came to be regarded as 'radicals', not because of any unifying ideology, but simply because they dared to criticize the administration and demand change. The young Papuans and New Guineans found they were not the only ones that were critical of the administration. For example, many Europeans in the apprenticeship program were new migrants to Australia, who also could not speak English well. They did not blend as easily with the Australians in the program and found that they also were victims of discrimination, although not as severely as the indigenous population.

Organizing the apprentices took many months of discussions and planning because they were dispersed all over the territory. Okuk's charismatic quality led to him becoming the spokesman for the Papua New Guinean apprentices in their protest. His style was in keeping with what has come to be known as the Melanesian Way. Consensus is achieved only after intensive discussion within the group, when all parties are satisfied that their position has been heard and understood, even if they maintain diverging opinions and undertake different actions.

There were limited gains, but what was especially important as what they had learned from their efforts. They were encouraged by the effect that their protest had on the pay scale beyond their department. Every small gain caused the general pay scale to be adjusted.

=== First political campaign in Wabag ===
Okuk's reputation grew due to his aggressive posture, as well as his organizational ability. By 1968 or 1969, he was participating in many types of political activism. When he was finishing his apprenticeship in Wabag, he became formally involved in politics by standing for election in 1968 there.

Because of the educational requirements for the Regional seat, the candidates were divided among older, established and extremely conservative European businessmen and a few of the newly educated indigenous candidates. The young educated indigenous candidates were not well established, having lived away from their communities while being educated. They had not yet had many business opportunities.

This campaign was subjected to intense study by Colebatch et al., who concluded that "Iambakey's campaigning affected both the course of the election and the political climate of the period." Okuk came in fourth, behind three European planters and businessmen, but he was first among the indigenous candidates. During the campaign, his clan brother, Joseph Nombri, came to Wabag to assist him. Nombri's strong identification with Pangu (which was labeled as radical) contributed to Okuk's loss.

The authors of "Free Elections in a Guided Democracy" made several observations about Okuk during the course of the campaign:

Iambakey had talked of representation at the UN and of overseas trade. An indigenous man who concerned himself with other than strictly parochial matters without cutting himself off from the uneducated populace was dangerous because he betrayed a sophistication that put him outside expatriate control. The influence of the European candidates within the community was based on their long residence and successful businesses in the area. Although known to the community when he was a child growing up in the western highlands, his business and leadership skills had not yet been proven in these communities.

Colebatch et al. (1971) were obviously impressed by his command of local as well as national issues: "Iambakey alone was aware of uneducated Highlanders' dependence upon Europeans and their susceptibility to European propaganda and he was the only indigenous candidate who had pondered the implications of the size of the electorate." His pluck and tenacity won him begrudging respect from even those he opposed. "There was no 'Yessir' in Okuk's political vocabulary: he was prepared to argue with the European candidates and stand up to cross-examination."

=== Coffee-buying business ===
After completing his apprenticeship, Okuk moved to his home province of Simbu to start a coffee buying business and he stood in the 1970 by-election for the Simbu Regional seat. Sachiko Hatanaka attributes Okuk's election loss to Father Nilles, due to his lack of campaign funding. It was significant to the outcome of the election, however, that Father Nilles had worked in the community since before Okuk was born, and that Okuk's status in the community was unproven since he was just returning after a long absence.

In 1972, two brothers-in-law, one European (Jim Collins) and one Papua New Guinean, helped Okuk break into the coffee buying business. His secondary education over-qualified him to be a mechanic but served him well in the coffee business. Again he was in direct competition with Europeans. Standish states that Okuk used his employment as an opportunity to campaign.

Once he had acquired some business capital, he expanded his business, organizing other buyers. Finally, he built the first indigenous-owned coffee factory, named Tokma after the fertile limestone mountain which had sustained his village's gardens. He bridged traditional and modern forms of political organization, participating in cooperatives as well as the traditional gift exchange. Part of the profit from the coffee business went into buying vehicles and assisting other businessmen in getting their start. In this way, helping others to establish businesses, he established himself politically in his home constituency. After developing his business, he stood against Father Nilles again and defeated him in 1972, and became the Simbu Regional Member in the Third House of Assembly.

== Early political career ==
Papua New Guinea achieved independence during Okuk's first term of office, concluding a decade of political development. Once elected to office, he sought legislative means of securing an economic role for Papua New Guineans. During the preceding ten years, coffee production had come to be dominated by Highlanders. Although the percentage of indigenous production of coffee was well ahead of that in other primary industries, the marketing and processing were all handled by expatriates. As yet, Papua New Guineans were little more than agricultural labourers.

Okuk considered his most significant contribution to the independence process getting elected to the House to assure the needed majority, and helping to persuade others, especially Highlands, parliamentarians to vote for self-government. He became the first Minister of Agriculture, where he initiated legislation nationalizing the primary industries, starting with the coffee industry, thus working to reverse the colonial dynamic. His strategy was to reserve a segment of the industry for citizens through legislation; later this strategy was also applied to vegetable marketing and public transportation. When he became Minister for Transport, he nationalized the airlines, Air Niugini, by first initiating the purchase of shares from Ansett, Trans Australia Airlines (TAA), and Qantas, and then moving to localize the management. He started programs to train citizens for the technical and skilled positions then held by expatriates; he felt the program which was the most symbolic of self-reliance and self-determination was his pilot training program. Because of his aggressive localization efforts, Okuk was shuffled three times within one term of office and finally resigned from the administration he had served under when Papua New Guinea gained its independence.

=== Chimbu regional campaign of 1972 ===
Okuk was elected to his first term of office as the Regional Member for Chimbu Province. In describing Okuk, Standish saw "A strong-faced intense man with a wry humour and shrewd charm, he shelters some bitter memories and can be quick to anger." (Standish 1976: 324) He characterized him as the most radical candidate but also the most well known since he participated in the 1970 by-election and campaigned in Chimbu for two years afterwards. For two years after losing the 1970 by-election, Okuk lived and worked in his home province of Chimbu for the first time in 18 years. It took time to re-establish himself after leaving Chimbu as a child to live in Hagen.

By the 1972 election campaign, he felt that self-government was not only inevitable but coming soon. In interviews during the campaign, Okuk likened the progress to self-government to the inescapable passage of time. "You know self-government and independence is like a clock. The hands move and the time comes around. If you force it too quickly you break the clock. If you pull self-government quickly the clock is wrong. And yet you can't stop it. Self-government is coming." (Standish 1976: 328)

Okuk's campaigning blended traditional and modern political methods. The claim to leadership of a traditional bigman is not "vested with authority" but is a matter of persuading a loyal "followership". The loyalty of the followership is won by past assistance in death and bridewealth payments, lawsuits and inter-clan exchange (Strathern 1966). Since a bigman is judged by his ability to manipulate wealth, not just accumulate it, Okuk's business acumen, and the assistance he gave others, was politically significant. Repeatedly in the literature, the hallmark of leadership, especially in the Highlands, has been described as twofold: big men "achieve their position through their powers of oratory and their ability to obtain and deploy wealth through transactions with exchange partners".

Okuk was the candidate with appeal beyond his tribal area, taking four constituencies out of seven. His nearest rival, Waru Degemba, received 57.7% of his votes from his home constituency, Chauve. As Standish has observed, "Coffee and politics are inextricably linked in the Chimbu." (1976: 314) Because of his coffee business, Okuk was perceived as opening up more opportunities for indigenous participation in the industry. Unknown to Okuk, he was perceived as having traditional claims to leadership. Only when he moved back to Chimbu did he learn that his biological father had been Palma, a leader of great repute. He had died in the late 1940s (he was approximately in his mid-forties), and Okuk had known him as a grandfather.

Okuk exemplified traditional leadership characteristics and employed traditional methods for gaining followership, but he worked beyond the geographic boundary of the traditional sphere of influence, and for goals beyond clan prestige and ceremonial exchange. He worked steadily in political activism since the first House of Assembly in 1964, standing in two by-elections in 1968 and 1970, setting up his coffee buying business and campaigning for two years afterwards in Chimbu until the 1972 elections. In the words of another analyst, "If sustained and single-minded drive meant anything, Iambakey deserved to win." (Standish 1976:326)

=== The Third House of Assembly ===
The First House of Assembly (1964), which was the earliest colonial governing body with an indigenous majority, established the Select Committee on Constitutional Development. Under-secretaries then worked with departmental heads, in training for Ministerial responsibilities, although: "It is true that the Ministerial Members were given very little formal authority until 1970, and that the Administration sometimes seemed to use them to endorse, rather than to encourage them to deliberate upon, certain policies." The Second House of Assembly's Select Committee on Constitutional Development (in June 1969) recommended, "That the development of Papua-New Guinea should be geared to preparing the country for internal self-government during the life of the next House of Assembly." (Select Committee 1971: 2)(Wolfers 1976: 1). The Australian Minister for External Territories stipulated in April 1971 that self-government hinged on the emergence of a "cohesive group of Ministers ... with a majority backing of the House".

The 1972 House of Assembly had many new members Of the 73 members who sought re-election in 1972, 39 succeeded, and only nine of them were expatriates. After winning the election for the Chimbu Regional seat in late February to early March 1972, Okuk was first given the position of Deputy Speaker and Chairman of Committees in the National Parliament in the newly formed coalition government. He resigned this position less than a week after the first sitting of the new House of Assembly when he was named as Minister of Agriculture (26 April 1972) in the Somare-led coalition government.

In his first speech before the House of Assembly Okuk paid tribute to Kondom Agaundo, the first elected representative from the Highlands. Okuk patterned himself after Agaundo in many respects, especially with regards to the political leverage of a united Highlands voting block.

The foremost issue before the new coalition government was setting an early date for self-government. Yet, even though Okuk was a government minister, he took up many positions in conflict with the coalition government's stand. The issues in which he became involved on the House floor were the Bougainville Copper Agreement, Chimbu Coffee Cooperative, Highlands Labour Scheme and land reform.

==== Bougainville copper agreement ====
The Bougainville copper agreement was negotiated by the Australian Administration prior to self-government in Papua New Guinea. The terms, usually considered to be 'generous', included tax free status for the first three years, with 20% of the company's income remaining tax-free for the entire duration of the agreement.

The government of Papua New Guinea, which has the option of purchasing 20 per cent of the equity capital, committed itself to providing Aus$42 million for infrastructural services; namely, a residential estate, transportation, educational facilities and health service. The government had to raise loans to realize its option.

Since the project initiated production in 1972, unexpected profits had left Papua New Guinea. "In 1972, after less than one year's operation, the profits of the company stood at Aus$28m. In 1973 net profits amounted to Aus$154.4m, and in 1974 Aus$114.6m. Papua New Guinea received Aus$29m from these profits, mostly as dividends."

Members from the island communities affected, Lapun, Momis, and Kaputin, repeatedly kept the issue before the Assembly. In one such motion, Father John Momis outlined guidelines for any future negotiations for mining ventures. On 23 November 1972, Okuk criticized the Bougainville project as not benefiting the bulk of the local population (arguing in support of Momis' motion), pointing out that Australia had negotiated the deal on the behalf of Papua New Guinea, and predicting that reform in favour of the landowners could avert violent confrontation later.

It is true that we will make $35 million annually; however we have made a faulty agreement, because this Government is committed to expenses, and after we take away what we have to expend and after we take away what we have to pay out then how much do we get? So the figures are not true figures at all. I do not think any white man can tell me. Mr Speaker, for the 1979-82 period when the company will be paying company tax, government dividend will be in the order of $35 million. This figure, however, overstates the Government's net financial gain; the Bougainville project has already required and will continue to require, substantial outlays of government funds to provide basic services at Arawa, such as hospitals, etc. If one deducts the estimated cost of these services, the projection of net government gain decreases to about $10 million annually in 1973-79, and perhaps $25 million annually in 1979-82. When one considers that the Bougainville mine will account for as much as 30 per cent of the gross domestic product, one can appreciate how low these revenue figures are, amounting to perhaps 10 per cent of estimated government expenditure.

Among other features of the agreement, Okuk argued for a larger Papua New Guinea stake in the project (closer to 51%), so that all the profit did not go directly into the hands of foreign capitalists, and Papua New Guinea could receive some benefit.

The total flow of capital out of the country from the Bougainville project is staggering, given the overall size of the Papua New Guinea economy. In the 1973-75 period, for example, it is estimated that capital outflow, including repatriation of profits and loan repayments, will be more than $100 million annually. Even after the bulk of loans has been paid off, by 1981-82, capital outflow will continue at an estimated rate of $30 million annually. Although no accurate estimates exist concerning the proportion of expatriates' salaries that will ultimately leave the country, one would be safe in saying that a good proportion of expatriates' high wages will ultimately leave Papua New Guinea.

==== Agriculture and land reform ====
Okuk supported another National Party member, John Kaupa, both in the debate over expatriate management of the Chimbu Coffee Cooperative and speaking out against the degradation of Highlanders in the Highlands Labour Scheme. He presented the many cases of abuse he had observed while associated with the cooperative and argued that, "Many co-operatives in Papua New Guinea are just window-dressing for white capitalists. As far as our society is concerned, you can name any white businessman in the Highlands. They run the society. Only the name represents the Chimbu people. Who benefits from the societies—the white men. Land reform was taken up by the Parliamentary Leader of National Party, Thomas Kavali, who was Minister for Lands in 1974 when four land reform bills were passed, and Okuk spoke in support of subsidized loans for citizens to buy back plantations from foreign interests prior to the introduction of this legislation.

As Minister for Agriculture, he sponsored numerous bills directed at the localization of the coffee industry. The Coffee Marketing Board, although established by the administrator in 1964, had not developed along the same lines as the Copra Marketing Board; it was dominated by expatriates and responded to the needs of plantation owners and processors rather than the small indigenous growers. His initial legislation addressed the functioning of the Coffee Marketing Board. First was the Coffee Marketing Board Stabilization Fund, which he brought as a bill on 16 June 1972. Immediately afterwards, he introduced a bill to increase the size of the Coffee Marketing Board to include more growers. In the course of 1973, he repeatedly addressed the problems plaguing the coffee industry, including abuses in buying coffee from the indigenous small growers, as well as the management of coffee cooperatives.

The indigenous share of production of coffee was well ahead of other agricultural cash crops, even copra, Papua New Guinea's first cash crop. But the coffee factories that bought the coffee from the growers and processed it was owned and operated by expatriates, and the coffee buyers for the factories were also predominately expatriates. This meant that every step beyond initial production was dominated by expatriates, who in turn set the price paid to the growers. The majority of growers, or smallholders, were individual subsistence horticulturists with small coffee gardens on the less desirable land. Growers were, therefore, little more than lowly paid agricultural laborers.

The Bill to which Okuk was most personally committed was the Coffee Dealing (Control) Bill of 1974. It reserved a segment of the coffee industry, specifically the purchasing of coffee on the roadside from the small growers, for citizens only. In the House of Assembly Debates, the issue of localization of the coffee industry was repeatedly addressed, and the final legislation, was foreshadowed repeatedly until the actual Coffee Dealing (Control) Bill was introduced and debated. Roadside coffee buying was regulated by the Coffee Marketing Board through the issuing of licenses and vehicle plates, and most village people were excluded. While his previous bills had passed easily with the support of the government, this bill had to be presented without government support, yet received an overwhelming majority vote by the members of Parliament.

At the same time, he was working on bills to apply this same strategy to other sectors, including fresh vegetable marketing and public transportation. But, before he could bring the bill to limit roadside coffee buying to citizens, he was reshuffled to Minister for Transport and had to present the bill in Parliament as a private member.

=== Minister of Transport ===
The Ministry of Transport and Civil Aviation was also a prominent and influential ministry where he could pursue localization of the airlines at the same time as he was bringing his private bills. The reshuffle came at a critical time, prior to Independence, (reported by the media on 28 February 1974) and the Highlands voting block was crucial to gaining independence since it is the most populous region of Papua New Guinea. Okuk remained Minister for Transport, and Deputy Parliamentary Leader of National Party, until after Independence, in September 1975.

The imperative which guided Okuk's work was that unless the dependency could be reversed, Papua New Guinea would be independent in name only. Dependency was perpetuated through numerous institutions and any plan for independence must address all levels. In addition to expatriate ownership of businesses, which had been the focus of his pre-independence economic nationalism, there was a direct grant-in-aid from Australia, which made up from a third to a half of Papua New Guinea's national budget in the decade following independence. For Okuk, full independence would not be realized until the Papua New Guinea national budget was supported from entirely internally generated revenues. He felt Papua New Guinea was over-burdened by a top-heavy public service and a redundant and expensive provincial government system supported by this grant, while education was neglected.

The timing for independence remained controversial. The conservative voting population of the Highlands did not want to gamble with their only recently available access to Western technology or economy. Okuk was one of the few Highlanders in the educated elite. When campaigning for the Chimbu Regional seat, he had emphasized local economic issues, but once in Parliament, he worked to persuade the other Highlands Members to vote for immediate self-government and set an early date for independence. He evaluated his role in the independence process, placing the achievement of nationhood as the first, but not the final step toward complete independence since the economy still remained dominated by foreign interests. His legislation localizing primary industries was introduced before independence and addressed the local economic conditions, as well as nationalistic aspirations.

Okuk counted as one of his highest priorities and most valued contributions to bring the infrastructure for development to remote communities, enabling smallholders to get their products to market. As Minister for Transport and Civil Aviation, he had worked with the World Bank to draw up a complete plan for roads.

He nationalized the airlines, by initiating the purchase of the shares from Ansett. He started a pilot training program to train Papua New Guineans to be pilots. But most crucially, he moved to localize the management of Air Niugini. The public service was the largest employer, and localization of those positions was a large step toward self-reliance, but he was not content with restricting the localization process to only the public sector. His critics claimed that he was moving too fast and would scare off foreign investment. Before he could localize the management of Air Niugini, he was reshuffled to a different ministry immediately after independence.

=== Resignation ===
His decision not to take the Education Ministry stemmed from the closeness of the 1977 elections. There would not be enough time as a minister to be effective in that position. Instead, he resigned to concentrate on grassroots work within his constituency.

The reshuffle was announced on 10 December 1975, two months after independence. It was widely reported that the reshuffle was done without consultation of the coalition partners. Okuk's resignation was finally made public on 20 January 1976. In 1976, he became a backbencher in Parliament, where he waited for the 1977 elections to return him to Parliament. The National Party was split, with many members remaining with the government, after Okuk had made his decision to resign.

== Opposition leader ==
In the previous period, Okuk oriented his political action towards instigating legislation, using the institutions of government, to achieve nationalistic aspirations, and returning a complex economic role to the indigenous population. In the post-independence era, he concluded that the government was not moving quickly enough to bring about economic independence. In the next period, he oriented his action toward exercising the democratic means for a change of government, questioning the representativeness of the government, testing the limit of constitutional structures.

The first major events included the re-election campaign for the 1977 election and the forming of the government. Sir John Guise stood against Michael Somare for Prime Minister. In the first two years, Okuk consolidated leadership among the Opposition, first becoming the spokesman for the Highlands United Front, and then standing against Sir Tei Abal for the Opposition leadership. In the next two years, 1978–80, Okuk lead three unsuccessful motions of no confidence against the Somare government within 20 months, leading to the final success No Confidence Motion on 11 March 1980. This generated Papua New Guinea's first change of government; Okuk became Deputy Prime Minister.

=== Becoming opposition leader ===
Even before the 1977 elections, Okuk was putting pressure on the government at every opportunity. For example, he made a motion of no confidence in four ministers with fewer educational qualifications than the ministers they had replaced in the reshuffle. After being returned to Parliament in the 1977 elections, Okuk backed Sir John Guise, who stood against Somare for the position of Prime Minister in the Second Parliament.

Most of the National Party had gone with the government, and Okuk had stayed with the Opposition, which was dominated by the United party. He had no political party. The National Party had been split and most had gone with the government, and he first had to work to create an alliance within the Opposition.

Locally based mass movements, called 'Micronationist movements' by one scholar, had been prevalent in the New Guinea islands and in Papua. The Highlands had not experienced the organized violent or passive resistance of these other regions and did not have a unifying grassroots movement. The Highlands Liberation Front (HLF) sought to achieve the same type of intertribal unification. The organization was inaugurated in 1972 by students at the University of Papua New Guinea, from the top down rather than from a popular base, and did not generate a large grassroots following. In 1977, a new offshoot, the Highlands Unified Front (HUF), was formed at the University of Papua New Guinea and was "active in the lobbying to form a new government after the 1977 national elections, with the aim of ensuring that the Highlands was adequately represented". Highland Parliamentarians were split between National Party members in government and United Party (UP) members in the Opposition. Okuk formed a corresponding parliamentary group, called the Peoples Unified Front, "in an attempt to bring together UP members and Papuans into a coherent opposition coalition".

The Leader of the Opposition was a leading conservative, Sir Tei Abal. He did not yield to Okuk's challenges because Okuk was the only member of the National Party in the Opposition. There was no constitutional mechanism for resolving a dispute in leadership, so Okuk took matters in his own hands. He chained the offices shut so that neither he nor Abal could use them until the matter was resolved, after which the matter was referred to legal experts. The finding indicated that there was nothing unconstitutional about the vote to change leadership, so by 4 May the Speaker of the Parliament directed the Parliamentary Clerk to "make necessary administrative changes which will give effect to the recognition of Mr. Okuk as the new Opposition Leader". The matter was taken up again in the next sitting of Parliament (May 1978) where another member of the United Party, with the backing of Sir Tei Abal, used the same mechanism to attempt to remove Okuk from the Opposition leadership.

The majority of the members involved were Highlanders, and this episode was creating divisiveness between the Highlands parliamentarians, for which Okuk was criticized. Support for the move had dwindled between the March and May sittings of Parliament, and in their party meeting before entering Parliament it seemed as though they could not win another vote.

The media reporting did not relate the details of what happened on 23 May 1978, which Okuk described as a confrontation in which Highlands members from both sides of government came to vote on the new Leader of the Opposition. When it came time for the votes for Okuk, the dynamics of Highlands solidarity came into play, especially for National Party Members currently part of the coalition government. Okuk remembered it as Sailas Atopare, Member for Goroka in the Eastern Highlands, who started the incident by calling to other Highlands members to join the vote, although the media did not mention him in their reporting of the incident.

Since the constitution did not describe a method for electing the Leader of the Opposition, there were no rules limiting the members who could vote. There had been accusations of interference from government members throughout this dispute, and again during the actual vote taking in Parliament. And when that alleged interference was realized on the floor of Parliament, the incident escalated. The police were finally called in when fighting broke out; one of Okuk's supporters came to blows with the alternative candidate for the Opposition Leadership, Highlanders against Highlanders. Okuk was criticized by Highland leaders for creating divisiveness after this incident especially because of the tension created between Highland members, yet the majority of the Highlanders voted for him.

The reporting in the Papua New Guinea Post-Courier on 24 May 1978 stated that "the chamber was lively before the vote". The story claimed that Clement Poiye, Nebare Kamun, and Robert Kakie Yabara were "dragged up" to the PUF benches, while Suinavi Otio had joined in on his own, and "In one exchange, Mr. Okuk and Prime Minister, Mr. Somare called each other liars." The final outcome, in any case, was Okuk was confirmed as Leader of the Opposition.

=== No-confidence motions ===
Okuk was the Leader of the Opposition for two years, from May 1978 to March 1980. During that time he attacked the government on its policies at the Indonesian border policy with Indonesia, decentralization, the foreign influence of the public service as well as the economy in general, and inadequate representation and development for the Highlands. The Papua New Guinea Post-Courier quoted him as stating "the Government was failing in its obligation to emphasize the pre-eminence of reason over force in international relations". Continuing, "Mr Okuk said the Government should show sympathy to efforts at self-determination by colonially-dominated and colonised peoples. He said he did not think the Government was giving an accurate picture of the problems in Irian Jaya."

Once he assumed Leadership of the Opposition, he set about immediately to bring down the current Somare government. He moved a total of four Motions of No Confidence in the Government within 20 months, the first only three months after he became opposition leader, on 24 August 1978 (failing with 35 ayes and 68 nays).

In mid-1979, the Somare government declared a State of Emergency in the Highlands provinces, essentially instituting martial law in those provinces, curtailing freedom of the press and freedom of assembly for innocent citizens along with those who had participated in tribal fights. Okuk stated that he would oppose this oppressive and discriminatory act with every means at his disposal. Land disputes were inevitably at the root of tribal fights, so he argued repeatedly that the only real solution lay in bringing employment and development to an area in which there was a severe land shortage, especially in Enga Province, Chimbu Province and areas of the Western Highlands.

Premdas, a university lecturer and outspoken critic, described the state of emergency as enacted "almost in desperation", and "invidious", since it "was extended only in the Highlands provinces where the bulk of the support of the opposition parties was located." A deportation order levelled against Premdas then caused a constitutional crisis, which Okuk believed to be the most important single factor in the success of the fourth, successful, non-confidence motion, since it caused Somare to lose credibility. The motion passed on 11 March 1980, and nominated Chan as alternative Prime Minister. Okuk became the Deputy Prime Minister and Minister for Transport and Civil Aviation. He nominated Chan to insure the small, but possibly pivotal, vote of the PPP faction.

Competing political analysts credit different factions of the five-party coalition that came to government with the success of the motion. Premdas and Steeves, in reviewing the events in a 1983 article claimed that "It was the vigorous opposition of Okuk and the National Party [NP] that was mainly responsible for the dismissal of the Somare government in March 1980", and continued by stating that "the NP leader projected a Prime Ministerial approach, demonstrating power and decisiveness in his declarations and actions."

== Deputy Prime Minister ==
In ousting Somare, competing political policy or ideology was not the primary issue, rather, "allegations of mismanagement, corruption, illegality and unconstitutionality, dictatorial tendencies, and political interference in the Public Service and statutory bodies" were the focus. Even though politics had driven them apart, Okuk greatly valued his personal friendship with Somare and took pains to assure that Somare was treated with respect as the first Prime Minister of Papua New Guinea.

As Deputy Prime Minister, Okuk immediately set to work investigating the management of Air Niugini. When he had been Minister of Transport and Civil Aviation previously, he had attempted to completely localize the management of Air Niugini, and this had apparently been the reason for his reshuffle in the Somare Ministry. A member of the expatriate management of Air Niugini, who Okuk referred to as "Mr. Ten Percent," left the country soon after he assumed office. He dismissed two senior national executives, as well as the expatriate general manager. "Mr Okuk's intervention was vindicated, in part, by the release in late June [1980] of the Ombudsman Commission's Interim Report on Air Niugini which analysed the financial decline of the company and suggested that, "upon the penthouse level where management lives, we discovered a den of iniquity" (Hegarty 1982: 462).

Okuk directly negotiated the purchase of the Dash-7 aircraft from the manufacturer in Canada, rather than working through brokers and agents, who were the source of the alleged "Ten Percent" commissions. With the purchase of the aircraft, air service could be provided to remote airfields, many of which were in the Highlands, which were not long enough for Air Niugini's F-27's. Many regions of Papua New Guinea are not yet connected by roads, so air service is not just a privilege of the elite, but a necessary infrastructure for development, i.e. transporting heavy payloads in and out of remote regions. Air Niugini, which had been running at a loss, was showing a profit by the time Okuk tabled the financial report in September 1981. He was a steadfast opponent of the provincial government system and the excesses created by having 600 paid politicians governing a nation of three million people.

Criticism of the decentralization process continued to be heard from academics, journalists, and national politicians. The most ardent critic was Deputy Prime Minister Okuk who seized the chance of undermining provincial governments by deciding in the cabinet (with Chan, Momis, and Kaputin absent) to allocate sectoral transport program funds, which would normally have gone from the central government to the provinces, directly to national parliamentarians.

Okuk spoke out against ethnic conflict in Morobe where Highlanders were being discriminated against. He especially spoke out against moves to repatriate Highlanders living and working in other provinces and plans to limit Highlanders ability to own land in Morobe. He argued that increased tribal fighting in the Highlands was linked to decentralization since the money spent on salaries for politicians could more effectively be spent on much needed economic development.

The Chan-Okuk government received kudos for sending military support to independent Vanuatu in 1980; Okuk claimed credit for finally setting into motion this action of the government. World market prices for coffee and copper fell during the two-year tenure of the Chan-Okuk, and the government stringency which this necessitated did not bode well for the upcoming 1982 general elections. In summarizing the performance of the government, political analyst Peter King said of Okuk, "Often he seemed to be prime minister in all but name."

While in the Opposition and while in government, Okuk consistently acknowledged, and kept newsworthy, the aspirations for self-determination of West Papuans. In the 1982 elections, he emphasized West Papua again; "he condemned neighboring Indonesia's transmigration program in Irian Jaya as a threat to border stability and Papua New Guinea's security, and proposed to confer a form of political recognition on the Operasi Papua Merdeka (OPM) --- the West Papua liberation movement".

== Disputed elections ==
In the last four years of Okuk's life, 1982 to 1986, he lost one election and won two. After losing two battles in the Court of Disputed Returns, he regained the leadership of the Opposition, and also served as Agriculture Minister again. First, a short-lived alliance with Somare was forged, during which he blocked a No-Confidence Motion in Somare, while not even in office. Finally, once back in Parliament, Okuk joined forces with Paias Wingti and Julius Chan, and supported another No Confidence Motion which removed Somare and made Paias Wingti Prime Minister.

Somare had formed the government in the aftermath of the 1982 general elections, when Chan's party, the People's Progress Party, and the National Party, under Ted Diro's leadership, were in the Opposition. Premdas optimistically applauds the democratic process in Papua New Guinea, "While most Third World countries have succumbed to electoral fraud or military coup d'état within a few years of attaining self-determination, Papua New Guinea stands apart.". The success of this process owes much to Okuk's demonstrated leadership in the handling of his defeat at the polls in the 1982 Chimbu Regional election, and the loss of most of his National Party members.

=== General Election of 1982 ===
As early as 22 January 1982, Okuk had announced his campaign strategy. Assuming his Chimbu Regional seat was secure, he would concentrate his resources and campaign efforts on the National Party Candidates nationwide. Even when warned in advance of the vote splitting tactics being used against him, over-confidence made him focus on having support once back in Parliament, i.e. on being elected Prime Minister. However, clan voting blocks and changes in local politics made him vulnerable, and he lost his seat.

People mourned his election loss in the manner in which the death of a great leader would have been mourned—by chopping off fingers and ear lobes. Okuk spurned self-mutilation as a symbol of grief, but for those who took part, this was a demonstration of respect and an acknowledgement of his leadership, even though for some such an act carried stiff penalties. During the period of upheaval following the elections, Okuk made himself visible, working to keep the damage to a minimum, and he required the same from his other National Party candidates. Most National Party candidates had lost their elections.

Okuk confirmed that there were some, who in the emotional wake of the elections, advocated military intervention. But for him, a military coup was not an alternative; he was committed to democratic institutions and he would make them work. Since both he and Thomas Kavali had lost their elections, Okuk handed the leadership of the Opposition over to Ted Diro so he would have sufficient following to become the Opposition Leader before the August meeting of Parliament when the vote would be taken for the Prime Minister. Somare then became Prime Minister again.

Many people contested the results of the 1982 election across the country. In the case of the Chimbu Regional seat, among the other allegations, the candidate who came in third place was too young to run for the seat. After considering the evidence, the court acknowledged that the candidate was proven to be underage, but declined to invalidate the election, stating that the winning candidate had not been at fault and should not be punished.

=== Elections in Unggai-Bena ===
Other National Party candidates had also brought court cases and some had won. After his court victory, Akepa Miakwe of Bena-Bena, in the Eastern Highlands, then stepped down allowing Okuk to run in a by-election in Unggai-Bena, the constituency of his wife's clan. Only ten months after his defeat in Chimbu, he was back in Parliament as the representative for the Unggai-Bena Open electorate. By August 1983 he had resumed the Leadership of the National Party and again became the Leader of the Opposition. In mid-November, a move for a No-Confidence Motion was in the works again. The move depended on United Party crossing the floor. At the last moment, the United party declined and the motion was withdrawn.

Immediately, a case was filed in the Court of Disputed Returns to invalidate the election; it was alleged that Okuk was not a resident and not qualified to stand for election in Unggai-Bena. The court case was postponed for more than a year, while Okuk again led the Opposition.

Democratic freedoms were being eroded first by the declaration of a state of emergency, which Okuk had vehemently opposed. Violations of democratic freedoms were institutionalized by the passage of the National Intelligence Organization Act, creating a national intelligence organization. Okuk fought against the proposed Peace and Good Order Bill, which would give sweeping powers to the executive to declare martial law.

He especially questioned the border treaties and cooperative operations with the Indonesian regime, the lack of recognition of the legitimate refugees from the border, whose numbers had grown to ten thousand by mid-1984, and the restriction against Australian journalists going to the border area to report on the plight of the refugees coming from West Papua.

The long-awaited United Party withdrawal from the government took place in August 1984, and Okuk put forth a motion to dissolve parliament and hold a general election. Before he could organize a No-Confidence Motion, Somare, in a surprise move, adjourned Parliament a week early while the Opposition parties were in their chambers. Another No-Confidence Motion was tabled and then withdrawn in November, and the Court of Disputed Returns removed Okuk from office in November 1984 on the grounds he did not meet the legal residency requirements at the time he ran for election in Unggai-Bena.

Since the case had been postponed for more than a year, by the time the by-election took place, Okuk had established a legal residence in the constituency and was qualified to stand in the by-election created by his own unseating. While he was out of office, the Highlands Deputy Prime Minister under Somare, Paias Wingti, defected from the government and joined with Chan to bring a No-Confidence Motion in the Somare government.

Even though he was not in office, Okuk discussed options with his party members still in office. Bringing the Motion during that very short period between the time the courts removed him from office and the subsequent by-election, i.e. during the one sitting of Parliament Okuk would miss, effectively excluded him from negotiating positions for National Party Members in the new coalition from a point of strength. Therefore, National Party declined to support Wingti and Chan and the vote was defeated.

By May sitting in 1985, Okuk was back in office. He tried to work with the Somare-led government, but when no ministerial portfolios were offered, even though he had brought a sizable party into coalition with the government, he was forced to withdraw support from the government. For the first time in ten years, he was working without the parliamentary support staff and resources afforded government ministers and opposition leaders. Okuk remained a backbencher until he joined forces with Wingti and Chan to bring a No-Confidence Motion in November 1985, a year and a half from the next general elections.

In the new government, Okuk resumed the Primary Industry portfolio (Agriculture Ministry) fourteen years after his original appointment in 1972. As Minister for Primary Industries, the issue which immediately brought him into a confrontation with Chan was the lending policy and performance of the Agriculture Bank. Okuk wanted the Bank to be transferred to the Ministry for Primary Industry because the Agriculture Bank was not living up to its mandate of supporting investment in smallholders.

== Death ==
Okuk died of liver cancer in November 1986. His body lay in state in Parliament and was then flown to major cities before being buried in Kundiawa. As with any premature death, sorcery was suspected. Riots devastated Highlands towns, including Kundiawa and Goroka, and the cities with large Highlands communities, Lae and Port Moresby, as the nation mourned the loss of their leader.

He was survived by two widows, Lady Karina Okuk and Dr. Lisabeth Ryder, and six children Tangil, Dilu, Carl, Sophia, Ruby, and Niglmoro Okuk.

Political offices
Preceded by Ebia Olewale	Deputy Prime Minister of Papua New Guinea; 1980-1982	Succeeded by Paias Wingti
