= Awali Ungunaibe =

Papua New Guinean chief and politician

Member of the House of Assembly
- In office 1972–1975
- Succeeded by: Tombol Ungunaibe
- Constituency: Poroma–Kutubu

Personal details
- Born: 1947; Kun, Papua New Guinea
- Died: 1975 (aged 28)

Awali Ungunaibe (1947 – 1975) was a Papua New Guinean chief and politician. He served as a member of the House of Assembly between 1972 and 1975.

== Biography ==
Ungunaibe was born in Kun in the Southern Highlands in 1947. Speaking both Tok Pisin and Enga, he worked as an interpreter and domestic servant between 1964 and 1971.

Ungunaibe contested the constituency in the 1972 elections. Although he was in second place after the first count, he won after preferences were distributed and was elected to the House of Assembly. He sat in the House as a member of the United Party.

He died of lung cancer in early 1975 aged 28. Following his death, claims were made that he had been killed by sorcery committed by his political rivals. His brother Tombol won the resulting by-election.

== See also ==
- List of members of the Papua New Guinean Parliament who died in office
