= Paulus Arek =

Member of the House of Assembly
- In office 1968–1973
- Succeeded by: Sergius Arek
- Constituency: Ijivitari

Minister for Information
- In office 1972–1973

Personal details
- Born: 3 December 1929 Wanigela, Papua
- Died: 22 November 1973 (aged 43) Port Moresby, Papua and New Guinea

Paulus Arek (3 December 1929 – 22 November 1973) was a Papua New Guinean politician and trade unionist. He served as a member of the House of Assembly between 1968 and 1973, and as Minister for Information from 1972 to 1973.

== Biography ==
Arek was born in Wanigela in 1929. He attended a local Anglican mission school and Sogeri Secondary School. After completing his education, he began working as a teacher at Sogeri. Around two years later, he married Ethel Breda.

After moving to Manus Island in 1954, he became headmaster of a school in Popondetta in 1956. The following year he was appointed head at a school in Iokea, before transferring to one in Daru in 1958. After a misdemeanour, he was sent to a school on the Fly River, before returning to Popondetta at a lower level a year later.

Arek contested the Popondetta constituency in the 1964 elections but was defeated by Edric Eupu. He then became head of Popondetta Primary School, as well as founding and serving as president of the Northern District Workers' Association and the Popondetta Workers' Club. He also served as vice-president of the Higituru Local Government Council, becoming its vice-president.

He ran for election again in the Ijivitari constituency in 1968, this time winning election to the House of Assembly. Sitting as an independent, during his first term as an MHA he served as chair of the Select Committee for Constitutional Development. In 1970, he became the first president of the Federation of Papua New Guinea Workers' Associations. Although he gained a reputation as a diplomatic and responsible politician, he was known to have a quick temper and an alcohol addiction.

After being re-elected in 1972 (defeating Eupu), Arek was appointed Minister of Information in the new government. After the elections he joined the People's Progress Party. As Minister of Information, he oversaw the establishment of NBC PNG.

Following a long illness with cancer, Arek died in Port Moresby General Hospital in November 1972; he was survived by his wife and eight children. He was buried in Port Moresby. His brother Sergius won the resulting by-election for the Ijivitari constituency.

== See also ==
- List of members of the Papua New Guinean Parliament who died in office
