= Ebia Olewale =

Papua New Guinean politician (1940–2009)

Sir Ebia Olewale

Deputy Prime Minister of Papua New Guinea
- In office 1977–1980
- Preceded by: Julius Chan
- Succeeded by: Iambakey Okuk

Minister of Justice of Papua New Guinea
- In office 1975–1977

Minister of Education of Papua New Guinea
- In office 1972–1973

Member of the National Parliament of Papua New Guinea
- In office 1972–1982

Member of the House of Assembly of Papua and New Guinea
- In office 1968–1972

Personal details
- Born: 21 February 1940; Western Province, Territory of Papua (now Papua New Guinea)
- Died: 23 January 2009 (aged 78)
- Children: 9

Sir Ebia Olewale (21 February 1940 – 23 January 2009) was a Papua New Guinean politician. He was elected as a member of the House of Assembly of Papua and New Guinea in 1968 and went on to hold several ministerial positions during the period of self-governance and after PNG's independence in 1975, including that of deputy prime minister. He was knighted in 1983 and served as chancellor of the University of Goroka from 2000 to 2006. From 2002 until his death, he was a director of the Papua New Guinea Sustainable Development Program.

== Early life and education ==
Niwia Ebia Olewale was born on 21 February 1940, in Ture Ture, a village not far from the administrative centre of Daru in what is now the Western Province of Papua New Guinea (then the Territory of Papua). His mother was one of the few people in the area at the time to have waged employment. He studied at a London Missionary Society school from 1949 to 1952, and then moved to a school in Daru, from 1952 to 1957. He then transferred to Sogeri National High School near Port Moresby, the country's only national-level high school at the time. In fact, he was selected to receive a scholarship to go to school in Australia, but was considered, at 17, to be too old. He was at Sogeri at the same time as many of PNG's future leaders during the independence period. An active participant in school debates, he became an effective public speaker. In 1964, he enrolled at a teachers' college in Port Moresby. A year later, he started to teach at Daru High School, transferring to Kila Kila High School in Port Moresby the following year. He resigned at the end of 1967 to seek election. In Port Moresby he was a member of the Bully Beef Club, a political discussion group that included several Sogeri students and led to the founding of the Pangu Pati, which would form PNG's first independent government in 1975.

== Political career ==
Olewale won the South Fly Open seat in the 1968 election for the House of Assembly of Papua and New Guinea. Having become a member of the Pangu Pati, he was re-elected in the 1972 election, although he did not reveal his membership of the party until after the election. He served under prime minister Michael Somare as education minister in 1972 and 1973. Following PNG's independence in 1975, Olewale was appointed as justice minister. Re-elected to what was by then the National Parliament of Papua New Guinea in the 1977 Papua New Guinean general election he became the deputy prime minister and minister for foreign affairs. To a certain extent this was by default as Albert Maori Kiki was expected to become the deputy prime minister, but he failed to be elected. Together with the secretary for foreign affairs, Anthony Siaguru, Olewale negotiated the Torres Strait Treaty with Australia and a border agreement with Indonesia.

He was not re-elected in 1982 and never returned to the parliament. The period after his election defeat was a difficult time for him. He lacked the academic qualifications to take a senior job in the civil service and his political opponents were in office. He experienced some business failures. In 1994, on the recommendation of the PNG government, the Commonwealth Secretariat chose him to be an observer at the first post-Apartheid general election in South Africa. In 1995 he became a consultant to BHP and the Ok Tedi Mine, which is situated in Western Province. In 2000, he was appointed as a director of the Papua New Guinea Sustainable Development Program Ltd, which worked mainly in Western Province, a position he held until his death. From 2000 to 2006, he was chancellor of the University of Goroka, a university that emphasises teacher training in its curriculum.

== Honours ==
Olewale was made a Knight Bachelor in the 1983 New Year Honours.

== Death ==
Olewale died on 13 January 2009, aged 78. He had two wives and nine children. His funeral took place in Port Moresby and was attended by over one thousand mourners, including the Governor-General, Sir Paulias Matane, the prime minister, Michael Somare and Veronica Somare, the deputy Prime Minister Puka Temu and the leader of the opposition, Sir Mekere Morauta. He was buried in Kunini in Western Province.
