= National Department of Health of Papua New Guinea =

Papua New Guinea (PNG)’s National Department of Health is a statutory organisation focused on the delivery of better health services for the people of Papua New Guinea.

The department’s stated key goals for the period from 2009 to 2013 are:

- Full immunisation of all children under the age of 1;
- Reduction of maternal mortality;
- Reduction of HIV/AIDS, malaria and TB prevalence;
- Improving access to service for the poor.

The current Minister for Health is Dr Lino Tom.

== Controversies ==
PNG’s National Department of Health has been accused of corruption, including taking bribes from pharmaceutical companies and misappropriation of government funds.

=== Ongoing Investigation into Corruption ===
In October 2011, Investigation Task Force Sweep Chairman Sam Koim expanded Task Force Sweep’s scope to include an investigation into corruption at the National Department of Health. His team began the process of collecting and collating information on:

- (a) Instances of misappropriation of funds and assets,
- (b) Instances of corruption in the procurement of medicines, pharmaceuticals and medical supplies, and
- (c) Activities of provincial hospitals and rural facilities.

A report on these findings is due to be provided to the National Executive Council (NEC) in the coming months. The investigation was initiated after Maxtone-Graham handed over a file to the police fraud squad which contained allegations of corrupt activities in his department.

In May 2011, Dr Clement Malau (Dr Malua), former Secretary for Health and Head of the National Department of Health until August 2011, under the previous PNG administration, was under fire for depositing a sum of PGK1.767 million from government money into the Bank of South Pacific (BSP) in 1998, instead using it for healthcare purposes and, ten years later, in August 2008, authorising the re-payment of this amount, plus interest, to an unregistered company named PACPNG Pharmaceuticals, instead of back to the government.

=== Payments from Pharmaceutical Companies ===
In March 2011, it was reported that senior officials in the National Department of Health received massive kickbacks from pharmaceutical companies for a period of up to ten years. At the time, Dr Malau said payments by medical suppliers to government officials for favours had run into “the equivalent of hundreds of thousands of dollars”.

PNG's former Health Minister Sasa Zibe also stated that the Health Department's drug supply division “is riddled with corruption and is ineffective”.

The government blamed a lack of transparency within the tender process as a reason why the corruption went unnoticed for such a long period of time. However, pharmaceutical companies that have significant contracts with the PNG government, including Borneo Pacific Pharmaceutical Ltd, remained silent when questioned by the media.

Doctors in national hospitals reported that they were “starved” of drugs in order to create an emergency system that would allow the National Department of Health to bypass the tender process and give preferential treatment to certain pharmaceutical companies.

In order to combat these allegations, Dr Malau hired a drug procurement and distribution specialist, charged with establishing an efficient drug ordering and distribution system. However, officials in the department attempted to terminate the expert’s contract prematurely.

=== AUSAID Paper ===
A paper prepared by the Australian government’s aid division, AUSAID in 2005, stated that although the country has a sound national health policy, a number of factors are hindering its implementation. These factors include:

- Management issues;
- Relationships;
- Financing arrangements;
- The skills of health practitioners; and
- External factors such as the institutional rules which affect the behaviour of sector stakeholders.
