= Leader of the Opposition (Papua New Guinea) =

Leader of the Opposition is a constitutionally sanctioned office in Papua New Guinea. It originates from Westminster role for a leader of the opposition.

The Papuan constitution defines the role "for a member of the Parliament of Papua New Guinea as being the principal speaker on behalf of those members of the Parliament who are not generally committed to support the government".

It is claimed that Michael Somare became the first official leader of the opposition in 1968.

== Leaders of the Opposition ==
Name	Took office	Left office	Notes
Michael Somare	1968	1972	
Matthias Toliman	1972	1973	
Tei Abal	1973	1978	
Iambakey Okuk	1978	1980	
Michael Somare	March 1980	April 1980	
Rabbie Namaliu	April 1980	January 1981	
Michael Somare	January 1981	August 1982	
Ted Diro	1982	1983	
Iambakey Okuk	1983	1984	
Stephen Tago	1984	1985	
Paias Wingti	April 1985	November 1985	
Michael Somare	November 1985	June 1988	
Rabbie Namaliu	June 1988	July 1988	
Paias Wingti	July 1988	1991 -?	
Rabbie Namaliu	July 1992	July 1992	
Michael Somare	August 1992	March 1993	
Jack Genia	March 1993	July 1993	
Chris Haiveta	August 1993	September 1994	
?	September 1994	August 1995	
Roy Yaki	August 1995	July 1997	
Bernard Narokobi	July 1997	July 1999	
Bill Skate	July 1999	2001	
Michael Somare	2001	2002	
Mekere Morauta	2002	2004	
Peter Yama	2004	2004	
Peter O'Neill	2004	2007	
Julius Chan	2007	August 2007	
Mekere Morauta	August 2007	2010	
Belden Namah	2010	July 2011	
Carol Kidu	February 2012	June 2012	
Belden Namah	August 2012	December 2014	
Don Polye	December 2014	May 2016	
Sam Basil	May 2016	May 2016	
Don Polye	May 2016	August 2017	
Patrick Pruaitch	August 2017	September 2019	
Belden Namah	September 2019	December 2020	
Patrick Pruaitch	December 2020	August 2022	
Joseph Lelang	August 2022	February 2024	
Douglas Tomuriesa	February 2024	Incumbent	

== See also ==
- Politics of Papua New Guinea
- Parliament of Papua New Guinea
- Prime Minister of Papua New Guinea
