= Harry Humphreys =

Member of the National Parliament
- In office 1982–1987
- Preceded by: Gabriel Bakani
- Succeeded by: Patterson Lowa
- In office 1972–1977
- Preceded by: John Maneke
- Succeeded by: Gabriel Bakani
- Constituency: Talasea Open

Personal details
- Born: Finchley, United Kingdom
- Died: 1987 Vunapope, Papua New Guinea

Henry Charles Humphreys (died 1987) was an English-born Papua New Guinean politician. He served as a member of the National Parliament in two spells between 1972 and his death.

== Biography ==
Humphreys was born in Finchley in Middlesex. After gaining an intermediate certificate at school, he served in the Territorial Army between 1937 and 1945, before becoming part of the Control Commission in Allied-occupied Germany in 1946.

In 1951 he emigrated to the Territory of Papua and New Guinea, where he took on a plantation at Volupai near Talasea in 1953. He became a member of Talasea Local Government Council and West New Britain Advisory Council, as well as serving on the Education and Land boards of West New Britain. He married and had a son.

A member of the Pangu Party, he contested the Talasea Open constituency in the 1972 elections and was elected to the House of Assembly, which was renamed the National Parliament at independence in 1975. Although he lost to Gabriel Bakani in the 1977 elections, he returned to defeat Bakani in the 1982 elections. He was re-elected in the June–July 1987 elections, but died from a heart attack at Nonga Base Hospital in Rabaul shortly afterwards. His son Peter later also served as an MP.
