= Joseph Nombri =

Papua New Guinea public servant and diplomat

Sir Joseph Nombri

Papua New Guinea ambassador to Japan, South Korea and China
- In office 1981–1992

Public Service Commissioner, Papua New Guinea
- In office 1976–1979

District commissioner, Morobe Province, Papua New Guinea
- In office 1973–1976

Personal details
- Born: 25 September 1940 Kundiawa, Simbu Province, Papua New Guinea
- Died: 14 January 2008 (Aged 67)

Sir Joseph Nombri KBE BEM ISO (1940 –2008) was a politician, administrator and diplomat in Papua New Guinea (PNG). He played an important role in events leading up to PNG's independence in 1975 and later became the country's ambassador in Tokyo.

== Early life and education ==
Joseph Karl Nombri was born on 25 September 1940 in Wagl village, Pari, near Kundiawa in the Simbu Province in the Highlands of PNG. He was an only child, with his parents being from the Kamanuku and Kengaku tribes. After schooling in Kundiawa he went to Goroka High School, a provincial school, before transferring to Sogeri High School, one of the country's four (now six) national high schools that prepared students for tertiary education. One of his fellow students at Sogeri was Michael Somare, the future prime minister of PNG. Nombri received a scholarship to study in Australia, after which he joined the new Administrative College in Port Moresby, capital of what was then the Territory of Papua and New Guinea.

== Political life ==
In the mid-1960s, Nombri was a member of the Bully Beef Club, which was a political discussion group made up of students at the Administrative College and others. Somare was a member, as was Albert Maori Kiki, in whose home the meetings were usually held. The Bully Beef Club led to the founding of the Pangu Pati in 1967, with Nombri as its first chairman. Pangu took part in elections for the House of Assembly of Papua and New Guinea in 1968 and 1972 and, in 1975, formed the government of the independent state of Papua New Guinea.

== Career ==
On graduating from the Administrative College, Nombri became a kiap, a district officer or patrol officer who represented the Australian government in the Territory. This was a job that had previously been done mainly by young Australian men. Having been earmarked by the administration as a troublemaker, he was sent to one of the country's most remote places, Kiunga on the Fly River in Western Province, close to the border with Indonesia. He was subsequently transferred to several other locations and became the first Papua New Guinean from the Highlands to be appointed as a district commissioner, first in the Eastern Highlands Province (1971–1972) and then in Morobe Province (1973–1976).

After leaving Morobe, Nombri served as the Public Service Commissioner from 1976 until he resigned in 1979. In 1981, he was appointed as ambassador to Japan, South Korea and China, being based in Tokyo, a position he held for 11 years, becoming the doyen of the Tokyo diplomatic corps. He could have stayed in the post longer but in 1991 he requested to be recalled so that he could be a candidate in the 1992 national election. He stood for the Chimbu Regional seat, but was not elected. Among the investments by Japan and China in PNG that he was able to promote while ambassador was a new hospital for his home town of Kundiawa, which would be renamed after him after his death.

In 2003–04, Nombri was one of five initial candidates in controversial elections in parliament for the position of Governor-General, that also involved Sir Pato Kakaraya, Sir Albert Kipalan, Sir Paulias Matane and Nahau Rooney. Matane eventually emerged victorious after a rerun of the vote and legal challenges.

== Honours ==
Nombri was made an Officer of the Order of the British Empire (OBE), a Member of the same order (MBE) and later received a knighthood (KBE). He also received a British Empire Medal (BEM) and an Imperial Service Medal.

== Death ==
Nombri died in Port Moresby of throat cancer on 14 January 2008. He was buried at the entrance of the hospital in Kundiawa named after him.
