= 1977 Papua New Guinean general election =

- 18 June–9 July 1977
- All 109 seats in the National Parliament; 55 seats needed for a majority
- Turnout: 60.35%
Party	Leader	Seats
Pangu Pati	Michael Somare	30
PPP	Julius Chan	16
United Party	Matthew Taso	23
Papua Besena	Josephine Abaijah	5
Country Party	Sinake Giregire	2
National Party	Thomas Kavali	2
Mataungan Association		3
Independents	–	27
This lists parties that won seats. See the complete results below.

General elections were held in Papua New Guinea between 18 June and 9 July 1977, the first since independence from Australia in 1975. The Pangu Party led by Prime Minister Michael Somare emerged as the largest in the National Parliament. Somare subsequently formed a coalition government with the People's Progress Party (PPP) and several independent MPs. Voter turnout was 60.3%.

== Background ==
The usual four-year term of the House of Assembly was extended to five years shortly before independence, pushing back elections to the renamed National Parliament from 1976 to mid-1977. However, in June 1976 Prime Minister Michael Somare proposed holding early elections in November 1976. Although the proposal was approved by a vote of 45 to 40 in parliament, at least half of the 104 MPs were required to vote in favour for the motion to pass. Prior to the elections, the electoral system was changed from single transferable vote to first-past-the-post.

== Campaign ==
Just under 900 candidates contested the elections, with between two and 21 candidates in each constituency. Ten candidates were women. Polling in the Abau Open constituency was postponed due to the death of a candidate.

== Results ==
Three women – Nahau Rooney, Waliyato Clowes and Josephine Abaijah – were elected, a number not repeated until 2012. Nine ministers lost their seats, a number that increased to ten when Reuben Taureka was defeated in the delayed contest in Abau.

Following the elections, most of the independents joined parties at the first sitting of parliament, with Pangu gaining a further ten seats, the PPP four and Papua Besena and the United Party one, leaving eleven members sitting as independents.

Party	Votes	%	Seats
Pangu Pati		35	30
People's Progress Party		15	16
United Party		10	23
Papua Besena		5	5
Country Party		3	2
National Party		2	2
Mataungan Association			3
Independents		30	27
Vacant			1
Total			109
Total votes	970,172	–	
Registered voters/turnout	1,607,635	60.35	
Source: Nohlen et al., Pacific Islands Monthly

== Aftermath ==
Following the elections, Michael Somare was elected Prime Minister, defeating John Guise (who was supported by the United Party) by 69 votes to 36. Somare established a coalition government of the Pangu Party, the People's Progress Party and some independent members, forming an 18-member cabinet. Kingsford Dibela was elected Speaker and Tei Abal of the United Party became Leader of the Opposition.

Position	Member	Party
Prime Minister	Michael Somare	Pangu Party
Deputy Prime Minister	Julius Chan	People's Progress Party
Minister of Commerce	Pita Lus	Pangu Party
Minister of Decentralisation	John Momis	Independent
Minister of Defence	Louis Mona	People's Progress Party
Minister of Education, Science and Culture	Oscar Tammur	Independent
Minister of Environment, Conservation and Human Settlement	Stephen Tago	Pangu Party
Minister of Finance	Barry Holloway	Pangu Party
Minister of Foreign Relations and Trade	Ebia Olewale	Pangu Party
Minister of Health	Wiwia Korowei	People's Progress Party
Minister of Justice and Liquor Licensing	Delba Biri	Pangu Party
Minister of Labour and Industry	Jacob Lemeki	People's Progress Party
Minister of Media	Tom Koraea	Pangu Party
Minister of Natural Resources	Boyamo Sali	Pangu Party
Minister of Police and Corrective Institutions	Patterson Lowa	Pangu Party
Minister of Public Utilities	Gabriel Bakani	People's Progress Party
Minister of Transport, Works and Supply	Bruce Jephcott	People's Progress Party
Minister of Youth	Pato Kakarya	Independent

Later in 1977, Somare appointed four additional ministers; Yano Belo (PPP) as Minister for Works and Supply, Thomas Kavali (Independent) as Minister for Housing, Karl Kitchens as Minister for Minerals and Energy and Nahau Rooney (Independent) as Minister for Corrective Institutions and Liquor Licensing. Rooney became the first woman to hold a cabinet portfolio in Papua New Guinea.

== See also ==
- Members of the National Parliament of Papua New Guinea, 1977–1982

== Related links ==
- Centre on Democratic Performance Election Results Archive
