= Tei Abal =

Politician in Papua New Guinea

- Born: 1932? Enga Province, Territory of New Guinea
- Died: March 14, 1994; Wabag, Papua New Guinea
- Occupation: Politician
- Known for: One of the "founding fathers" of Papua New Guinea
- Spouse: Nael Abal
- Children: Three sons (including Sam Abal) and three daughters

Sir Tei Abal KBE (1932? – 1994) was a member of the parliament of Papua New Guinea (PNG) between 1964 and 1982, during which time he both served as a government minister in several positions and was leader of the opposition. He was known as an unsuccessful advocate of slowing down the process of PNG's Independence, because he considered that the population from the Highlands areas, of which he was one, were unready for independence.

== Early life ==
Tei Abal was born, around 1932, near Laiagam, in what was then the Western Highlands of the Territory of New Guinea. He was the only son of Abal Monape, a leader of the Temanga clan. His mother died during his childhood, apparently because of devastating frosts that left the Laiagam valley without food. The hunger led father and son to leave home and travel through the Lai Valley in search of food. Abal witnessed his father being murdered by local tribesmen, and subsequently suffered considerable destitution. A couple from Wapenamanda eventually adopted him.

Abal received no formal education. He became a servant of a police constable, and accompanied government officials on tours for census taking and other purposes, learning about the government administration in the process. He taught himself Tok Pisin, a creole language now spoken widely throughout PNG, but he never mastered written or spoken English. Abal trained as a medical orderly in 1947, and later supervised New Guinean staff at Wabag Hospital. His work included carrying out one of the largest immunization programmes ever conducted in Enga. In 1954 he married Nael, daughter of a village leader, which raised his status. When her father was killed during a tribal battle, Abal quickly assumed leadership of the village. This made him able to grow coffee and raise pigs. He also became a gold prospector.

== Political career ==
Encouraged by the Western Highlands district commissioner, Tom Ellis, Abal entered politics. He won the seat of Wabag Open in the 1964 national elections and was re-elected unopposed in 1968, becoming the first person in the country to be elected unopposed. He held the seat in 1972 and 1977. As an under-secretary, he was responsible for labour (1967), and agriculture, livestock, and fisheries (1968 – 71). He also served on the Constitutional Planning Committee. In 1968, he had unsuccessfully argued for a delay in the planned Independence of PNG until the Highlands had caught up with the more developed coastal regions, which had a longer history of exposure to the colonial power. The country became independent in 1975 and the role of Abal in contributing to its emergence as a nation was acknowledged. He was knighted the following year, following the recommendation of the Somare government.

Abal initially formed the Compass Party and then became the first leader of the Highlander-dominated United Party (UP), which won more seats than any other party at the 1972 election. Consequently, he was expected to become chief minister following the introduction of self-government in December 1973. Instead, Pangu Pati's Michael Somare negotiated a national coalition and formed an administration. This failure led Abal to give up leadership of the party to Matthias Toliman, a member of the party from New Britain. When the latter died in 1973, Abal again became leader, focussing primarily on delaying independence. He was a candidate to become the country's first Governor-General, but was placed third in the first round of voting in parliament.

After Iambakey Okuk, a Highlander, became leader of the opposition in May 1978, in part because of Abal's failure to adequately oppose the government, Abal joined the Somare government with other UP members and became minister for public utilities (1978 – 79). He then advocated a single party state; considered to be a politically inept proposal. He suffered a stroke in 1979 and was partially paralysed by a second in 1980. After performing badly in the 1982 national election, he retired from politics.

== Death ==
Abal died at his home near Wabag, on 14 March 1994. He was survived by his wife, three sons, and three daughters. After a state funeral at Wabag Community School, which he had helped found, he was buried at his home in a grave topped by a little house. Over two thousand mourners attended. One of his sons, Sam Abal, later represented Wabag in the national parliament, serving as foreign minister (2007–10), deputy prime minister (2010 – 12) and acting prime minister (2011 – 2012).
