= Thomas Kavali =

Papua New Guinean politician

Sir Thomas Kavali was a politician from Jimi District of Jiwaka Province, Papua New Guinea. He held various ministries portfolio and served under Sir Michael Somare.
