= Albert Maori Kiki =

Papua New Guinean politician (1931–1993)

Sir Albert Maori Kiki

Deputy Prime Minister of Papua New Guinea
- In office 16 September 1975 – 10 August 1977
- Prime Minister: Michael Somare
- Preceded by: New position
- Succeeded by: Julius Chan

Personal details
- Born: Maori Kiki; 21 September 1931 Orokolo Village, Gulf Province, Territory of Papua
- Died: 13 March 1993 (aged 61) Port Moresby, Papua New Guinea
- Party: Pangu Pati
- Spouse: Elizabeth Arivu Miro Kiki (m. 1958)
- Education: Administrative College, Port Moresby
- Occupation: Medical technician

Sir Albert Maori Kiki (21 September 1931 – 13 March 1993) was a Papua New Guinean politician. He was a leading activist for independence and was one of the founders of the Pangu Party. He served as Papua New Guinea's first deputy prime minister from 1975 to 1977 under Michael Somare.

== Early life ==
Born in the Kerema district on the Papuan coast, he was brought up in the Protestant faith in the church of the London Missionary Society. In 1958 he married Elizabeth, a Roman Catholic, in one of the first mixed marriages in the Territory. Albert had been one of a small group of promising students selected by Dr. John Gunther, Director of Health, to study medicine at the Suva Medical School. When he failed his medical exams and was likely to be recalled, he switched his studies to become a pathology technician. On completion of his course, he returned and worked as a technician in the laboratory operated by Dr. Price in the Native Hospital at Ela Beach. His autobiography, Ten Thousand Years in a Lifetime, was published in 1968.

== Politics ==
He was national secretary of the Pangu Party, and after the 1972 elections he entered parliament, and was appointed Minister for Lands and Environment in Michael Somare's government. He was deputy prime minister from 1975 until 1977.

Kiki first stood for parliament at the 1968 Papua New Guinean general election, and succeeded on his second attempt in 1972, winning the Moresby Inland Open seat. He also served on the Port Moresby Town Council from 1971 to 1973.

== Personal life ==
In 1958, Kiki married Elizabeth Arivu Miro, a nurse from the village of Moripi. The couple had five children.

Outside of politics, Kiki was one of the founders of the Rugby Union Association of Papua and New Guinea. After losing his seat in parliament he was involved with a number of business ventures, including the establishment of a piggery outside Port Moresby and poultry and cattle farming. He served as chairman of the PNG Shipping Corporation Ltd and Credit Corporation (PNG) Ltd, and was also on the boards of Kwila Insurance Corporation Ltd and New Guinea Motors Pty Ltd.

Kiki died at his home in Port Moresby on 13 March 1993, aged 61. His body lay in state in the Grand Hall of the National Parliament House and was then interred at Nine Mile Cemetery.

Political offices
New title Position created	Deputy Prime Minister of Papua New Guinea; 1975–1977	Succeeded by Julius Chan
