= Members of the House of Assembly of Papua and New Guinea, 1964–1968 =

This is a list of members of the House of Assembly of Papua and New Guinea from 1964 to 1968. The House of Assembly had of 34 open electorates, 10 electorates reserved for non-indigenous members and 10 official members. The non-official members had been elected at the 1964 election.

| Member | Electorate |
|---|---|
| Tei Abal | Wabag Open |
| Dirona Abe | Rigo-Abau Open |
| Oriel Ashton | New Britain Special |
| Bono Azanifa (Note: Henganofi Open MHA Ugi Biritu died in 1967. Bono Azanifa won the resulting by-election on 15 July 1967.) | Henganofi Open |
| Don Barrett | West Gazelle Special |
| Bill Bloomfield (Note: Kaindi Open MHA Bill Bloomfield died during this term. Tony Voutas won the resulting by-election.) | Kaindi Open |
| Ugi Biritu | Henganofi Open |
| Nicholas Brokam | New Ireland Open |
| Geoffrey Cannon | Official Member (Director of Trade and Industry) |
| William Frederick Carter | Official Member (Director of Posts and Telegraphs) |
| Percy Chatterton | Central Special |
| Knibelt Diria | Minj Open |
| Ian Downs | Highlands Special |
| Edric Eupu | Popondetta Open |
| Graham Gilmore | South Markham Special |
| Sinake Giregire | Goroka Open |
| William Grose | New Guinea Special |
| John Guise | Milne Bay Open |
| John Gunther (Note: John Gunther was replaced as Assistant Administrator (Services) by Les Johnson, already an official member of the House, during this term.) | Official Member (Assistant Administrator - Services) |
| William Conroy (Note: Harold Reeve was replaced as Assistant Administrator (Economic Affairs) by Frank Henderson, already an official member of the House, during this term. Henderson's position was taken by William Conroy.) | Official Member |
| Tom Ellis (Note: John Keith McCarthy was replaced by Tom Ellis as an official member during this term.) | Official Member |
| Frank Henderson | Official Member (Director of Agriculture, Stock and Fisheries) (later Assistant Administrator - Economic Affairs) |
| Barry Holloway | Kainantu Open |
| Leine Iangalo | Wapenamanda Open |
| Poio Iuri | Lagaip Open |
| Meanggarum James | Ramu Open |
| Les Johnson | Official Member (Director of Education; later Assistant Administrator - Services) |
| Ehava Karava | Lakekamu Open |
| Wegra Kenu | Upper Sepik Open |
| Siwi Kurondo | Kerowagi Open |
| Paul Lapun | Bougainville Open |
| Keith Levy | Hagen Open |
| Pita Lus | Dreikikir Open |
| Paliau Maloat | Manus Open |
| Paul Maniel | West New Britain Open |
| Koitaga Mano | Ialibu Open |
| Gaudi Marau | Markham Open |
| Frank Martin | Madang-Sepik Special |
| Noel Mason (Note: Noel Mason ceased to be an official member of the House of Assembly during the course of this term; he does not appear to have been replaced.) | Official Member (Secretary for Labour) |
| Suguman Matibri | Madang Open |
| John Keith McCarthy | Official Member (Director of Native Affairs) |
| Tambu Melo | Kutubu Open |
| Makain Mo | Lumi Open |
| Ron Neville | West Papua Special |
| Anthony Newman | Official Member (Treasurer and Director of Finance) |
| Horace Niall | North Markham Special |
| Momei Pangial | Mendi Open |
| Singin Pasom | Lae Open |
| John Pasquarelli | Angoram Open |
| Pita Simogun | Wewak-Aitape Open |
| Graham Pople | Gumine Open |
| Eriko Rarupu | Moresby Open |
| Harold Reeve | Official Member (Assistant Administrator - Economic Affairs |
| Roy Scragg (Note: Roy Scragg was added as an official member of the House of Assembly during the course of this term.) | Official Member (Director of Health) |
| Waiye Siune | Chimbu Open |
| John Stuntz | East Papua Special |
| Robert Tabua | Fly River Open |
| Pita Tamindei | Maprik Open |
| Keith Tetley | Gulf Open |
| Handabe Tiaba | Tari Open |
| Matthias Toliman | Rabaul Open |
| Stoi Umut | Rai Coast Open |
| Koriam Urekit | East New Britain Open |
| Tony Voutas | Kaindi Open |
| Muriso Warebu | Okapa Open |
| Walter William Watkins | Official Member (Secretary for Law) |
| Lepani Watson | Esa'ala Losuia Open |
| Yauwi Wauwe | Chuave Open |
| Zure Makili Zurecnuoc | Finschhafen Open |

Wilson Unduka Suja||Sohe Open Oro
