= Members of the House of Assembly of Papua and New Guinea, 1968–1972 =

This is a list of members of the House of Assembly of Papua and New Guinea from 1968 to 1972. The House of Assembly had 94 members, increased from 64 in the previous House. There were 69 open electorates, 15 regional electorates and ten official members. The reserved seats for non-indigenous members in the first House were not retained.

At the beginning of the new House, 18 MPs had publicly identified themselves as belonging to political parties: Pangu Party had thirteen (Cecil Abel, Paul Lapun, Pita Lus, John Guise, Mangobing Kakun, Michael Kaniniba, Siwi Kurondo, Paliau Maloat, James Meangarrum, Donatus Mola, Ebia Olewale, Michael Somare and Tony Voutas), the United Democratic Party had two (Yakob Talis and Beibi Yembanda), the All People's Party had two (Dennis Buchanan and James McKinnon), while the Agricultural Reform Party had one (Epineri Titimur).

Member	Electorate
Tei Abal	Wabag Open
Cecil Abel	Milne Bay Regional
Paulus Arek	Ijivitari Open
Pupune Aruno	Lufa Open
Roy Ashton	East and West New Britain Regional
Brere Awol	West Sepik Coastal Open
Bono Azanifa	Henganofi Open
Angmai Bilas	Mabuso Open
Yano Belo	Kagua Open
Daniel Bokap	Kavieng Open
Ninkama Bomai	Gumine Open
Karigi Bonggere	Chimbu Open
Dennis Buchanan	Eastern Highlands Regional
Noel Casey	Kainantu Open
Julius Chan	Namatanai Open
Percy Chatterton	Moresby Open
Virgil Counsel	Western and Gulf Regional
Lindsay Curtis (Note: Secretary for Law Walter William Watkins retired during this term and was replaced by Lindsay Curtis.) (Note: Secretary for Law Lindsay Curtis, who had replaced W. W. Watkins, resigned later in the term and was replaced by Bill Kearney.)	Official Member
Kaibelt Diria	Wahgi Open
Kaura Duba (Note: Jimi Open MHA Kaura Duba died during this term. Thomas Kavali won the by-election to replace him.)	Jimi Open
Warren Dutton	North Fly Open
Tegi Ebei’al	Nipa Open
Tom Ellis	Official Member
Katigame Endekan	Sobe Open
Norman Evennett (Note: Esa'ala Open MHA Norman Evennett died during this term. Tim Ward won the by-election to replace him.)	Esa'ala Open
William Fielding	Northern Regional
Mick Foley	Official Member
Ronald Galloway	Official Member
Rauke Gam	Kabwum Open
Jason Garrett	Madang Regional
Sinake Giregire	Daulo Open
Donald Grove	Official Member
John Guise	Alotau Open
Frank Henderson (Note: Assistant Administrator (Economic Affairs) Frank Henderson died during this term. He was replaced by James Ritchie.)	Official Member
Leine Iangalo	Wapenamanda Open
Poio Iuri	Lagaip Open
Wesani Iwoksim	Upper Sepik Open
Les Johnson (Note: Assistant Administrator (Services) Les Johnson became Administrator of Papua New Guinea during this term and was not replaced.)	Official Member
Peter Johnson	Bogia Open
Bill Kearney	Official Member
Paul Langro	West Sepik Regional
Paul Lapun	South Bougainville Open
Walter Lussick	Manus and New Ireland Regional
Mangobing Kakun	Munya Open
Taimya Kambipi	Kompiam-Baiyer Open
Michael Kaniniba	Huon Gulf Open
Toua Kapena	Hiri Open
Thomas Kavali	Jimi Open
Sabumei Kofikai	Goroka Open
Tom Koraea	Kikori Open
Siwi Kurondo	Kerowagi Open
Tom Leahy	Markham Open
Charles Littler	Official Member
Tore Lokoloko	Kerema Open
Joseph Lue	Bougainville Regional
Pita Lus	Maprik Open
John Maneke	Talasea Open
Koitaga Mano	Kandep-Tambul Open
Anani Maino	Kaindi Open
Paliau Maloat	Manus Open
James McKinnon	Middle Ramu Open
John Middleton	Sumkar Open
James Meanggarum	Angoram Open
Donatus Mola	North Bougainville Open
Louis Mona	Goilala Open
Uauwi Wauwe Moses	Chuave Open
Ron Neville	Southern Highlands Regional
Anthony Newman	Official Member
John Nilles (Note: Chimbu Regional MHA Eric Pyne resigned on 18 February 1970. John Nilles won the by-election to replace him.)	Chimbu Regional
Patik Nimanbor	Nawae Open
Mek Nugintz	Mul-Dei Open
Oala Oala-Rarua	Central Regional
Ebia Olewale	South Fly Open
Pena Ou	Hagen Open
Momei Pangial	Mendi Open
John Poe	Rai Coast Open
Eric Pyne	Chimbu Regional
Harry Ritchie (Note: Assistant Administrator (Economic Affairs) James Ritchie, who had replaced Frank Henderson, resigned later in the term. He was replaced by Harry Ritchie.)	Official Member
James Ritchie	Official Member
Nauwi Sauinambi	Ambunti-Yangoru Open
Herbert Seale (Note: Official member Herbert Seale, who had been the District Commissioner at Lae, resigned during this term and was not replaced.)	Official Member
Meck Singilong	Finschhafen Open
Michael Somare	East Sepik Regional
Yakob Talis	Wapei-Nuku Open
Oscar Tammur	Kokopo Open
Epineri Titimur	Rabaul Open
Matthias Toliman	Gazelle Open
Kokomo Ulia	Dreikikir Open
Nathaniel Uroe	Rigo-Abau Open
Koriam Urekit	Kandrian-Pomio Open
Tony Voutas	Morobe Regional
Andrew Wabiria	Koroba Open
Tim Ward	Esa'ala Open
Muriso Warebu	Okapa Open
Turi Wari	Ialibu Open
Walter William Watkins	Official Member
Lepani Watson	Kula Open
John Watts	Western Highlands Regional
Beibi Yambanda	Wewak Open
Matiabe Yuwi	Tari Open
