= 1964 Papua New Guinean general election =

General elections were held in the Territory of Papua and New Guinea between 15 February and 15 March 1964. They were the first elections in the territory held under universal suffrage. Voter turnout among enrolled voters was 65%.

== Background ==
In March 1962 the Papua New Guinea Select Committee on Political Development was set up to identify future amendments to political arrangements in the territory. Following the visit of a United Nations mission that proposed a 100-member legislature, the committee toured the territory in September and October, taking evidence from over 450 residents. An interim report was presented to the Legislative Council in October, and subsequently approved by the Australian government.

The 37-member Legislative Council (which had only twelve elected members) was replaced with a 64-member House of Assembly. The new legislature had 10 official members (civil servants) and 54 elected members, of which 10 were elected from reserved constituencies in which only Europeans (who numbered around 25,000 of the total population of around two million) could be candidates; Europeans could also run in the non-reserved constituencies. Voters cast two votes; one for a general constituency candidate and one for a reserved constituency candidate. The voting age was set at 21. The electoral roll was created over several months in 1963, with field staff of the Native Affairs Department visiting over 12,000 villages and recording the names of all adults in the territory, except in an area of 6,000 square miles that were classed as "restricted" due to the likelihood of being attacked by the inhabitants. A total of 1,029,192 voters were registered.

Candidates were required to have lived in their constituency for at least 12 months, and to have a home there. A preferential voting system was used, with candidates required to gain a majority to be elected.

== Campaign ==
A total of 299 candidates contested the 54 seats, of which 238 were indigenous and 61 Europeans; 31 of the Europeans contested the 10 reserved seats and 30 ran in the general constituencies. One seat – North Markham Reserved – had only one candidate (Horrie Niall), who was elected unopposed.

Ten of the twelve MLCs elected in 1961 ran for re-election, with only John Chipper and Paul Mason not standing. Three of the candidates for the general constituencies were former or present cargo cult leaders, Francis Hagai, Paliau Maloat and Yali. Although Yali ran in the Rai Coast constituency, numerous voters in the neighbouring Madang constituency attempted to vote for him, submitting blank votes after being told he was not on their ballot.

== Results ==
Of the 44 open constituencies, 38 were won by indigenous candidates and six by Europeans. 35 of the 38 indigenous members were new to the legislature, with only Nicholas Brokam, John Guise and Pita Simogun having previously been members of the Legislative Council. Four of the 16 Europeans had previously been MLCs.

Preference votes only changed the result in five of the 44 open constituencies.

Open constituencies
| Constituency | Candidate | Final preference count | Notes |
|---|---|---|---|
| Angoram (19,676 registered) | John Pasquarelli | 6,723 | Elected |
| Angoram (19,676 registered) | William Eichhorn | 6,495 | |
| Angoram (19,676 registered) | Sumbiri Kwoiyan | 3,649 | |
| Angoram (19,676 registered) | Bonjui Pius | 2,994 | |
| Angoram (19,676 registered) | Sumare Sana | 1,600 | |
| Angoram (19,676 registered) | Yambunbei Walinga | 1,388 | |
| Angoram (19,676 registered) | Mas Niangri | 936 | |
| Angoram (19,676 registered) | Olimei Nausambin | 753 | |
| Angoram (19,676 registered) | Billy Kiton | 486 | |
| Angoram (19,676 registered) | Kontrak Nokan | 459 | |
| Angoram (19,676 registered) | Stephen Wingu | 298 | |
| Bougainville (30,311 registered) | Paul Lapun | 13,638 | Elected |
| Bougainville (30,311 registered) | Anton Kearei | 4,810 | |
| Bougainville (30,311 registered) | Severinus Ampaoi | 4,700 | |
| Bougainville (30,311 registered) | Andrew Komoro | 4,255 | |
| Bougainville (30,311 registered) | John Hakena | 1,948 | |
| Bougainville (30,311 registered) | Francis Hagai | 1,667 | |
| Bougainville (30,311 registered) | Nelson Laiisi Iaru | 1,206 | |
| Bougainville (30,311 registered) | Matevisiana Maikol Witoi | 408 | |
| Bougainville (30,311 registered) | John Ambrose Karuah Keisen | 197 | |
| Chimbu (27,645 registered) | Waiye Siune | 3,415 | Elected |
| Chimbu (27,645 registered) | Josep Kauga | 3,205 | |
| Chimbu (27,645 registered) | Kondom Agaundo | 2,840 | |
| Chimbu (27,645 registered) | Aulakua Wemin | 2,085 | |
| Chimbu (27,645 registered) | Willie Kunauna | 1,145 | |
| Chimbu (27,645 registered) | Kugame Amug | 817 | |
| Chimbu (27,645 registered) | Juainde lual | 619 | |
| Chimbu (27,645 registered) | Kambua Mongia | 522 | |
| Chimbu (27,645 registered) | Karil Bonggere | 499 | |
| Chimbu (27,645 registered) | Kwatininem Kuman | 324 | |
| Chimbu (27,645 registered) | Nindikay Pagau | 180 | |
| Chuave (25,098 registered) | Yauwi Wauwe | 8,245 | Elected |
| Chuave (25,098 registered) | Launa Mewea | 2,797 | |
| Chuave (25,098 registered) | Kelaka Eremoke | 2,524 | |
| Chuave (25,098 registered) | Brian Heagney | 2,383 | |
| Dreikikir (23,462 registered) | Pita Lus | 8,620 | Elected |
| Dreikikir (23,462 registered) | Waiu Weimba | 7,274 | |
| Dreikikir (23,462 registered) | Bilpal Masakim | 3,841 | |
| Dreikikir (23,462 registered) | Joseph Langu | 3,196 | |
| Dreikikir (23,462 registered) | Nohunga Umbu'ha | 1,922 | |
| Dreikikir (23,462 registered) | Andahiga Nauli | 622 | |
| East New Britain (19,850 registered) | Koriam Urekit | 7,217 | Elected |
| East New Britain (19,850 registered) | Vin ToBaining | 2,433 | |
| East New Britain (19,850 registered) | Stanis Boramilat | 2,390 | |
| East New Britain (19,850 registered) | Napitalai Tolirom | 723 | |
| East New Britain (19,850 registered) | Tomeriba Tomakala | 700 | |
| East New Britain (19,850 registered) | Longkurumia Joseph | 470 | |
| Esa'ala Losuia (23,330 registered) | Lepani Watson | 7,825 | Elected |
| Esa'ala Losuia (23,330 registered) | Kelemalisi Clem Rich | 3,199 | |
| Esa'ala Losuia (23,330 registered) | Goweli Taurega | 2,109 | |
| Esa'ala Losuia (23,330 registered) | Pologa Leatani Baloiloi | 1,045 | |
| Esa'ala Losuia (23,330 registered) | Jack Wilkinson | 649 | |
| Esa'ala Losuia (23,330 registered) | Wilson Dobunaba | 566 | |
| Finschhafen (21,059 registered) | Zure Makili Zurecnuoc | 8,029 | Elected |
| Finschhafen (21,059 registered) | Somu Sigob | 4,370 | |
| Finschhafen (21,059 registered) | Meek Singiliong | 2,727 | |
| Finschhafen (21,059 registered) | Oku Zongetsia | 1,160 | |
| Finschhafen (21,059 registered) | Jack Roy Smith | 1,015 | |
| Finschhafen (21,059 registered) | Ompampawe | 823 | |
| Finschhafen (21,059 registered) | Taikone Buyumbun | 515 | |
| Fly River (16,243 registered) | Robert Tabua | 6,765 | Elected |
| Fly River (16,243 registered) | Arthur Wyborn | 4,698 | |
| Fly River (16,243 registered) | Simoi Paradi | 2,307 | |
| Fly River (16,243 registered) | Paho (Paho-Wageba) | 1,539 | |
| Fly River (16,243 registered) | Jacob Wamabon | 1,212 | |
| Goroka (29,440 registered) | Sinake Giregire | 7,657 | Elected |
| Goroka (29,440 registered) | John Wells | 6,567 | |
| Goroka (29,440 registered) | Sapume Kofikai | 5,240 | |
| Goroka (29,440 registered) | Bimai Palae | 3,823 | |
| Goroka (29,440 registered) | Akepa Miakwei | 2,875 | |
| Goroka (29,440 registered) | Duwe Afiyai | 1,732 | |
| Goroka (29,440 registered) | John Akunai | 1,150 | |
| Goroka (29,440 registered) | Ikeivannima Gia | 1,084 | |
| Goroka (29,440 registered) | Soso Subi | 775 | |
| Goroka (29,440 registered) | Madang Obuseri | 600 | |
| Goroka (29,440 registered) | Bin Aravaki | 467 | |
| Gulf (21,662 registered) | Keith Tetley | 6,640 | Elected |
| Gulf (21,662 registered) | Sawaleba | 5,862 | |
| Gulf (21,662 registered) | V. B. Counsel | 3,730 | |
| Gulf (21,662 registered) | Samai Nahomu | 1,845 | |
| Gulf (21,662 registered) | Boruwo Kauwamu | 1,109 | |
| Gulf (21,662 registered) | Morea Pekoro | 705 | |
| Gumine (23,601 registered) | Graham Pople | 7,719 | Elected |
| Gumine (23,601 registered) | Ninkama Bomai | 2,421 | |
| Hagen (24,814 registered) | Keith Levy | 12,274 | Elected |
| Hagen (24,814 registered) | Pena Ou | 8,159 | |
| Hagen (24,814 registered) | Kup Ogut | 4,563 | |
| Hagen (24,814 registered) | Komo Dei | 1,604 | |
| Hagen (24,814 registered) | John Colman | 1,481 | |
| Henganofi (20,424 registered) | Ugi Biritu | 9,228 | Elected |
| Henganofi (20,424 registered) | Bono Azanifa | 8,299 | |
| Henganofi (20,424 registered) | Pupuna Aruno | 3,822 | |
| Henganofi (20,424 registered) | Posi Latara'oi | 1,772 | |
| Henganofi (20,424 registered) | Forapi Maunori | 787 | |
| Ialibu (26,833 registered) | Koitaga Mano | 11,498 | Elected |
| Ialibu (26,833 registered) | Turi Wari | 3,443 | |
| Ialibu (26,833 registered) | Karia (Wanu) | 3,072 | |
| Ialibu (26,833 registered) | Tua Piya | 1,913 | |
| Ialibu (26,833 registered) | Puruba Wambi | 1,090 | |
| Ialibu (26,833 registered) | Piliembo Ugu | 670 | |
| Ialibu (26,833 registered) | Poi'ia Ibubu | 463 | |
| Ialibu (26,833 registered) | Iamuna Windi | 118 | |
| Ialibu (26,833 registered) | Ata Lenga | 40 | |
| Kainantu (23,291 registered) | Barry Holloway | 8,350 | Elected |
| Kainantu (23,291 registered) | Touke Mareka | 2,859 | |
| Kainantu (23,291 registered) | Ono Aia | 2,644 | |
| Kainantu (23,291 registered) | Akila Inivigo | 2,352 | |
| Kainantu (23,291 registered) | Manki Kaoti | 2,049 | |
| Kainantu (23,291 registered) | To'ito Simau'ampe | 1,165 | |
| Kaindi (27,221 registered) | Bill Bloomfield | 9,007 | Elected |
| Kaindi (27,221 registered) | David Iti | 6,407 | |
| Kaindi (27,221 registered) | Anani Maniau | 3,974 | |
| Kaindi (27,221 registered) | Su Kate (Kekalem) | 1,842 | |
| Kaindi (27,221 registered) | Isom Kaia (Phillip) | 1,780 | |
| Kaindi (27,221 registered) | Ninga Yamung | 1,379 | |
| Kaindi (27,221 registered) | Leiwa Monbong | 939 | |
| Kaindi (27,221 registered) | Mangi Iom | 388 | |
| Kaindi (27,221 registered) | James William Gould | 254 | |
| Kerowagi (18,951 registered) | Siwi Kurondo | 8,409 | Elected |
| Kerowagi (18,951 registered) | Wena Amugl | 5,902 | |
| Kerowagi (18,951 registered) | Asuwe Kawage | 1,615 | |
| Kerowagi (18,951 registered) | Urambo Gomangogl | 1,276 | |
| Kutubu (18,461 registered) | Tambu Melo | 8,047 | Elected |
| Kutubu (18,461 registered) | Wayabo Awa | 5,391 | |
| Kutubu (18,461 registered) | Konifabu Iore | 2,918 | |
| Kutubu (18,461 registered) | Kiras Tombala | 1,077 | |
| Lae (28,118 registered) | Singin Pasom | 10,428 | Elected |
| Lae (28,118 registered) | Kahu Sugoho | 7,041 | |
| Lae (28,118 registered) | Kobubu Airia | 4,419 | |
| Lae (28,118 registered) | Christian Gwang | 2,693 | |
| Lae (28,118 registered) | Silas Kamake | 1,340 | |
| Lagaip (21,990 registered) | Poio Iuri | 9,243 | Elected |
| Lagaip (21,990 registered) | Nenk Pasu | 5,153 | |
| Lagaip (21,990 registered) | Liopa Momabu | 3,522 | |
| Lagaip (21,990 registered) | Kora Wabe | 1,073 | |
| Lakekamu | Ehava Karava | 6,258 | Elected |
| Lakekamu | Alan Baupua | 4,323 | |
| Lakekamu | Kevin Alphonse Kassman | 1,438 | |
| Lumi (21,532 registered) | Makain Mo | 7,526 | Elected |
| Lumi (21,532 registered) | Misama Warambor | 5,758 | |
| Lumi (21,532 registered) | Mans Solmin | 3,460 | |
| Lumi (21,532 registered) | Waringli Amaraho | 2,912 | |
| Lumi (21,532 registered) | Bun Wasau | 1,898 | |
| Lumi (21,532 registered) | Paine Maiyene | 1,304 | |
| Madang (27,284 registered) | Suguman Matibri | 7,481 | Elected |
| Madang (27,284 registered) | Bato Bultin | 6,701 | |
| Madang (27,284 registered) | Shirley Ann Mackellar | 2,816 | |
| Manus (9,121 registered) | Paliau Maloat | 3,357 | Elected |
| Manus (9,121 registered) | Joseph Malai | 2,713 | |
| Manus (9,121 registered) | Peter Pomat | 1,203 | |
| Manus (9,121 registered) | John Mohei | 510 | |
| Manus (9,121 registered) | Cholai Popinau | 208 | |
| Manus (9,121 registered) | Joel Maiah | 127 | |
| Maprik (21,850 registered) | Pita Tamindei | 7,799 | Elected |
| Maprik (21,850 registered) | Boigun Raki | 5,837 | |
| Maprik (21,850 registered) | Kumasi Manga | 4,611 | |
| Maprik (21,850 registered) | Stefan Mairabi | 3,040 | |
| Maprik (21,850 registered) | Godfried Wogiamungu | 2,396 | |
| Maprik (21,850 registered) | Namani Anjabia | 1,554 | |
| Markham (20,608 registered) | Gaudi Mirau | 6,431 | Elected |
| Markham (20,608 registered) | Tom Leahy | 6,165 | |
| Markham (20,608 registered) | Bruce Reginald Jephcott | 4,404 | |
| Markham (20,608 registered) | Timas Paia | 3,417 | |
| Markham (20,608 registered) | Malangan Fridolin | 2,924 | |
| Markham (20,608 registered) | Tataeng Nabia | 1,166 | |
| Mendi (28,557 registered) | Momei Pangial | 8,426 | Elected |
| Mendi (28,557 registered) | Komia Dualt | 5,289 | |
| Mendi (28,557 registered) | Ebi Wali | 1,452 | |
| Mendi (28,557 registered) | Hananel Tiol | 1,007 | |
| Mendi (28,557 registered) | Iebil Kalt | 2,051 | |
| Milne Bay (25,071 registered) | John Guise | 17,045 | Elected |
| Milne Bay (25,071 registered) | Bob Bunting | 1,990 | |
| Milne Bay (25,071 registered) | Osineru Dickson | 564 | |
| Milne Bay (25,071 registered) | Albert Munt | 137 | |
| Minj (30,887 registered) | Kaibelt Diria | 8,568 | Elected |
| Minj (30,887 registered) | Ian Parsons | 6,715 | |
| Minj (30,887 registered) | Nopnop Tol | 5,291 | |
| Minj (30,887 registered) | Paulus Waine | 1,782 | |
| Minj (30,887 registered) | Brian Corrigan | 379 | |
| Moresby (28,502 registered) | Eriko Rarupu | 8,867 | Elected |
| Moresby (28,502 registered) | Oala Oala-Rarua | 6,243 | |
| Moresby (28,502 registered) | Bia Maini | 3,057 | |
| Moresby (28,502 registered) | Colin J. Sefton | 2,008 | |
| Moresby (28,502 registered) | John Martin | 1,484 | |
| Moresby (28,502 registered) | Bill Dihm Junior | 1,298 | |
| Moresby (28,502 registered) | Kaita Kau | 1,250 | |
| Moresby (28,502 registered) | Willie Gavera | 1,119 | |
| Moresby (28,502 registered) | Bill Stansfield | 535 | |
| Moresby (28,502 registered) | Ana Frank | 273 | |
| Moresby (28,502 registered) | Weina Babaga | 157 | |
| Moresby (28,502 registered) | Daera Ganiga | 146 | |
| New Ireland (23,752 registered) | Nicholas Brokam | 6,768 | Elected |
| New Ireland (23,752 registered) | Peter Murray | 5,197 | |
| New Ireland (23,752 registered) | Joseph Watori | 3,550 | |
| New Ireland (23,752 registered) | Tovin Kiapsolo | 2,928 | |
| New Ireland (23,752 registered) | Bruno Kroening | 946 | |
| New Ireland (23,752 registered) | Magilang | 727 | |
| Okapa (18,571 registered) | Muriso Warebu | 7,322 | Elected |
| Okapa (18,571 registered) | Kangeto Yabise | 3,440 | |
| Okapa (18,571 registered) | Kege Yasinamo | 1,909 | |
| Okapa (18,571 registered) | Mangko Yai | 1,546 | |
| Okapa (18,571 registered) | Asa Kabo | 807 | |
| Popondetta (24,869 registered) | Edric Eupu | 8,679 | Elected |
| Popondetta (24,869 registered) | Paulus Arek | 5,704 | |
| Popondetta (24,869 registered) | Conway Sesewo Ihove | 4,511 | |
| Popondetta (24,869 registered) | Philip Undaba | 1,216 | |
| Popondetta (24,869 registered) | Cedric Siebel | 931 | |
| Rabaul (23,639 registered) | Matthias Toliman | 7,282 | Elected |
| Rabaul (23,639 registered) | Epineri Titimur | 5,310 | |
| Rabaul (23,639 registered) | Nason Tokiala | 2,400 | |
| Rabaul (23,639 registered) | Tomari Topakana | 568 | |
| Rabaul (23,639 registered) | Lawrence Tolavutul | 270 | |
| Rai Coast (26,806 registered) | Stoi Umut | 9,183 | Elected |
| Rai Coast (26,806 registered) | A Tarosi | 3,789 | |
| Rai Coast (26,806 registered) | Yali Singina | 2,583 | |
| Rai Coast (26,806 registered) | Lotu Lisa | 1,701 | |
| Rai Coast (26,806 registered) | Batta Yamai | 1,377 | |
| Rai Coast (26,806 registered) | Langong Sungai | 526 | |
| Rai Coast (26,806 registered) | John Kikang | 271 | |
| Rai Coast (26,806 registered) | Medaing Gulungor | 47 | |
| Rai Coast (26,806 registered) | Gau Jabile | 18 | |
| Ramu (29,269 registered) | James Meanggarum | 9,133 | Elected |
| Ramu (29,269 registered) | Watson Griffith Hall | 6,969 | |
| Ramu (29,269 registered) | Tom Maguna | 4,498 | |
| Ramu (29,269 registered) | John Bareng Mundau | 3,064 | |
| Rigo–Abau (20,608 registered) | Dirona Abe | 6,366 | Elected |
| Rigo–Abau (20,608 registered) | Scotty Uroe | 3,923 | |
| Rigo–Abau (20,608 registered) | Enoka Tom | 3,263 | |
| Rigo–Abau (20,608 registered) | Cliff Ianamu | 3,065 | |
| Rigo–Abau (20,608 registered) | John Meikle | 1,899 | |
| Rigo–Abau (20,608 registered) | Les Farley | 1,220 | |
| Rigo–Abau (20,608 registered) | Veratau Reuben | 710 | |
| Tari (22,672 registered) | Handabe Tiabe | 11,537 | Elected |
| Tari (22,672 registered) | Pungwa Tiri | 11,154 | |
| Tari (22,672 registered) | Andagari Wabiria | 6,054 | |
| Tari (22,672 registered) | Megelia Babagi | 3,903 | |
| Tari (22,672 registered) | Tagobe (John) | 3,497 | |
| Tari (22,672 registered) | Matthew Mapiria (Yaliga) | 1,223 | |
| Upper Sepik (18,491 registered) | Wegra Kenu | 7,304 | Elected |
| Upper Sepik (18,491 registered) | Wesani Iboksimnok | 5,244 | |
| Upper Sepik (18,491 registered) | Ondrias Augwi | 3,522 | |
| Upper Sepik (18,491 registered) | Mason Ambunyigi | 1,619 | |
| Upper Sepik (18,491 registered) | Fatemboko Kauminja | 1,107 | |
| Wabag (23,411 registered) | Tei Abal | 7,861 | Elected |
| Wabag (23,411 registered) | Punaben Minsakoli | 3,506 | |
| Wabag (23,411 registered) | Kibunki Tomben | 2,190 | |
| Wabag (23,411 registered) | Timon Rot | 1,831 | |
| Wapenamanda (23,834 registered) | Leme Iangalo | 9,001 | Elected |
| Wapenamanda (23,834 registered) | Traimya Manyingiwa | 4,698 | |
| Wapenamanda (23,834 registered) | Erikio Karok | 2,862 | |
| Wapenamanda (23,834 registered) | Powai Kikya | 1,949 | |
| Wapenamanda (23,834 registered) | Ian Kleinig | 1,062 | |
| West New Britain (19,109 registered) | Pael Manlel | 6,889 | Elected |
| West New Britain (19,109 registered) | Kaiwa Theodore Laula | 5,970 | |
| West New Britain (19,109 registered) | Lima (Yohanis) Larebo | 2,334 | |
| West New Britain (19,109 registered) | Hans Wetzel | 3,321 | |
| West New Britain (19,109 registered) | Aisapu Talavi (Ganor) | 2,664 | |
| West New Britain (19,109 registered) | Joe Reio (Reu Mauta) | 1,857 | |
| West New Britain (19,109 registered) | Tel Kaumu (Kulu) | 1,193 | |
| West New Britain (19,109 registered) | Lantene Koha | 1,074 | |
| West New Britain (19,109 registered) | Boas Kulei Galia | 680 | |
| Wewak–Aitape (23,069 registered) | Pita Simogun | 10,615 | Elected |
| Wewak–Aitape (23,069 registered) | Bais Yembinangra | 6,063 | |
| Wewak–Aitape (23,069 registered) | Brere Awol | 4,581 | |
| Wewak–Aitape (23,069 registered) | George Panao | 2,581 | |
| Wewak–Aitape (23,069 registered) | Pita Kamara | 144 | |
| Wewak–Aitape (23,069 registered) | Jim Simbago | 422 | |
Reserved constituencies
| Central | Percy Chatterton | 6,602 | Elected |
| Central | Ron Brennan | 5,598 | |
| Central | Andy Anderson | 3,535 | |
| Central | Bert Pikett | 2,957 | |
| Central | Charles Kilduff | 819 | |
| Central | Kay Ashcroft-Smith | 429 | |
| East Papua | John Stuntz | 35,833 | Elected |
| East Papua | Kevin Fletcher | 8,564 | |
| East Papua | M. A. Lakin | 5,164 | |
| Highlands | Ian Downs | 126,457 | Elected |
| Highlands | Dennis Buchanan | 38,769 | |
| Madang–Sepik | Frank Martin | 68,281 | Elected |
| Madang–Sepik | Kepten Flevel | 44,084 | |
| Madang–Sepik | John Middleton | 34,395 | |
| New Britain | Roy Ashton | 12,741 | Elected |
| New Britain | Tom Garrett | 6,517 | |
| New Britain | Ron Levi | 4,618 | |
| New Britain | Blue Morris | 2,954 | |
| New Guinea Islands | Jim Grose | 22,786 | Elected |
| New Guinea Islands | Gordon Smith | 4,793 | |
| New Guinea Islands | Harry Croyden | 9,090 | |
| North Markham | Horrie Niall | – | Elected |
| South Markham | Graham Gilmore | 9,311 | Elected |
| South Markham | Lloyd Hurrell | 8,963 | |
| South Markham | Mick Casey | 5,658 | |
| West Gazelle | Don Barrett | 6,407 | Elected |
| West Gazelle | Albert Price | 5,021 | |
| West Gazelle | Harry Spanner | 3,021 | |
| West Gazelle | Keith Edwin Cummings | 2,217 | |
| West Papua | Ron Neville | 68,335 | Elected |
| West Papua | Ron Slaughter | 38,950 | |
Source: Pacific Islands Monthly

=== Official members ===
| Position | Member |
|---|---|
| Assistant Administrator (Economic Affairs) | Harold Reeve |
| Assistant Administrator (Services) | John Gunther |
| Director of Agriculture, Stock and Fisheries | Frank Henderson |
| Director of Education | Les Johnson |
| Director of Native Affairs | John Keith McCarthy |
| Director of Posts and Telegraphs | William Frederick Carter |
| Director of Trade and Industry | Geoffrey Desmond Cannon |
| Secretary for Labour | Noel John Mason |
| Secretary for Law | Walter William Watkins |
| Treasurer | Anthony Philip Newman |
Source: Pacific Islands Monthly

== Aftermath ==
Following the elections, the requirement under electoral law for candidates to achieve an absolute majority of votes in their constituency to be elected became a controversial issue; as many voters did not use their preference votes, there were 32 constituencies where no candidate achieved a majority. In April Mick Casey, a losing candidate in South Markham, notified the Electoral officer that he intended to file an appeal. However, Casey did not file his appeal, and the electoral law was amended on 16 June to remove the requirement for an absolute majority.

When the new House of Assembly met for the first time on 8 June, Horrie Niall was elected Speaker unopposed. One of the first decisions made was that only English, Tok Pisin and Hiri Motu would be used in the Assembly, after Handabe Tiabe (who spoke none of the three languages) attempted to bring his translator into the chamber.

The Administrator Donald Cleland subsequently appointed an Administrator's Council and ten Parliamentary Under-Secretaries from amongst the indigenous members.

Administrator's Council
| Position | Member |
|---|---|
| Officials | John Gunther |
| Officials | John Keith McCarthy |
| Officials | Harold Reeve |
| Elected members | Nicholas Brokam |
| Elected members | Ian Downs |
| Elected members | John Guise |
| Elected members | John Stuntz |
| Elected members | Robert Tabua |
| Elected members | Matthias Toliman |
| Elected members | Zure Makili Zurecnuoc |
Parliamentary Under-Secretaries
| Position | Member |
| Administration | Matthias Toliman |
| Economic Affairs | Nicholas Brokam |
| Forests | Paul Lapun |
| Health | Dirona Abe |
| Lands | Edric Eupu |
| News and Information | John Guise |
| Police | Pita Simogun |
| Services | Sinake Giregire |
| Treasury | Zure Makili Zurecnuoc |
| Works | Robert Tabua |

== See also ==
- Members of the House of Assembly of Papua and New Guinea, 1964–1968
