= 1961 Papua New Guinean general election =

General elections were held in the Territory of Papua and New Guinea on 18 March 1961. Indigenous members were elected for the first time, although on an indirect basis. The territory's first political party, the United Progress Party, won three seats.

== Background ==
In September 1960 the Australian government announced that the Legislative Council would be expanded. Having previously been a 29-member body with 17 officials (civil servants), nine appointed members and three elected members, the new council was to have 37 members, of which 15 were officials, 10 were appointees (of which at least five would be indigenous members) and twelve were elected. The twelve elected members would consist of six Europeans elected directly from single-member constituencies, and six indigenous members indirectly elected from the same constituencies.

The indirect elections for the indigenous members saw 220 representatives nominated by 39 Native Local Government Council and 144 representatives nominated by 33 special electoral groups, covering areas where no Native Local Government Council existed. The 364 representatives subsequently elected the six indigenous members of the Legislative Council.

== Campaign ==
A total of 108 candidates contested the six indigenous seats, whilst only nine ran in the six European seats, leaving three candidates elected unopposed.

Constituency	European candidates	Indigenous candidates
New Britain	Don Barrett (incumbent, UPP), John Chipper	12
New Guinea Coastal	Lloyd Hurrell (incumbent)	7
New Guinea Highlands	Ian Downs (UPP)	40
New Guinea Islands	W. Meehan (UPP), Paul Mason	25
Western Papua	Craig Kirke (incumbent, UPP), Ron Slaughter	13
Eastern Papua	John Stuntz (UPP)	11

== Results ==
Constituency	European elected member	Indigenous elected member
Eastern Papua	John Stuntz (UPP)	John Guise
Highlands	Ian Downs (UPP)	Kondom Agaundo
New Britain	John Chipper	Vin ToBaining
New Guinea Coastal	Lloyd Hurrell	Somu Sigob
New Guinea Islands	Paul Mason	Nicholas Brokam
Western Papua	Ron Slaughter (UPP)	Simoi Paradi
Source: Pacific Islands Monthly

=== Nominated members ===
Position	Member
Assistant Administrator	John Gunther
Chief Collector of Customs	K.M. Chambers
Chief Native Lands Commissioner	Ivan Champion
Director of Agriculture, Stock and Fisheries	Frank Henderson
Director of Education	Geoffrey Roscoe
Director of Lands, Surveys and Mines	Douglas Macinnis
Director of Native Affairs	John Keith McCarthy
Director of Posts and Telegraphs	William Frederick Carter
Director of Public Health	Roy Scragg
Director of Public Works	J. Glen
District Commissioner, Morobe	Horrie Niall
District Commissioner, New Britain	John Rollo Foldi
Secretary for Law	Walter William Watkins
Treasurer and Director of Finance	Harold Reeve
Appointed members	Roma Bates
Appointed members	Basil Fairfax-Ross
Appointed members	Ephraim Jubilee
Appointed members	Bonjul Korogo
Appointed members	Maneto Kuradal
Appointed members	John McGhee
Appointed members	Philip Strong
Appointed members	Reuben Taureka
Appointed members	Kinuki Wabag
Appointed members	Alice Wedega
Source: Pacific Islands Monthly

== Aftermath ==
Following the elections, the Administrator appointed the Administrator's Council, the territory's cabinet.

Position	Member
Assistant Administrator	John Gunther
Director of Native Affairs	John Keith McCarthy
Treasurer	Harold Reeve
Unofficial members	Basil Fairfax-Ross
Unofficial members	Ian Downs
Unofficial members	John Guise
