= Atiheme Kimi =

Papua New Guinean politician

Member of the House of Assembly
- In office 1972–1973
- Preceded by: Bono Azanifa
- Succeeded by: Bono Azanifa
- Constituency: Henganofi

Personal details
- Died: August 1973; Eastern Highlands, Papua New Guinea

Atiheme Kimi (died August 1973) was a Papua New Guinean politician. He served as a member of the House of Assembly between 1972 and 1973.

== Biography ==
In 1952 Kimi began work as an interpreter at the Henganofi Sub-District Office. In 1964 he was elected to Kafe Local Government Council, serving as president of the council between 1964 and 1968. In 1967 he contested a by-election for the Henganofi constituency of the House of Assembly. However, he finished last of seven candidates, and was eliminated in the first count.

Kimi contested the Henganofi seat again in the 1968 general elections, but was again unsuccessful, finishing sixth of eight candidates in the first count. He resigned as an interpreter to contest the 1972 elections, this time defeating incumbent Bono Azanifa in the Henganofi open constituency by just six votes after preferences were counted. After becoming an MHA, he remained a local government councillor, and voted with the United Party in the House.

Kimi was one of six people killed in road accident on the Highlands Highway in August 1973. His funeral in Ahabe was attended by over 2,000 people.
