= Oala Oala-Rarua =

Papua New Guinean educator, politician and diplomat

Assistant Minister – Treasury
- In office 1968–1972
- Preceded by: Zure Makili Zurecnuoc

Member of the House of Assembly
- In office 1968–1972
- Preceded by: Percy Chatterton
- Succeeded by: Josephine Abaijah
- Constituency: Central Regional

Personal details
- Born: 12 June 1934 Pari, Papua
- Died: 17 May 1980 (aged 45) Port Moresby, Papua New Guinea

Oala Oala-Rarua (12 June 1934 – 17 May 1980) was a Papua New Guinean educator, civil servant, trade unionist, politician and diplomat. He served as a member of the House of Assembly and Assistant Minister for the Treasury between 1968 and 1972, later becoming the first Lord Mayor of Port Moresby and High Commissioner to Australia.

== Biography ==
Oala-Rarua was born in Pari in June 1934, the son of Asi (née Daroa) and Oala Oala-Rarua. He was educated at local schools, before training to be a teacher at Sogeri. He initially worked at a teacher at the same school in Sogeri, before moving onto the Kwato missionary school in Milne Bay in 1955. In 1957 he was appointed headmaster of Kerepuni school, and later studied at the University of Papua New Guinea. In 1961 he unsuccessfully contested elections to the Legislative Council. In 1962 he moved to Port Moresby to become an assistant to Assistant Administrator John Thomson Gunther. He joined the Welder's Club of Port Moresby, and was elected president of the Port Moresby Workers' Association the same year, a role he held until 1965. He also became a member of the territory's Council of Girl Guides Association.

In 1964 he contested the elections to the House of Assembly in the Moresby constituency, losing to Eriko Rarupu. The following year he founded the United National Party, after which he resigned from the civil service. In 1967 he was involved in the establishment of the Pangu Party and was elected to the House from the Central Provincial constituency in the 1968 elections. Following the elections, he was appointed Assistant Minister for the Treasury. In 1971 he was a candidate to become Secretary-General of the South Pacific Commission. However, after a tie in the first round of voting, he withdrew from the contest, allowing Fred Betham to win.

Oala-Rarua did not run for re-election in 1972 after being appointed to the Public Services Conciliation and Arbitration Tribunal. He had been elected president of Port Moresby local council in 1971, and became its first Lord Mayor when it was granted city status later in 1972. In 1974 he was appointed High Commissioner to Australia, After resigning from the role in late 1976, he unsuccessfully ran in the Moresby South constituency in the 1977 elections. He subsequently went into business.

He died in Port Moresby General Hospital in May 1980 after suffering a stroke, survived by his wife and five children.
