= John Keith McCarthy =

Australian public servant

John Keith McCarthy CBE

Director of Native Affairs
- In office 1960–1967

Official Member of the House of Assembly
- In office 1964–1967
- Succeeded by: Tom Ellis

Acting Administrator of Nauru
- In office 1957
- Preceded by: Reginald Leydin
- Succeeded by: Reginald Leydin

Official Member of the Legislative Council
- In office 1951–1964

Personal details
- Born: 20 January 1905; Melbourne, Australia
- Died: 29 October 1976 (aged 71); Melbourne, Australia

John Keith McCarthy CBE (20 January 1905 – 29 October 1976) was an Australian public servant in the Territory of Papua and New Guinea. He rose to become Director of Agriculture, also serving as a member of the Legislative Council and House of Assembly. In Papua New Guinea, he was known as 'Papa Bilong Ol' (Everybody's Father).

== Biography ==
McCarthy was born in the Melbourne suburb of St Kilda in 1905 to Mary (née Gibbs) and Thomas McCarthy. His father was an immigrant from Ireland and worked as a warehouseman. He was educated at Christian Brothers College, after which he was a jackaroo in New South Wales, before returning to Melbourne to work at Mark Foy's. He then went to Queensland, where he worked as a cane cutter.

In 1927 McCarthy moved to the Territory of New Guinea to become a patrol officer. He returned to Australia in 1929 to complete a course at the University of Sydney. In 1933 his patrol group was attacked and he was in hospital for several weeks recovering from arrow wounds. He married Jean Bilby at All Saints Church in St Kilda East in April 1937.

At the start of World War II McCarthy was an Assistant District Officer at Talasea. He helped evacuate civilians from Rabaul after the Japanese attack, for which he was awarded an MBE. He commanded local coastwatchers and the ANGAU scouts and became Military Resident Commissioner of Sarawak. Following the war he was appointed a District Officer, before being promoted to District Commissioner of Madang in 1949. He later held the same role in Rabaul.

In 1951 he was appointed to the Territory's Legislative Council as one of the official members. In 1955 he became executive officer of the Department of the Administrator, and was briefly Acting Administrator of Nauru in 1957. In 1960 he was appointed Director of Native Affairs, and in 1963 he published a memoir Patrol into Yesterday. Following the 1964 elections, he became an official member of the new House of Assembly, also serving as its Deputy Speaker. He awarded a CBE in the 1965 Birthday Honours.

McCarthy retired from the civil service in 1967. He contested the Moresby Open seat in the 1968 elections, losing to Percy Chatterton. He was a cartoonist for the Papua New Guinea Post-Courier, before returning to Melbourne in 1971, where he died in 1976 at the age of 71. His widow Jean donated his papers to the National Library of Australia. This collection included private diaries covering 1927-1971, correspondence, reports, maps, seminar papers, manuscripts, photographs and McCarthy's original cartoons.
