= Nicholas Brokam =

Papua New Guinean politician

Under-Secretary for Economic Affairs
- In office 1964

Under-Secretary for Information and Extension Services
- In office 1964–1968

Member of the House of Assembly
- In office 1964–1968

Member of the Legislative Council
- In office 1961–1964
- Constituency: New Guinea Islands (Indigenous)

Personal details
- Born: c. 1934; Lokon, Territory of New Guinea

Nicholas Brokam (born c. 1934) was a Papua New Guinean politician. He was a member of the Legislative Council and House of Assembly between 1961 and 1968, also serving as Under-Secretary for Economic Affairs and Information and Extension Services.

== Biography ==
Brokam was born in the village of Lokon in New Ireland. He attended Catholic mission schools and became a missionary teacher. He later worked as a storeman for a co-operative, before becoming a farmer.

He was a mission school teacher and co-operative storeman before becoming a farmer by the early 1960s.

Brokam was elected to the Legislative Council of Papua and New Guinea from the New Guinea Islands constituency in the 1961 elections. His election was viewed a surprise as he was not thought to be well-known, though he was said to have campaigned effectively at the Electoral Conference and had strong support from the local Catholic priest.

In the 1964 elections for the new House of Assembly, he was re-elected in the New Ireland constituency. Following the elections he was appointed Under-Secretary for Economic Affairs and Information. In December 1964 he was moved to become Under-Secretary for Information and Extension Services after the previous incumbent John Guise was elected Leader of Elected Members.

Brokam joined the Pangu Party at its establishment in 1967. He did not contest the 1968 elections.
