= 1967 Henganofi by-election =

A by-election for Henganofi constituency was held in the Territory of Papua and New Guinea on 15 July 1967, following the death of incumbent MHA Ugi Biritu. The result was a victory for Bono Azanifa, the runner-up to Biritu in the 1964 elections.

== Background ==
Henganofi constituency consisted of two main sections, one part of Henganofi District (containing around 45% of the registered voters) and one part of Lufa District (containing 55% of the electorate).

In the 1964 elections, the constituency was contested by five candidates; four from Lufa District and one from Henganofi District. Voter turnout (86%) was the highest in the country, and voters displayed what was described as the 'probably the most sophisticated use of in the Territory of the preferential system.' Although all but one of the candidates came from the Lufa District, voters in Lufa awarded almost all their preference votes to other candidates from the district. This meant that although the Henganofi candidate Bono Azanifa received by far the most first preference votes, he received only 271 preference votes from the 18,206 voters, allowing Lufa candidate Ugi Biritu to be elected on the fourth count despite receiving fewer than half the first preference votes of Azanifa.

1964 election result
Candidate	Votes by count				
Candidate	First	Second	Third	Fourth	Final
Bono Azanifa	8,028	12	35	224	8,299
Ugi Biritu	3,925	667	1,362	3,274	9,228
Pupuna Aruno	3,708	73	41	–	3,822
Posi Latara'oi	1,758	12	–	–	1,770
Forapi Maunori	787	–	–	–	787
No preference	–	23	334	324	681
Source: Wolfers

== Campaign ==
Seven candidates contested the elections; five from Lufa District and two from Henganofi District.

- Dogeba (Moses) Aigoba (Lufa District), relative of Biritu
- Atiheme Kimi (Henganofi District), President of Kafe Local Government Council, interpreter
- Pupnda Aruno (Lufa District)
- Bono Azanifa (Henganofi District), an assistant magistrate, member of the coffee board, former village headman and supporter of the Australian administration
- Wanumei Dimigura; from Lufa District, relative of Biritu
- Sunavi Otiyo (Lufa District)
- Lovana (James) Yaneipa (Lufa District)

Azanifa was the only candidate to campaign widely, although he did not travel to Lufa District.

== Results ==
Enthusiastic voters camped overnight outside polling stations and the vast majority of voters were cast before lunch. As many voters were illiterate, polling officials used the 'whispering ballot', where voters whispered their preferred candidates to the poll clerk.

As in 1964, there was significant preference transfers between candidates from the same district. Henganofi candidate Atiheme Kimi was eliminated in the first count, with 408 of his second preferences going to fellow Henganofi candidate Azanifa and only 12 to the four Lufa candidates. Despite only receiving 143 preference voters from Lufa candidates, Azanifa held on to his lead after most of the votes in the sixth count did not indicate a preference.

1964 election result
Candidate	Votes by count						
Candidate	First	Second	Third	Fourth	Fifth	Sixth	Final
Bono Azanifa	5,954	408	15	7	27	94	6,505
Pupuna Aruno	3,565	2	101	798	763	748	5,977
Wanumei Dimigura	2,375	1	124	161	837	–	3,498
Lovana Yaneipa	1,416	0	634	141	–	–	2,191
Dogeba Aigoba	1,373	1	19	–	–	–	1,393
Sunavi Otiyo	1,121	8	–	–	–	–	1,129
Atiheme Kimi	770	–	–	–	–	–	770
No preference	–	350	236	286	564	2,656	4,092
Source: Wolfers
