= PNG Country Party =

- Leader: Chris Haiveta
- President: Nelson Duabane
- Secretary: Rose Kepo
- Founder: Sinake Giregire
- Founded: March 1974
- Ideology: Rural development Agrarianism; Conservatism; Republicanism
- Political position: Centre-right
- National Parliament: 2 / 111

The Papua New Guinea Country Party is a political party in Papua New Guinea. It was founded in 1974.

== History ==
The party was founded by Sinake Giregire in March 1974 in advance of Papua New Guinean independence, drawing members largely from the United Party. The party's policy was largely based on agricultural, resource and other economic development. The conservative Australian Country Party reportedly agreed to provide assistance to the new party.

The Country Party was involved in the Nationalist Pressure Group in debates surrounding the formation of the Constitution of Papua New Guinea. The party supported the country becoming a republic rather than a monarchy upon independence, unsuccessfully moving for the draft constitution to be amended to that effect prior to its adoption in 1975. Giregire was defeated by John Guise in a bid to become the first Governor-General of Papua New Guinea in 1975, but the party successfully nominated Tore Lokoloko as the second Governor-General in 1977. Giregire lost his seat at the 1977 election.

Giregire revived the party for the 2002 election after years of inactivity, with ex-politicians Albert Mokai, Mackenzie Dauge, James Ibras and Bionte Heruo as regional co-ordinators. Giregire described the party's ideology as conservative but "more aggressive in addressing basic fundamentals of the society", specifically targeting the rural population. Former MP Roy Buaki Singeri and rugby star Dekot Koki were also among the party's candidates. Giregire was defeated, finishing third in his seat. Kompiam-Ambium candidate Dickson Maki was the only one to be elected, but declared himself an independent before joining the People's Action Party only days after his election.

It was relaunched again in October 2006 when MP Jamie Maxtone-Graham, formerly from the People's Progress Party, crossed to the Country Party and accepted the leadership with the support of Giregire. Maxtone-Graham was re-elected for the Country Party in the 2007 election and was joined by Jim Nomane, who won in Chuave Open. Maxtone-Graham and Nomane both crossed to other parties during that term, and Giregire died in January 2012. The party briefly regained a parliamentary seat when Minister for Environment and Conservation Thompson Harokaqveh crossed to the party and assumed the leadership in April 2012. Harokaqveh lost his own seat at the 2012 election, but two new MPs were elected at the election: Jeffery Kuave (Lufa Open) and Richard Mendani (Kerema Open). Both MPs defected to the People's National Congress in May 2013.

The party did not have parliamentary representation between 2013 and 2017, but party president Nelson Duwabane remained politically active during that time, having been outspoken about legal issues surrounding defecting MPs.

== Electoral results ==
The party contested the 2017 election, and as of May 2019 has 2 seats in the National Parliament.
