= 1966 Kaindi by-election =

Election in The Territory of Papua and New Guinea

A by-election for Kaindi constituency was held in the Territory of Papua and New Guinea between 16 July and 15 August 1966.

== Background ==
In the 1964 general election, the Kaindi seat had been contested by nine candidates. Bill Bloomfield, having run a tactical campaign to earn voters' second preferences, was elected on the eighth count. However, Bloomfield died in February 1966, becoming the first Papua New Guinean politician to die in office.

== Candidates ==
Five candidates registered to contest the election:

- Anani-Maniau, a village headman in the Buang area who had finished third in the 1964 elections
- Kopopanga, an interpreter from Menyamya
- Manasseh, a farmer from Sikong
- Omas-Genora, a gold miner from Wau, founder of the Native Miners' Welfare Association and protege of former MP Bloomfield
- Tony Voutas, an Australian former patrol officer who had recently resigned from the service to live amongst the indigenous population

Pacific Islands Monthly reported that the election was expected to be a contest between Omas-Genora and Voutas.

90 polling stations were set up for the by-election, overseen by eight teams of electoral officials. A total of 28,588 voters were registered.

== Results ==
Voutas was elected on first preference votes, receiving 12,333 votes. Voter turnout was around 70%.
