= Pita Tamindei =

Papua New Guinean politician

Member of the House of Assembly
- In office 1964–1968
- Succeeded by: Pita Lus
- Constituency: Maprik

Personal details
- Born: c. 1918 Loneim, New Guinea
- Died: June 1968

Pita Tamindei (c. 1918 – June 1968) was a Papua New Guinean politician. He served as a member of the House of Assembly between 1964 and 1968.

== Biography ==
Tamindei was born around 1918 in Loneim, a village near Maprik. He did not receive a formal education and became a coconut and coffee farmer and trader. He was one of the early adopters of rice growing in the Sepik area, as well as trying gold mining. He was also involved in the Mitpin Rural Progress Society.

Prior to entering politics, he had served as a luluai (village headman). He became the first president of Maprik Local Government Council in 1958, serving until 1960. He was then vice-president from 1961 until 1963, before briefly serving as president again in 1964. In the first general elections under universal suffrage in 1964, he successfully contested the Maprik seat, becoming a member of the new House of Assembly. He ran for re-election in the February–March 1968 elections, but was heavily defeated by Pita Lus.

Tamindei died in June 1968, aged around 50. He was married with three children.
