= Makain Mo =

Papua New Guinean chief and politician (1920–1972)

Member of the House of Assembly
- In office 1964–1968
- Constituency: Lumi

Personal details
- Born: c. 1920 Lumi, Territory of New Guinea
- Died: 1972

Makain Mo (c. 1920 – 1972) was a Papua New Guinean chief and politician. He served as a member of the House of Assembly between 1964 and 1968.

== Biography ==
Born in Lumi, Mo became chief of the Lumi people. Married with two children, he had a coffee plantation, raised cattle and organised gold mining. With the assistance of a local Catholic mission, he also opened a store.

Entering politics, Mo became president of Wapei-Lumi Local Government Council. He contested the Lumi seat in the 1964 elections and was elected to the House of Assembly. Following boundary adjustments, he ran in the West Sepik constituency in the 1968 elections, but was defeated by Brere Awol. In the February–March 1972 elections he contested the Wapei Nuku constituency, but lost to Yakob Talis.

Mo died later in 1972.
