= Melanesian Independence Front =

Papua New Guinea political party, 1968–1969

- Abbreviation: MIF
- Leader: Vin ToBaining
- Founded: October 17, 1968
- Dissolved: 1969
- Headquarters: Rabaul
- Ideology: Islands Region Independence; Federalization of Papua New Guinea

The Melanesian Independence Front initially known as the Melanesian Independence Party, was a political party in Papua New Guinea advocating for Independence of the Islands Region as Melanesia.

== History ==
In the 1968 New Guinean elections, Vin ToBaining was defeated by Oscar Tammur in the Kokopo Open constituency and left the Pangu Party. A few months later, at a public meeting held near Rabaul on October 16th, 1968, he was elected as President of the Melanesian Independence Party, who pledged to work constitutionally towards independence for New Guinea islands. The Front was also active in Bougainville.

The Front has adopted the frangipani as emblem to represent New Britain, New Ireland, Bougainville, the Admiralty Islands, and other islands within the region. It submitted candidates for all of thirteen islands' electorates to the House of Assembly, and called for an independence referendum. It envisioned the creation of a new country called Melanesia which was to become a member of the United Nations, and the British Commonwealth with the governor based in Rabaul.

The party was opposed by The United Niugini Political Party and the United Islands Progress Society (later merged into the Islands Political Society), which reaffirmed the necessity of the Territory's unity, and by the Anglican Church of Australia. By 1969, the Party was dissolved.
