= Kaura Duba =

Papua New Guinean Politician

Member of the House of Assembly
- In office 1968–1969
- Preceded by: Seat created
- Succeeded by: Thomas Kavali
- Constituency: Jimi

Personal details
- Died: 26 February 1969

Kaura Duba (died 26 February 1969) was a Papua New Guinean politician. He served as a member of the House of Assembly from 1968 until his death the following year.

== Biography ==
Married with one child, Duba worked as an interpreter and had a coffee farm. He was elected to the council of Jimi Rural LLG.

Duba contested the Jimi open constituency in the February– March 1968 elections, and was elected to the House of Assembly. However, he died in February the following year.

== See also ==
- List of members of the Papua New Guinean Parliament who died in office
