= Evennett =

Evennett is a surname. Notable people with the surname include:

- David Evennett (1949–2026), British politician
- Norman Evennett (1929–1970), Papua New Guinean politician
