= Vin ToBaining =

Papua New Guinea politician

Member of the Legislative Council of Papua and New Guinea
- In office 1961–1963

Personal details
- Born: East New Britain Province, Papua New Guinea
- Died: 2 April 1995

Vin ToBaining OBE MBE (died 1995) was one of the first six elected indigenous members of the colonial-era Legislative Council of Papua and New Guinea, between 1961 and 1963. Subsequently, he was involved in the formation of the Pangu Party in 1967, which went on to form the government of Papua New Guinea (PNG) when the country became independent in 1975.

== Early life ==
Vin ToBaining was a Tolai from what is now the East New Britain Province of PNG. He came from a farming family. His date of birth is unknown but he is known to have been over 80 when he died.

== Political involvement ==
ToBaining was a strong supporter of local-level government. He was elected as president of the Vunamami local government council in 1951 and subsequently of the Gazelle local government council. He was instrumental in the formation of the Tolai Cocoa Project in the 1950s, designed to improve the quality of cocoa-processing facilities for local farmers on the Gazelle Peninsula. When the Australian administration of the Territory of Papua and New Guinea decided that the Legislative Council of Papua and New Guinea should have six elected Papua New Guinean members in the 1961 elections, ToBaining was elected to represent New Britain, as a member of the United Progress Party. In 1961, he was chosen to be a member of the Australian delegation to the United Nations General Assembly.

In 1964, the Territory of Papua and New Guinea introduced a new 64-member House of Assembly, which had 54 elected members. In the 1964 election ToBaining failed to be elected in the East New Britain constituency, being soundly defeated by Koriam Urekit. In 1967, nine members of the House of Assembly came together to form the Pangu Party, together with others that included Michael Somare, the future prime minister of an independent Papua New Guinea, and ToBaining, who became one of its four rotating chairmen. In the 1968 elections ToBaining was again defeated, this time by Oscar Tammur. Subsequently, he left the Pangu Party and became president of the newly formed Melanesian Independence Front, which had a policy of achieving independence for the islands of the Territory of Papua and New Guinea, specifically New Britain, New Ireland, Bouganville, and the Admiralty Islands.

== Death ==
ToBaining died on 2 April 1995 in his home village in East New Britain.
