= William Bloomfield =

William or Bill Bloomfield may refer to:

- William Bloomfield (VC) (1873–1954), South African recipient of the Victoria Cross
- William Bloomfield (architect) (1885–1969), New Zealand architect
- Bill Bloomfield (1912–1966), Papua New Guinean politician

== See also ==
- William Bloomfield Douglas (1822–1906), British naval officer and public servant
- William Blomfield (1866–1938), New Zealand politician
- William Broomfield (1922–2019), American politician
