= Kondom Agaundo, M.L.C. =

- Directed by: R. Maslyn Williams
- Produced by: Lee Robinson
- Starring: Kondom Agaundo; John West; R. Maslyn Williams
- Narrated by: Maslyn Williams
- Release date: 1962
- Running time: 27 mins
- Country: Australia
- Language: English

Kondom Agaundo, M.L.C. is a 1962 Australian documentary about indigenous leader Kondom Agaundo, from the Central Highlands of Papua New Guinea, who became a member of the Legislative Council with no formal education.
