= Kondom Agaundo =

(c.1917–1966) tribal leader and politician

Member of the Legislative Council
- In office 1961–1964
- Constituency: Highlands

Personal details
- Born: c. 1917 Wandi, Territory of New Guinea
- Died: 28 August 1966 Daulo Pass, Papua and New Guinea

Kondom Agaundo (c. 1917 – 28 August 1966) was a Papua New Guinean tribal leader and politician. He served as a member of the Legislative Council between 1961 and 1964.

== Biography ==
Agaundo was born in Wandi, a village near Kundiawa, around 1917. His father was a war leader, but he was orphaned as a child. He subsequently grew up in Koglai and developed a close relationship with the Australian authorities, carrying milk from the Catholic mission at Mingende to the government compound at Kundiawa. In the 1940s he became luluai of his tribe. Encouraged by Australian officials, he built the first house in the area in 1959, as well as building a community hall and overseeing the development of coffee farming. Despite being illiterate, when Waiye Rural LLG was formed in 1959, Agaundo became its first president.

He contested the Highlands seat in the 1961 elections, and was elected to the Legislative Council, where he demanded more development of the Highlands. A documentary, Kondom Agaundo, M.L.C., was made about him in 1962. In the first elections with universal suffrage in 1964 he contested the Chimbu seat, but finished third, losing to Waiye Siune. However, he continued as a member of the Eastern Highlands District Advisory Council, and became chairman of the Kundiawa Coffee Society, the largest co-operative society in the territory.

Aguando had at least eight wives. He was killed in a road accident on the Daulo Pass in the Eastern Highlands in August 1966, and was buried at Wandi. The headquarters of Chimbu Province were named after him in 1982, with a high school in Wandi named after him in 2012.
