= Yali (politician) =

Papua New Guinean coastwatcher and politician (1912–1975)

Yali Singina (1912 – 26 September 1975) was a Papua New Guinean coastwatcher, local government councillor, cult leader, police officer, political activist, prisoner and soldier. Yali was born near Sor village in the Madang District in then-German New Guinea and died in the same place, by the end of his life in the independent country of Papua New Guinea.

== Early life ==
After 1945, the Australian Administration of Papua New Guinea realised that it had to combat the antagonism of the native people towards the colonial power and Europeans in general. To this end, it promoted native leaders who would explain to their people the advantages of working with the Administration. The most prominent of these became Yali, of the Rai Coast, "born in the Ngaing bush area of Sor, a member of the Walaliang patriclan and the Tabinung matriclan, about 1912".

Yali's father had been an important community leader, but he himself was not trained in the traditional skills of his forefathers and left home at a young age to work for Europeans. In 1928 Yali went to Wau as an indentured labourer and served as a waiter in a hotel.

In 1929 he met Tagarab of Milguk, who had been at the anti-colonialist Rabaul Strike in 1928 and would go on to lead a cargo cult between 1942 and 1944, when he was shot by the retreating Imperial Japanese Army.

Yali returned to the Rai Coast in 1931 to become Tultul of Sor (second in command to the Luluai, the village headman). After his wife died in late 1936 or early 1937, he left again to join the police force at the Rabaul Police Training Academy. Yali was stationed at Lae at the outbreak of war in 1939. During these years he witnessed and participated in acts of police brutality and rape against prisoners. He also heard much cargo talk and dissatisfaction with the material divide between them and their colonial employers.

== Administration service in World War II ==
In 1941 he was sent with Tagarab to arrest the leaders of the Kukuaik Cargo Cult on Karkar Island. One of the men arrested prophesied the bombing of Madang and the arrival of a Japanese army with cargo for the people. When the bombing took place soon afterwards, Yali was impressed by the man's visionary abilities.

Yali remained loyal to the Australian Administration throughout the war, and saw action against the Japanese army in 1942. He was promoted to Sergeant of Police and sent for six months training in Queensland, Australia. The differences between Australian and Papuan society made a big impression on Yali – the wide roads, vast agricultural production and emphasis on hygiene and cleanliness impressed him, even making him feel ashamed for the deficiencies of his own culture and society.

In 1944, Yali went with a coast-watching party to Hollandia, but the landing party was ambushed by the Japanese and Yali escaped with Sgt. Buka, a Manus native, into the jungle. Yali managed to walk all the way to Aitape with the use of a compass and a rifle with 50 rounds. Sgt. Buka became ill and was lost in the jungle. The total distance was 120 miles and took Yali 3 months to walk.

Yali's experiences during the war reinforced his belief in the efficacy of the traditional pagan religious system. "Yali and Buka found a crocodile. Buka at once wanted to shoot it for food. Yali, however, remarked that it was odd that there should be a crocodile in the bush with no river nearby. It was probably, he said, a local deity and they had better respect it as such." Buka eventually persuaded Yali to shoot it and, Yali claimed, it became dark and wild animals surrounded them. They threw the meat away and Buka, believing that the local gods would punish him for shooting the crocodile, became very ill. Yali and Buka became separated and Buka was lost in the jungle.

In 1944–45, Yali was again drafted back to Brisbane, seeing a zoo and other aspects of Western society. However, because he was illiterate and could not speak English well, he could not discuss what he saw and did not develop a complex or complete understanding of how Western society worked, according to Lawrence. Because of his faith in the integrity of Europeans he knew, he took at face value Australian promises of economic assistance in reward for helping the Allies. He also visited the Queensland Museum where he saw ethnographic exhibits of old Papuan pagan religious relics. He started to consider why Europeans obviously valued these items, and "he adopted a flexible attitude towards Christianity and paganism: each had a legitimate place in the scheme of things he saw".

== After the war ==
Yali now became informally employed by the Administration, to counter the anti-colonial belief that Europeans were withholding the secret to their material wealth from the native people. He began to give speeches to villages along the Rai Coast, urging them to collaborate with the Administration in exchange for promises of economic assistance after the war. But he made these promises in religiously ambiguous terms, which people took to mean that Yali had special cargo knowledge, and rumours began to spread that he was a spirit of the dead returned to bring cargo to the people.

Yali proceeded to put in place, over the next few years, an administrative system with himself as leader with loosely associated 'boss boys' representing him in different villages. He aimed to reorganise his society along Western lines, with people living in larger villages in houses along straight roads and with more attention paid to cleanliness and tidiness. But his Rehabilitation Scheme, as it was called, began to attract quasi-Christian cargo enthusiasts, who started to spread cargo propaganda in Yali's name. Yali realised that his authority depended on being the leader of a religious movement and did nothing to disillusion people to his rumoured supernatural powers, nor did he denounce his acclamation as King of Cargo.

As part of the Rehabilitation Scheme, Yali attempted to stimulate trade and agricultural production in Madang, but with little success.

In mid-1947, Yali and other native leaders were summoned to Port Moresby for "a period of indoctrination" by the Administration. They were concerned with his activities and wanted to bring him back in line. Yet Yali believed that he was about to be rewarded for his work and support with a promotion and economic assistance. Speculation about the trip led to cargo activity flourishing across the Rai Coast. Yali was away for 4 months, suffering travel and logistical problems, and was then denied the free hand-out he expected to receive from the administration. He attended a meeting of a local council in Port Moresby where the Papuans asked the local officials when they would get electricity in their village. They were told that they would get it as soon as they could afford to pay for it, which dismayed the people who had believed that electricity was a service free of charge.

== Cargo cultism ==
Yali was appointed to the newly invented office of Foreman Overseer and his questions about the Administration's attitude to traditional religious practices were clarified. Yali was also encouraged to draft a set of 'laws' for native society. He took this as confirmation of his legal authority over the missions, whom he saw as interfering, and decided to go back to Madang and lead a pagan revival, again with the propaganda aim of 'opening the road to cargo'. Once again, Lawrence states, this shows that, despite his exposure to Western society, he retained the animist worldview in which religion was a 'technology', through which men gained good harvests and maintained good social relationships.

Around this time, Yali discovered that many Europeans were ambivalent towards Christianity and was told about the theory of evolution. He saw this as proof that the missions had been dishonest and now believed that some Europeans claimed totemic descent from Adam and Eve, while others claimed the monkey as their ancestor, with still others claiming other animals. This explained his questions about why Europeans kept pets and built zoos. He now persuaded people to abandon Christianity and return to the worship of traditional deities. This also allowed Yali to save face, having returned from Port Moresby without the expected cargo.

Yali then became involved in a new cult elaborated by a new leader called Gurek. They jointly created a new movement on the Rai coast that Lawrence designates the Fifth Cargo Belief. This cult combined with Yali's existing political organisation and spread throughout Southern Madang in 1948. "As the cult snowballed, missionaries were threatened with violence, non-believers were gaoled, and illegal taxes were levied."

However, this Fifth Cargo Belief was resisted or rejected by many groups in Madang – both the coastal Sengam and the Bagasin Area peoples to the north largely stayed aloof from all cargo activity.

During 1948–49, Yali attempted to consolidate and spread his power-base. Using the 'laws' he had written in Port Moresby, Yali tried to usurp the Administration's existing structure in legal, political and organisational matters in Madang. He got permission from the Administration authorities to go on 'patrols' of areas which remained outside of his sphere of influence. He intended to break the power of the Christian missions over these areas.

On his first patrol, Yali visited some Lutheran evangelists who opposed him and had them humiliated and slapped in the face by his policemen while the whole village watched. On the third patrol in January 1949 more strong-arm tactics were used, and this time some women were raped by members of Yali's party, as well as Administration officials travelling with them. In 1948 there was a further instance where women were raped by Yali's officials while detained under suspicion of a criminal offence.

== Imprisonment and later life ==
By the end of 1948, Yali's power was declining. The District Officer reprimanded him after much pressure from the missionaries, while his followers were also losing faith that the pagan ritual would bring them cargo. Gurek, Yali's chief theologian, had abandoned him to return to his village.

It was a further incident in early 1948 which led to Yali's eventual imprisonment. His former secretary, Kasan, had been accused of adultery and taken to Yali, who was now seen as the chief legal authority in Madang. While the accused parties and their go-betweens were imprisoned at Yabalol, Yali tried to seduce one of the female prisoners, who rejected his advances. The girl was later raped by one of Yali's policemen. The incident was later reported to the Lutheran mission by Kasan. The mission then paid to publish a newspaper report accusing Yali of responsibility for this and other offences. Yali denied everything to the Madang District Officer, but when he tried to sue for libel the case was quickly dropped when the mission produced their evidence. An official investigation was launched into Yali's activities and he was eventually sentenced to six and a half years for deprivation of liberty and incitement to rape, but not for any cargo activity.

"After his release from jail, Yali decided that the secret of the cargo lay in the Papua New Guinea House of Assembly. He tried to get elected to the Madang council but was defeated. As an old man he became the object of great veneration. 'Flower girls' visited him once a year and brought away his semen in bottles. People continued to give him gifts, and he collected a fee for baptising Christians who wanted to wash away the sins of Christianity and return to paganism. Yali's last prophecy was that New Guinea would achieve independence on 1 August 1969." He was proven correct in this prophecy, albeit six years later than the date he had said.

In 1970, Yali left a profound impression in the American biologist Jared Diamond, who was then living in Papua New Guinea as a birdwatcher. Yali's question on why whites had more cargo than Melanesians would eventually prompt Diamond to publish Guns, Germs and Steel.

Yali died on 26 September 1975 at Sor, living just long enough to witness the declaration of Papua New Guinean independence from Australia.

Following in his father's footsteps, James Yali became a prominent political leader in Madang who was also believed by many to be a powerful sorcerer, only to be jailed for raping his sister-in-law in 2006. He is currently on parole, though may be in trouble again for allegedly threatening a human rights lawyer.
