= Norman Evennett =

Member of the House of Assembly
- In office 1968–1970
- Succeeded by: Tim Ward
- Constituency: Esa'ala

Personal details
- Born: 29 June 1929 Samarai, Papua
- Died: 12 June 1970 (aged 40) Samarai, Papua and New Guinea

Norman Frederick Evennett (29 June 1929 – 12 June 1970) was a Papua New Guinean politician. He served as a member of the House of Assembly from 1968 until his death two years later.

== Biography ==
Evennett was born in Samarai in the Territory of Papua in 1929. He attended Townsville State School and All Souls School in Charters Towers, before returning to Papua, where he became a businessman and plantation owner.

In the 1968 general elections, Evennett contested the Esa'ala Open constituency under the Tok Pisin name "Nomani". He was elected to the House of Assembly on the first count after receiving more than half of all votes cast.

He died in Samarai hospital in June 1970, survived by his wife and children.

== See also ==
- List of members of the Papua New Guinean Parliament who died in office
