= Jeffery Kuave =

Jeffery Kuave (born 1961) is a Papua New Guinean politician. He has been a member of the National Parliament of Papua New Guinea since 2012, representing the electorate of Lufa Open for the PNG Country Party (2012–2013) and People's National Congress (2013–present).

Kuave was educated at Marima Primary School in Chimbu Province, and was a self-taught mechanic before entering politics. He was a member of the Unavi Local Level Government from 1992 to 1986 and a member of the Eastern Highlands Provincial Assembly for the Unavi constituency from 1986 to 1991. He was elected to the National Parliament for the PNG Country Party at the 2012 election. Although he was initially reported to have signed the government coalition accord on behalf of the Country Party, they subsequently went into opposition, and he served as Shadow Minister for Community Development, Sports and Pacific Games under opposition leader Belden Namah. In May 2013, Kuave defected to the governing People's National Congress, causing some controversy due to not having been released by the Country Party. Kuave serves as chairman of the Privileges Permanent Committee, chairman of the Industry and Industrial Relations Referral Committee and a member of the Plans and Estimates Permanent Committee.

National Parliament of Papua New Guinea
Preceded by Yawa Silupa	Member for Lufa Open; 2012–present	Incumbent
