= Horace Niall =

Australian military officer (1904–1994)

Speaker of the National Parliament of Papua New Guinea
- In office 8 June 1964 – 3 June 1968
- Preceded by: Position established
- Succeeded by: John Guise

Personal details
- Born: 4 October 1904; Coolah, New South Wales, Australia
- Died: 1 May 1994 (aged 89)
- Education: University of Sydney

Sir Horace Lionel Richard Niall (4 October 1904 – 1 May 1994) was an Australian military officer and government official who served in Papua New Guinea. He was the first Speaker of the National Parliament of Papua New Guinea, serving from 1964 to 1968.

== Biography ==
Niall was born on 4 October 1904 in Coolah, New South Wales. He attended Mudgee High School and later the University of Sydney. He later joined the Australian military with the rank of cadet patrol officer, and in May 1927, he arrived in Rabaul, Territory of Papua, as a member of the Australian administration of the territory. He was promoted to the rank of patrol officer in 1930, the same year he married.

According to The Sydney Morning Herald, much of Niall's work was "in trudging over jungle-clad peaks, finding unknown tribes and filling in hitherto blank spaces on maps." He was later moved from Rabaul to Talasea, where he continued patrolling. He received a promotion to assistant district officer in 1935 and to district officer in 1941. According to the Papua New Guinea Post-Courier, he "spent two-thirds of his time in the bush", and at one point went four months without seeing a white man. He was also active in law enforcement, recalling being "in the bush for nine days" shortly after his arrival, in an attempt to catch a few criminals who had escaped. He worked with local police in capturing killers from Papuan tribes. Once, after arresting a group of five murderers, he served as the magistrate but was later ordered to defend them at the Supreme Court, then, when they were convicted, served as their executioner and the coroner.

Niall patrolled all areas of Papua New Guinea except for Bougainville prior to World War II. A major, he was stationed at Wau during the war, and although his home was blown up, he escaped capture by the Japanese. He was the only district officer in the territory during the war. During this time, he mostly lived in the bush, but eventually Papua New Guinea was recaptured from the Japanese; afterwards, he was named by the Australian government to rebuild the city of Lae. He mainly worked in the Morobe Province from 1940, except for a period from 1946 to 1949, when he worked in East Sepik Province. In 1949, he became the district commissioner for Morobe Province. Two years later, he became an inaugural member of the Legislative Council of Papua and New Guinea, serving until the legislature's abolition in 1963.

In 1964, Niall was elected unopposed to the new House of Assembly of Papua and New Guinea. He was the only candidate in the election who ran unopposed. After winning election, he was named the first Speaker of the House of Assembly. He served for four years in this role until his retirement in 1968 and was also the commissioner of the Papua and New Guinea Energy Commission. Afterwards, he worked as a director with local companies before departing Papua New Guinea in 1973, subsequently settling in Palm Beach, New South Wales. Niall was named a Member of the Most Excellent Order of the British Empire (MBE) in 1943 and a Commander of the Most Excellent Order of the British Empire (CBE) in 1958. He was knighted on the recommendation of the Papua New Guinean government during the 1974 Birthday Honours. He was married and had a daughter, and died on 1 May 1994, at the age of 89.
