= Papua New Guinean nationality law =

Papua New Guinean nationality law is regulated by the 1975 Constitution of Papua New Guinea, as amended; the Citizenship Act 1975, and its revisions; and international agreements entered into by the Papua New Guinean government. These laws determine who is, or is eligible to be, a national of Papua New Guinea. The legal means to acquire nationality, formal legal membership in a nation, differ from the domestic relationship of rights and obligations between a national and the nation, known as citizenship. Papua New Guinean nationality is typically obtained either on the principle of jus soli, i.e. by birth in Papua New Guinea or under the rules of jus sanguinis, i.e. by birth abroad to parents with Papua New Guinean nationality. It can be granted to persons who have lived in the country for a specific period of time, who have contributed to the country's development, or who have an affiliation to the country through naturalization.

== Acquiring Papua New Guinean nationality ==
Nationality in Papua New Guinea is acquired at birth or later in life by naturalization.

=== By birth ===
Birthright nationality applies to:

- Persons born in the territory to at least one parent who is Papua New Guinean;
- Persons born abroad to at least one parent who is Papua New Guinean;
- Persons born aboard a ship or aircraft registered in Papua New Guinea, or an unregistered vessel belonging to the government of Papua New Guinea; or
- Foundlings or children of unknown ancestry found in the territory of Papua New Guinea.

=== By naturalization ===
Regular naturalization in Papua New Guinea is acquired by submitting an application to the Minister with the responsibility for the administration of immigration. Applicants must provide evidence that they are of good character, have familiarity with the language and customs of Papua New Guinea, are self-supporting, and have resided within the territory for eight years. A Citizenship Advisory Committee makes the determination that the applicant has sufficient knowledge of civics and language. If the application is approved, the applicant must renounce other nationality, unless they are applying for dual nationality and take a Loyalty Oath. A special naturalization process for persons who have performed distinguished service to the public or nation is permitted for economic development or sporting achievement. Naturalization is also available to:

- Adoptees;
- The legal spouse of a Papua New Guinean who has resided in the territory for one of the past three years;
- Persons with at least one parent or grandparent who was, or would have been eligible to be except for death, a national of Papua New Guinea;
- Minor children of persons who obtain nationality through naturalization; or
- Former nationals who lost their nationality, including loss because of marriage to a foreign spouse, after five years of continuous residence in the territory.

== Loss of nationality ==
Papua New Guinean nationals may renounce their nationality provided they have legal majority and capacity and have obtained other nationality. In times of war, renunciation may not be allowed because of national security concerns. Denaturalisation may occur if a person obtained nationality through fraud, false representation, or concealment; if they have served a foreign state or military; if they have voted or traveled on a foreign passport; or if they have obtained multiple nationalities without having registered for dual nationality.

== Dual nationality ==
Since 2014, Papua New Guinea has allowed multiple nationality only if the secondary nationality is from a specific nation, such as Australia, Fiji, Germany, New Zealand, Samoa, the United Kingdom, the United States, or Vanuatu.

== Commonwealth citizenship ==
Papua New Guinean citizens are also Commonwealth citizens as well by default.

== History ==
=== Pre-colonial period (1526–1884) ===
Portions of the coast of the island that would become known as New Guinea were regarded as part of the Hindu thalassocratic Majapahit Empire, which had declined by 1516. In 1526, Jorge de Menezes, the Portuguese governor-elect of the Molucca Islands sailed to take up his post. Blown off course, he arrived at an island populated by the Papuan people and spent time in the port of Versija waiting for more favorable wind conditions to continue his journey. Two years later Álvaro de Saavedra encountered the Admiralty Islands off the northern coast of the Papua lands. Other explorers like António Galvão and Hernando de Grijalva sailed through the area in the 1530s. A detailed map, produced by Yñigo Ortiz de Retez of the northern coast of Papua and adjacent islands outlined his journey from the Moluccas to the islands in 1545. He claimed the land for the Spanish crown and bestowed upon it the name of New Guinea. Neglect of the area by Spain resulted in raids and trade by various Muslim rulers from the Moluccas, including Sultan Saifuddin of the Sultanate of Tidore, who made claim to sovereignty over New Guinea and the islands to its north in the latter part of the sixteenth century.

Despite these claims, Spanish sovereignty in New Guinea was confirmed by the Treaty of Münster, which ended the Thirty Years' War and Dutch War of Independence in 1648. In 1660, the Dutch and Moluccan sultanates, signed an agreement defining the territories each claimed, to prevent future disputes. In the agreement, the Sultan of Tidore laid claim to all of the islands of the Papuans. Three years later, the Sultan of Tidore aligned with the Dutch East Indies Company and the Spanish withdrew from the area, leaving New Guinea independent from outside rule. The 1660 agreement was renewed in 1667 and over the next decade, Tidorese authorities limited trade with New Guinea to permitted vessels. It was renewed again in 1689 when a new sultan ascended to rule Tidore. From 1703, British traders were operating in the territory hoping to break the Dutch monopoly on the spice trade. In 1779, Tidore became a vassal state supported by the Dutch East India Company, which went bankrupt in 1799. In 1816, the Dutch government took over the territories formerly managed by the East India Company, continuing the vassal relationship with the Sultanate of Tidore.

During the Napoleonic Wars, Britain took possession of all major Dutch colonies in the East Indies. At the end of the conflict, under terms of the Anglo-Dutch Treaty of 1814, Dutch possessions were restored, which included in Article 5, the claim of New Guinea for its vassal state. Because of continuing disputes, the Anglo-Dutch Treaty of 1824 was agreed upon, delineating obligations of the two empires and stipulations to regulate trade and commerce. The treaty acknowledged Dutch sovereignty in the western half of New Guinea, although the Dutch did not settle in the area until 1898. (Note: An 1872 agreement between the Sultan of Tidore and the Dutch government acknowledged the Dutch authority over both Tidore and any possessions it had. The Dutch retained sovereignty over Netherlands New Guinea from 1824 to 1962, when it became Western New Guinea and part of Indonesia.) From the 1870s missionaries and traders operated on the eastern side of the island and various of the Australian colonies sought annexation of the territory. The British government was unwilling to annex the area because of the cost of administration. In 1883, the Colony of Queensland attempted to annex the eastern half of the island as a strategic defence from German expansion. Queensland's action, prompted Germany to declare a protectorate over the northeastern part of New Guinea to protect its trade aspirations. German possession of the northeast, in turn caused a British response, making the southeastern part of New Guinea a Protectorate.

=== German and British protectorates (1884–1914) ===
Germany named its protectorate Kaiser-Wilhelmsland and established the German New Guinea Company to administer the colony in a manner similar to previous proprietary colonies or company-state entities operated by the Dutch and British East India Companies. Initially the territory included the northeastern portion of New Guinea and the Bismarck Archipelago, but was extended in 1886 to encompass the North Solomon Islands. Under the terms of the German Colonial Act of 1888, German colonies were not part of the federal union, but they were also not considered foreign. Thus, laws that were extended to the colonies sometimes treated residents as nationals and other times as foreigners. Native subjects in the colonies were not considered to be German citizens, but were allowed to naturalise. Naturalization required ten years residence in the territory and proof of self-employment. It was automatically bestowed upon all members of a family, meaning children and wives derived the nationality of the husband. In 1899, the Imperial Government took over administration of the territory. The Nationality Law of 1913 changed the basis for acquiring German nationality from domicile to patrilineality, but did not alter derivative nationality.

British New Guinea included the southeastern portion of New Guinea and was extended in 1888 to include the Louisiade Archipelago. At that time, the protectorate was formally recognised as a crown colony. In Britain, allegiance, in which subjects pledged to support a monarch, was the precursor to the modern concept of nationality. The Crown recognised from 1350 that all persons born within the territories of the British Empire were subjects. Those born outside the realm — except children of those serving in an official post abroad, children of the monarch, and children born on a British sailing vessel — were considered by common law to be foreigners. Marriage did not affect the status of a subject of the realm, but married women were subjugated to the authority of their husbands under coverture. Law was structured to maintain social hierarchies by regulating familial matters such as who could marry, legitimacy, and inheritance. Nationality laws passed by the British Parliament were extended only to the Kingdom of Great Britain, and later the United Kingdom of Great Britain and Ireland. Other than common law, there was no standard statutory law which applied for subjects throughout the realm, meaning different jurisdictions created their own legislation for local conditions, which often conflicted with the laws in other jurisdictions in the Empire. For example, in 1875, New South Wales followed the British Naturalization Act 1870 (33 & 34 Vict. c. 14), by denaturalising women who married aliens. Though similar legislation was not passed in the other Australian colonies, it became standard practice for women to lose their nationality upon marriage according to naturalisation records of widows seeking repatriation.

In 1902, after the Federation of Australia became Commonwealth of Australia, the authority for the colony passed from Britain to Australia. In 1905 Australia passed the Papua Act 1905, renaming the area as the Territory of Papua, officially taking over administration of its new territory in 1906. Though the concept of Australian nationality was debated during the constitutional deliberations, the "supranational concept of British nationality" prevailed and the constitution was silent on the issue. After federation, one of the first acts passed by the Australian parliament was the Immigration Restriction Act 1901, which formed the basis of the White Australia policy which imposed racial restrictions on immigration until 1973. While the policy prohibited males of various ethnicities who could not pass a literacy test, it allowed wives and children regardless of their ethnicity, even if they were illiterate, as long as the husband was an eligible immigrant. The Australian Naturalisation Act 1903 expressly prohibited native persons of Africa, Asia, or the Pacific Islands, except New Zealand, from being naturalised. In 1911, at the Imperial Conference a decision was made to draft a common nationality code for use across the empire. The British Nationality and Status of Aliens Act 1914 allowed local jurisdictions in the self-governing colonies to continue regulating nationality in their territories, but also established an imperial nationality scheme throughout the realm.

=== Australian period (1914–1975) ===
In 1914, during World War I, Australian military forces landed near Herbertshöhe and engaged with German resistance. Within three days, the Germans surrendered and Australia established a military administration over Kaiser-Wilhelmsland, which would remain in place for seven years. At the end of the war in 1919, the League of Nations established four class C Mandates in the Pacific for the former German colonies. Australia was assigned the Territory of New Guinea, which included the Bismark Archipelago and the adjoining islands. In 1920, the Australian parliament passed a bill to create the civil administration in the territory, which included provisions to abolish slavery, prevent forced labour, and control alcohol and firearms. Under British law, mandated territories were outside the Crown's dominions, meaning British nationality laws did not apply to natives, but only to British subjects born to British fathers who may have been domiciled in a mandated place. (Note: A commission was convened in 1946 to review nationality of the inhabitants in former German colonies. It concluded that inhabitants of "C"-type mandates did not acquire British nationality and if they had been German nationals under the terms of the 1913 Nationality law, they became stateless when Germany abandoned its territories. According to D. P. O'Connell, they were deemed to be "lacking nationality but enjoying an administrative status analogous to that of inhabitants of British protectorates".)

In 1920, the Australian parliament also enacted the provisions of the British Nationality Act, which had gone into effect in 1915. Interpretation of the uniform law was that changes to an individual country's laws were only allowed if all of the other British countries unanimously concurred. It required a married woman to derive her nationality from her spouse, meaning if he was British, she was also, and if he was foreign, so was she. It stipulated that upon loss of nationality of a husband, a wife could declare that she wished to remain British and provided that if a marriage had terminated, through death or divorce, a British-born national who had lost her status through marriage could re-acquire British nationality through naturalisation without meeting a residency requirement. The statute reiterated common law provisions for natural-born persons born within the realm on or after the effective date. By using the word person, the statute nullified legitimacy requirements for jus soli nationals, meaning illegitimate children could derive nationality maternally. For those born abroad on or after the effective date, legitimacy was still required, and could only be derived by a child from a British father (one generation), who was natural-born or naturalised. Naturalisations required five years' residence or service to the crown. Because of its status as part of the British Dominions, inhabitants of the Territory of Papua were subject to the provision of the uniform nationality law.

Amendments to the British Nationality Act were enacted in 1918, 1922, 1933 and 1943 changing derivative nationality by descent and modifying slightly provisions for women to lose their nationality upon marriage. The 1926 Imperial Conference, formally granted dominion status to Australia, Canada, the Irish Free State, Newfoundland, New Zealand, and the Union of South Africa, establishing the associated autonomous communities of equal status within the British Empire, which shared a common allegiance to the Crown. In 1931, the Statute of Westminster confirmed full legislative independence for the Dominions, creating the possibility for separate nationality in member states of the empire. After the World Conference on the Codification of International Law held in The Hague in 1930, discussion commenced throughout the empire as to whether laws should be modified to conform with the provisions to prevent statelessness in the Convention on Certain Questions Relating to the Conflict of Nationality Laws. Britain modified its laws to prevent women from becoming stateless in 1933, by allowing a married woman to retain her nationality if her husband's native country did not automatically give her his nationality. In 1935, Ireland drafted a statute, the Irish Nationality and Citizenship Act, which created a distinct nationality for Irish persons. In 1935 in New Zealand and in 1936 in Australia, legislation was passed to allow married women who might become aliens by marriage to retain their British nationality while residing in either country. The 1943 revision to the British Nationality Act allowed a child born abroad at any time to be a British national by descent if the Secretary of State agreed to register the birth.

At the end of World War II, in 1945, the United Nations replaced the League of Nations and the new organization reevaluated the trusteeship program. Mandates were replaced by Trust Territories to be overseen by a Trusteeship Council. New Guinea became a Trust Territory administered by Australia in 1946, and its inhabitants remained outside of British nationality law. That year, Canada passed a nationality law that would serve as a catalyst for change throughout Britain. The law redefined the order of nationality, stipulating that Canadians were nationals of Canada first, and only secondarily nationals of Britain, and eliminating derivative nationality for Canadian wives. Almost immediately New Zealand and Australia followed with amendments to their nationality statutes, granting women individual nationality. The Australian Nationality Act of 1946 allowed women to remain British subjects in Australia unless they expressly stated they wished to take their husband's nationality. Under the terms of the British Nationality Act 1948 British nationals in Australia were reclassified at that time as "Citizens of the UK and Colonies" (CUKC). The basic British nationality scheme did not change overmuch, and typically those who were previously defined as British remained the same. Changes included that wives and children no longer automatically acquired the status of the husband or father, children who acquired nationality by descent no longer were required to make a retention declaration, and registrations for children born abroad were extended.

Australia also enacted its own Nationality and Citizenship Act in 1948, which went into effect on 26 January 1949. Under its terms, a British subject who was born, or whose father was born or naturalised in Australia or Papua automatically became Australian nationals. It granted nationality to married women who were British subjects on the date of commencement of the Act, or to a woman who was the widow of someone who but for death would have become a national on that date. Also in 1949, Australia began administrating the two territories as a single entity; however, for nationality, the policies remained different in each area. From the 1960s, British policy was to align more closely with Europe and withdraw from Asia and the Pacific. In an effort to improve its strategic and economic interests, Australia cancelled its White Australia policy, refused to back the Dutch in their efforts to retain control of Western New Guinea, and began making moves for a closer integration with Asia. To change its image as a coloniser, Australia granted self-governance to Papua and New Guinea in 1973.

=== Post independence (1975–present) ===
On 16 September 1975, the Independent State of Papua New Guinea, combining the two former territories, became fully independent. (Note: According to Laurie Fransman, a leading expert on British nationality law, Papua New Guinea was not included as a Commonwealth nation under the 1948 British Nationality Act, as it was defined under Australia. From 1975 to 1980, Papua New Guinea was considered a foreign nation with regard to British nationality. By terms of the Papua New Guinea, Western Samoa and Nauru (Miscellaneous Provisions) Act 1980 it became an independent Commonwealth Country on 31 January 1980 and thereafter was included in the British Nationality Act 1981 and its revision in 1983.) At independence, Papua New Guinea conferred nationality upon any person born in the territory who had two grandparents born in Papua New Guinea, or who were members of an indigenous society of Papua New Guinea but born in Irian Jaya, the New Hebrides, the Solomon Islands or the Torres Strait Islands. It allowed persons born abroad to similarly described two grandparents to apply for naturalization within one year of independence, or within one year of birth after independence. The 1975 Constitution granted women individual nationality and the right for their children to derive their nationality. It also disallowed dual nationality, except in the case of a woman who automatically acquired the nationality of a spouse upon marriage, or a child, under the age of majority, as minors who had dual nationality were permitted one year from reaching age eighteen to choose nationality. In 2016, amendments were made to the Citizenship Act to allow spouses of any gender to derive the nationality of their Papua New Guinean spouse.
