= Ugi Biritu =

Papua New Guinean politician

Member of the House of Assembly
- In office 1964–1967
- Succeeded by: Bono Azanifa
- Constituency: Henganofi

Personal details
- Born: c. 1937 Mobei, Territory of New Guinea
- Died: 15 March 1967 Goroka, Papua and New Guinea

Ugi Biritu (c. 1937 – 15 March 1967) was a Papua New Guinean politician. He served as a member of the House of Assembly between 1964 and his death in 1967.

== Biography ==
Biritu was born around 1937 in Mobei. He was baptised into the Lutheran Church between 1956 and 1958. He initially trained to be a teacher, before spending a year at the Medical Training School in Goroka, qualifying as an aid post orderly. He worked for the Public Works Department as a labourer and plumber, before becoming a peanut farmer in 1959. Two years later he moved to Lufa to work as an interpreter for the Department of Native Affairs.

Biritu contested the Henganofi constituency in the 1964 elections. Although he was illiterate, he was the only candidate to speak almost every language and dialect spoken in the constituency. Bono Azanifa received over 4,000 more first preference votes than Biritu, but Biritu received almost all the second preference votes from the other three candidates' voters, overtaking Azanifa on the fourth count. After being elected, he expanded his agricultural activities to start farming coffee, potatoes, cattle and goats.

Biritu died of an epileptic seizure in Goroka in March 1967. His funeral was attended by more than 2,000 people.

== See also ==
- List of members of the Papua New Guinean Parliament who died in office
