= Harold Reeve =

Australian public servant

Official Member of the House of Assembly
- In office 1964–1966

Assistant Administrator (Economic Affairs)
- In office 1961–1966
- Succeeded by: Frank Henderson

Official Member of the Legislative Council
- In office 1951–1964

Treasurer and Director of Finance
- In office 1950–1961

Member of the Executive Council
- In office 1950–1960

Administrator of Nauru
- In office 1949
- Preceded by: Mark Ridgway
- Succeeded by: Robert Richards

Personal details
- Born: 25 March 1908; Sydney, Australia
- Died: 15 November 1973 (aged 65); Sydney, Australia

Harold Hastings Reeve (25 March 1908 – 15 November 1973) was an Australian public servant. He was briefly Administrator of Nauru in 1949, before joining the civil service in the Territory of Papua and New Guinea in 1950, where he held several senior positions until his retirement in 1966, including serving in the Legislative Council and House of Assembly.

== Biography ==
Reeve was born in Sydney in 1908. He became a master builder, before joining the Commonwealth Treasury in 1941. In 1949 he briefly served as Administrator of Nauru, before moving to the Territory of Papua and New Guinea to become Director of Finance and Treasurer in 1950, also becoming a member of the Executive Council.

In 1951 he became an official member of the new Legislative Council. In 1961 he became Assistant Administrator (Economic Affairs), and when the new House of Assembly was created in 1964, he continued as an official member.

Reeve retired in 1966. He died in Sydney in 1973 and was survived by his wife Kathleen and two children.
