= Percy Chatterton =

Papua New Guinean politician (1898–1984)

Member of the House of Assembly
- In office 1968–1972
- Constituency: Moresby Open
- In office 1964–1968
- Succeeded by: Oala Oala-Rarua
- Constituency: Central Special

Personal details
- Born: 8 October 1898 Ashton upon Mersey, United Kingdom
- Died: 25 November 1984 (aged 86) Port Moresby, Papua New Guinea

Sir Percy Chatterton OBE (8 October 1898 – 25 November 1984) was an English-born Papua New Guinean educator, clergyman and politician. He served as a member of the House of Assembly from 1964 to 1972.

== Biography ==
Chatterton was born in Ashton upon Mersey, near Sale, Cheshire in England in 1898, the son of Alice (née Macro) and Henry Herbert Chatterton. After attending the Stationers' Company's School in London between 1906 and 1912, he finished his education at the City of London School, matriculating in June 1916. He began a science degree at University College but was called up into the army in June 1917. As a Quaker committed to non-violence, he served with the Middlesex Regiment as a stretcher-bearer in France. Although he returned to university after the war, he did not complete his degree.

In 1921 Chatterton began working as a physical education and science teacher at the Friends School in Penketh. He also taught at a Sunday school and ran a Boy Scout troupe. In 1923 he joined the London Missionary Society and agreed to be posted to Port Moresby in the Territory of Papua as a lay missionary teacher. After marrying Christian Ritchie Finlayson in June 1924, the couple moved to Papua. He ran the LMS school in Hanuabada between 1924 and 1939, with Christian teaching the infant year groups.

Chatterton was posted to Delena as a missionary in 1939 and was ordained into the Congregational Church four years later. He returned to Port Moresby in 1957, where he became a vicar in the Koki suburb. He was heavily involved in setting up Papua Ekalesia in 1962, the first locally-run church in the territory, becoming its first chairman. He sat on the Council of Social Services and Central District Advisory Council, and was appointed to the Liquor Commission in 1962.

After retiring in 1963, Chatterton turned to politics. He was appointed to Education Advisory Board in 1963, and was elected to the new House of Assembly from the Central Special constituency in the 1964 elections. He became a regular columnist in Pacific Islands Monthly in 1966, and was re-elected in 1968 from the Moresby Open seat, but did not run for re-election in 1972. He was awarded an OBE in the New Year Honours that year and awarded an honorary LLD by the University of Papua New Guinea.

After ending his columns in Pacific Islands Monthly in 1973, he published a Hiri Motu translation of the Bible the following year, alongside a memoir Day That I Have Loved. He was promoted to Knight Commander of the Order of the British Empire (KBE) in the 1981 Birthday Honours and was featured on postage stamps in 1982. He died in Port Moresby in November 1984 and was given a state funeral.
