= Buang Rural LLG =

Local-level government in Papua New Guinea

- Location within Papua New Guinea
- Coordinates: 6.875263°S 146.76944°E
- Country: Papua New Guinea
- Province: Morobe Province
- Time zone: UTC+10 (AEST)

Buang Rural LLG is a local-level government (LLG) of Morobe Province, Papua New Guinea.

== Wards ==
- 01. Bugiau
- 02. Wagau
- 03. Mambumb
- 04. Muniau
- 05. Aiyayok
- 06. Rari/Bugweb
- 07. Dawong
- 08. Lomalom
- 09. Bulandem
- 10. Chimburuk
- 11. Mapos 1
- 12. Mapos 2
- 13. Sagaiyo
- 14. Pepekane
- 15. Lagis/Tokane
- 16. Mangga
- 17. Bayamatu
- 18. Kwasang
- 19. Zeri
- 20. Zamondang/Bayauaga
