= Sinake Giregire =

Sir Sinake Giregire

Member of the House of Assembly of Papua and New Guinea
- In office 1964–1977
- Preceded by: New parliament
- Succeeded by: Sabumei Kofikai
- Constituency: Goroka Open (1964-1968)
- Preceded by: New seat
- Succeeded by: Gai Duwabane
- Constituency: Daulo Open (1968-1977)

Personal details
- Political party: PNG Country Party (1974-2012)

Sir Sinake Giregire (c. 1937 – 4 January 2012) was a Papua New Guinean businessman and politician.

Giregire was born at Gimisaveh village in the Asaro Valley. He began his education at the Asaroka Lutheran School before moving to Finschhafen in Morobe Province in 1946 to train as a teacher at Heldsbach Lutheran School. He returned to the Asaro Valley in the mid-1950s, worked as a mechanic and an agricultural assistant and set up a sawmill. He then purchased land and began planting coffee, eventually coming to hold three coffee plantations and a coffee factory and owning what was believed to be the largest coffee plantation then owned by a Papua New Guinean at a time when farming was dominated by white expatriates. He was the first secretary of the local Farmers' Association in 1956. He was then elected to the first Asaro Watabung Local Level Government Council with the introduction of local government and became its first president, although sources differ on the year that occurred.

He was elected to the colonial House of Assembly of Papua and New Guinea at the 1964 election, the first election to be held in Papua New Guinea. He was assistant administrator for services in the first parliament, and in 1966, he initiated a bill which successfully banned playing cards in Papua New Guinea, the first successful legislation by a black member. In 1967, he co-founded the conservative Compass Party, the forerunner of the United Party. He was re-elected in 1968, becoming ministerial member for agriculture, stock and fisheries, later being shifted to post and telegraphs until 1972. He was re-elected for the final time in 1972.

In the leadup to independence, Giregire was the only member on all three constitutional development and planning committees between 1964 and 1975. He supported the Australian colonial role in Papua New Guinea and was a strong opponent of independence. He formed the PNG Country Party in 1974, but was defeated by Gai Duwabane at the first post-independence election in 1977. He had nominated to become the first Governor-General of Papua New Guinea in 1975, but had been defeated 53-38 by John Guise.

After his political defeat, he became president of the Highlands Farmers and Settlers Association in 1984, having become the first Papua New Guinean member of the formerly all-white organisation in 1958. His early coffee processing business ran into difficulties, but he continued to own a coffee plantation and factory and held various other business interests up until his death. He revived the Country Party after a long period of inactivity in 2001 and contested the 2002 election, but was narrowly defeated in his bid to re-enter parliament.

He was made a Member of the Order of the British Empire (MBE) in 2000. He was knighted in 2006.

He died in January 2012 and was buried at his first plantation the following month.
