= Charles Littler =

- Born: Charles Augustus Murray Littler; 26 March 1868; Launceston, Tasmania, Australia
- Died: 3 September 1916 (aged 48); Near Pozières, France
- Burial place: Villers-Bretonneux Australian National Memorial
- Military career
- Allegiance: Colony of Tasmania; United States; Australia
- Branch: Tasmanian Volunteer Force (1896–1904); United States Army (1904–08); Australian Imperial Force (1914–16)
- Service years: c. 1896–1904 c. 1905–1908; 1914–1916
- Rank: Captain
- Nickname: "Duke of Anzac"
- Units: 12th Battalion (1914–16); 52nd Battalion (1916)
- Conflicts: Philippine–American War; Moro Rebellion; First World War; Gallipoli campaign; Landing at Anzac Cove; Evacuation of Gallipoli; Western Front; Battle of the Somme; Battle of Mouquet Farm
- Awards: Distinguished Service Order; Mentioned in Despatches

Charles Augustus Murray Littler, DSO (26 March 1868 – 3 September 1916) was an Australian soldier and businessman. Born in Launceston, Tasmania, to Augustus East Littler and Hannah Sarah (née Murray), he married Helen Cotgrave Thomas in 1892 and had three sons. In 1910, Littler became manager of a rubber and coconut company on the island of Mindanao. Due to financial problems, he returned to Tasmania in 1914 and joined the Australian Imperial Force on 16 December. He embarked for Egypt with the 12th Battalion on 2 February 1915 and fought in the Gallipoli campaign, where he was awarded the Distinguished Service Order. Littler was killed in action during the Battle of Mouquet Farm.
