= Tore Lokoloko =

2nd governor-general of Papua New Guinea

Sir Tore Lokoloko GCL GCMG GCVO OBE

2nd Governor-General of Papua New Guinea
- In office 1 March 1977 – 1 March 1983
- Monarch: Elizabeth II
- Prime Minister: Michael Somare; Julius Chan
- Preceded by: Sir John Guise
- Succeeded by: Sir Kingsford Dibela

Personal details
- Born: 21 September 1930 Iokea, Territory of Papua
- Died: 13 March 2013 (aged 82) Port Moresby, Papua New Guinea
- Cause of death: Respiratory failure
- Resting place: Iokea
- Party: United Party
- Spouse: Lady Lalahaia
- Children: 11

Sir Tore Lokoloko GCL GCMG GCVO OBE (21 September 1930 – 13 March 2013) was a Papua New Guinean politician who served as the second governor-general of Papua New Guinea from 1977 to 1983. He was governor-general during Queen Elizabeth's Silver Jubilee visit to the country, when he was appointed GCVO and GCMG.

Lokoloko was born in the village of Iokea, Papua (now in Gulf Province, Papua New Guinea). He was the son of Paramount Chief Lokoloko Tore, and attended the Sogeri School, set up by the former Australian administrators in 1944.

Like Sir John Guise, Lokoloko had been a member of the House of Assembly of Papua and New Guinea prior to self-government, from 1968 to 1972. He was selected to replace Guise as Governor-General on 18 February 1977, and remained in that position through 1 March 1983. He later became the chairman of Indosuez Niugine Bank, a position he remained in through 1989. Lokoloko died on 13 March 2013 of respiratory failure after a severe asthma attack.

Government offices
| Preceded by Sir John Guise | Governor-General of Papua New Guinea; 1977–1983 | Succeeded by Sir Kingsford Dibela |
