= Kafentina Rural LLG =

Local-level government in Papua New Guinea

- Country: Papua New Guinea
- Province: Eastern Highlands Province
- Time zone: UTC+10 (AEST)

District map of Eastern Highlands Province

Kafentina Rural LLG is a local-level government (LLG) of Eastern Highlands Province, Papua New Guinea.

== Wards ==
- 01. Kompri
- 02. Krevanofi
- 03. Avani
- 04. Ababe, Keka (Ifompaga) & Hayafaga
- 05. Yohotegave
- 06. Fomurenave
- 07. Finintugu
- 08. Kamanonka
- 09. Tebega
- 10. Tebenofi
- 11. Henganofi Station
