= Frank Henderson (public servant) =

Australian agriculturalist and public servant

Assistant Administrator (Economic Affairs)
- In office 1966–1969

Official Member of the Member of the House of Assembly
- In office 1964–1969
- Succeeded by: James Ritchie

Official Member of the Member of the Legislative Council
- In office 1959–1964

Director of Agriculture, Stock and Fisheries
- In office 1958–1966

Personal details
- Born: 8 March 1911 Broken Hill, Australia
- Died: 21 July 1969 (aged 58) Port Moresby, Papua and New Guinea

Frank Cotter Henderson OBE (8 March 1911 – 21 July 1969) was an Australian agriculturalist and public servant. He held senior positions in the government of the Territory of Papua and New Guinea and served as an official member of the Legislative Council and House of Assembly.

== Biography ==
Henderson was born in 1911 in Broken Hill. After graduating from the University of Sydney with an agricultural science degree, he moved to the Territory of New Guinea in 1936 to become an Agricultural Officer. He initially worked at Kerevat, before being transferred to Talasea. He married Joyce in 1938. Following the Japanese invasion, he helped evacuate civilians, sailing from Talasea to Cairns in Australia. He subsequently served in the RAAF.

He returned to New Guinea after the war, focussing on the development of cocoa plantations. In 1951 he was appointed head of the Division of Plant Industry, moving to Port Moresby the following year. In 1958 he was appointed Director of Agriculture, Stock and Fisheries. He became an official member of the Legislative Council the following year, and was appointed to the new Member of the House of Assembly following the 1964 elections. He was promoted to Assistant Administrator (Economic Affairs) in 1966, also becoming Leader of Government Members in the House of Assembly.

Henderson was made an OBE in 1967. He died in Port Moresby in July 1969 at the age of 58.

== See also ==
- List of members of the Papua New Guinean Parliament who died in office
