= Bill Bloomfield =

Australia-born Papua New Guinean politician

Member of the House of Assembly
- In office 1964–1966
- Succeeded by: Tony Voutas
- Constituency: Kaindi

Personal details
- Born: 4 October 1912; Cooktown, Australia
- Died: 12 February 1966 (aged 53); Brisbane, Australia

William John Bloomfield (4 October 1912 – 12 February 1966) was an Australia-born Papua New Guinean politician. He served as a member of the House of Assembly between 1964 and his death in 1966.

== Biography ==
Born in Cooktown, Queensland in 1912, Bloomfield worked in the mining industry as a driller. After working in Australia for several years, he moved to the Morobe district of the Territory of New Guinea, working at Wau. He joined the Public Service Association, becoming a representative of the Wau branch, and helped set up the Wau Timber Workers Union in the early 1960s.

Having been a member of the Australian Labor Party for many years, Bloomfield contested the Kaindi Open constituency in Papua New Guinea's first multi-racial general elections in 1964, making speeches in both English and Pidgin. Without a strong support base, his strategy was to win on the preference votes, asking voters to put him as their second preference. The strategy was successful as he was elected to the new House of Assembly after overtaking his closest rival on the eighth count.

Bloomfield died in hospital in Brisbane in February 1966 at the age of 53.

== See also ==
- List of members of the Papua New Guinean Parliament who died in office
