= Paul Lapun =

Papua New Guinea politician

Sir Paul Lapun

Minister of Mines and Energy
- In office 1972–1977

Member of the National Parliament of Papua New Guinea
- In office 1972–1977

Member of the House of Assembly of Papua and New Guinea
- In office 1964–1972

Personal details
- Born: 1923 Buin, Territory of New Guinea
- Died: 26 October 2003 (Aged 79 or 80)
- Spouse: Lady Sarah Lapun
- Children: 3 daughters; two sons

Sir Paul Lapun KBE (1923 – 26 October 2003) was a Papua New Guinean politician. Both a supporter of independence for Papua New Guinea (PNG) and of the secessionist movement on Bougainville, Lapun served in the House of Assembly of Papua and New Guinea and in the first National Parliament of Papua New Guinea between 1972 and 1975, when he was Minister for Mines and Energy. He was instrumental in obtaining royalties for the people of Bougainville for the copper mine on their island. He was the first Papua New Guinean to receive a knighthood.

== Early life and education ==
Paul Lapun was born in Mabes village, Banoni, in what was, at the time, the Buin sub-district of the North Solomons District of the Territory of New Guinea, an Australian-administered United Nations trust territory. In 1936 he joined the Chabai Catholic seminary in northwest Bougainville, from where he was evacuated in 1942 before the Japanese occupation during World War II. He left the seminary in 1948, although he continued to teach there until the 1960s. After leaving the seminary, Lapun established a plantation and a marketing cooperative. Without encouraging it, by the 1960s he had become the focus of an embryonic cargo cult. In 1962 he went to Australia to observe the operation of local councils, founding the Banoni village council on his return.

== Political career ==
In 1964 Lapun was elected to the first House of Assembly of Papua and New Guinea for the South Bougainville seat, and was made undersecretary for Forests. He was an outspoken critic of the colonial government's policies and faced considerable opposition from the administration. In 1967, he persuaded the House of Assembly, despite protests from members of the House who had been appointed by the Australian government, to agree that 5% of government royalty receipts from the Rio Tinto copper, gold and silver mine at Panguna on Bougainville should go to the local people. This was at a time when initial operations at the mine had had to be suspended because of protests. Lapun had originally demanded that 50% of the royalties should go to the people. Under an earlier proposal agreed by the Australian government and the company, the people would have received just 5 percent of the unimproved value of the land. Lapun joined the Pangu Party, which, in 1975, would lead the first government of independent Papua New Guinea, with Michael Somare as prime minister. In 1967 he became the first parliamentary leader of the Pangu Pati, a position he held until 1972 when he resigned in favour of Somare. He was easily re-elected in the 1968 and 1972 elections. After the 1972 election he was made minister for Mines and Energy and was then closely involved in the renegotiation of the Bougainville mine agreement, which increased the royalties received by PNG.

Having resolved the issue of compensation, Lapun then turned his attention to the question of independence for Bougainville. In 1969 he was one of the founders of the Bougainville secessionist movement and in the same year he became patron of the pro-independence Napidakoe Navitu movement. Support for the secessionists increased as the result of the government wanting to remove people from their land to make way for Arawa, a new town to serve the mine, and after two civil servants from Bougainville were murdered in Goroka in the PNG highlands. Lapun thus found himself in a contradictory position of being a leading member of the Pangu Party, which stressed national unity, and being active in the movement that wanted to secede from PNG. In 1977 he failed to be re-elected as younger secessionists, who had more appeal for the electorate, had emerged with more of a confrontational approach than that being followed by Lapun.

== Honours ==
Lapun was knighted in Queen Elizabeth II's 1974 Birthday Honours on behalf of the newly self-governing Papua New Guinea government, becoming a Knight Commander of the Order of the British Empire. In the same year he hosted the Queen and Prince Philip, Duke of Edinburgh on their visit to Bougainville. He was the first Papua New Guinean to be given a knighthood.

== Later life and death ==
After his election defeat in 1977, he lived in Bougainville. He died 26 October 2003 in the Bana district of south Bougainville. Lapun was married to Sarah Lapun and they had three daughters and two sons.
