= Talasea =

Coordinates: 5°17′S 150°01′E

Talasea is a village on the Talasea Peninsula, West New Britain Province, Papua New Guinea. It is located in Talasea Rural LLG.
