= John Gunther (public servant) =

Australian public servant

Sir John Gunther CMG OBE

Official Member of the House of Assembly
- In office 1964–1966

Official Member of the Legislative Council
- In office 1951–1964

Assistant Administrator
- In office 1957–1966

Personal details
- Born: John Thomson Gunther; 2 October 1910; Sydney, Australia
- Died: 27 April 1984 (aged 73); Melbourne, Australia
- Spouse: Grace Rickard-Bell
- Children: 2

Sir John Thomson Gunther CMG OBE (2 October 1910 – 27 April 1984) was an Australian public servant who spent most of his career in the Territory of Papua and New Guinea. Holding several key roles in the territory's civil service, he was also a member of the Legislative Council and House of Assembly from 1951 to 1966.

== Biography ==
Gunther was born on 2 October 1910 in Sydney, the son of Cyril Maynard Gunther, a chemist with the Colonial Sugar Refining Company, and Jean Graeme (née Thomson). The family moved to the Tweed River area when Gunther was a small child, but returned to Sydney in 1917. He attended Cranbrook School and was then a boarder at the King's School in Parramatta. He subsequently studied medicine at the University of Sydney, and represented the university at boxing and rugby.

Following a year of residency at Sydney Hospital, in 1935 he joined the Pacific Plantations branch of Lever Brothers, going to work as a medical officer in Gavutu and Tulagi in the Solomon Islands. In 1938 he married Grace Rickard-Bell and left his job with Pacific Plantations to become chair of a medical investigation into lead poisoning at Mount Isa. The couple went on to have two children. He then joined the Royal Australian Air Force in 1941, serving as a medical officer. He spent time in the Territory of Papua focusing on malaria prevention and was awarded diplomas in public health and tropical medicine from the University of Sydney in 1944. His wife was killed in a car accident in 1942. The following year he married Elvie Phyllis Hodge, with whom he had another two children. He became commanding officer of the 1st Australian Tropical Research Field Unit in 1944, holding the post until 1946.

Following the war Gunther was appointed Director of Public Health in the Territory of Papua and New Guinea in 1946. In this role he was appointed to the Legislative Council in 1951 and also became a member of the Executive Council and later the Administrator's Council. He became the first chairman of the South Pacific Commission Research Council in 1948 and was involved with the local branches of the Red Cross and St John's Ambulance. He was awarded an OBE in the 1954 New Year Honours. In 1957 he was promoted to Assistant Administrator, and after chairing the Legislative Council's Select Committee on Constitutional Development in 1962, he became an official member of the new House of Assembly in 1964.

In 1966 Gunther resigned as Assistant Administrator to become Vice-Chancellor of the new University of Papua New Guinea. He retired from the role due to ill health in 1972 and returned to Australia, initially living in Buderim in Queensland, before moving south to Melbourne. He died in Melbourne in 1984, survived by his wife and four children.

== Honours ==
Gunther was appointed an Officer of the Order of the British Empire (OBE) in the 1954 Birthday Honours.

In the 1965 New Year Honours he was appointed a Companion of the Order of St Michael and St George (CMG), and was knighted in the 1975 Birthday Honours.
