= 1968 Papua New Guinean general election =

General elections were held in the Territory of Papua and New Guinea between 17 February and 16 March 1968.

== Electoral system ==
Constitutional developments prior to the elections saw the House of Assembly expanded from 64 members to 94. The number of members elected from general constituencies was increased from 44 to 69; the ten reserved constituencies (for non-indigenous candidates) were replaced by 15 regional constituencies in which candidates had to have at least at Intermediate Certificate of education, and the number of 'official' members (civil servants) remained at ten. The elections were held using instant-runoff voting.

An additional residency requirement for non-indigenous candidates was introduced; candidates had to have lived in the territory for at least five years before nomination day. This requirement was waived for incumbent MHAs, allowing Tony Voutas (elected in a 1966 by-election) to defend his seat.

== Campaign ==
A total of 484 candidates contested the 84 seats, with around 50 running in the 15 regional constituencies. Six political parties were involved; the All People's Party, the National Progress Party, the New Guinea Agriculture Reform Party, the Pangu Party, the Territory Country Party and the United Democratic Party.

Four constituencies had only one candidate, who were returned unopposed (Tei Abal in Wabag, Wesani Iwoksim in Upper Sepik, Paul Langro in West Sepik Regional and Ron Neville in Southern Highlands Regional).

The main campaign issues in urban areas were wages and housing. In rural areas, the campaign focussed on improved agriculture and infrastructure.

== Results ==
Only 22 of the 46 incumbents MHAs who stood for re-election were successful. The candidate leading in the first count was elected in 71 of the 80 contested seats. In Gumine, the candidate who finished sixth in the first count was elected after preferences were counted. Four under-secretaries lost their seat, including Zure Makili Zurecnuoc.

Although party affiliations were unclear, the Pangu Party was thought to have the most seats (between 12 and 20), with the All People's Party finishing second. The National Progress Party and United Democratic Party failed to win seats.

== Aftermath ==
Following the elections, John Guise was elected Speaker, defeating Mick Casey and Roy Ashton. Seven ministerial members and eight assistant ministerial members were appointed by a House committee.

Ministerial members
Position	Member
Agriculture, Stock and Fisheries	Tei Abal
Education	Matthias Toliman
Labour	Toua Kapena
Posts and Telegraphs	Sinake Giregire
Public Health	Tore Lokoloko
Public Works	Roy Ashton
Trade and Industry	Angmai Bilas
Assistant – Cooperatives	Lepani Watson
Assistant – Forests	Siwi Kurundo
Assistant – Information and Extension Services	Paul Langro
Assistant – Lands Surveys and Mines	Andrew Wabiria
Assistant – Local Government	Kaibelt Diria
Assistant – Rural Development	Meck Singilong
Assistant – Technical Education and Training	Joseph Lue
Assistant – Treasury	Oala Oala-Rarua

== See also ==
- Members of the House of Assembly of Papua and New Guinea, 1968–1972
