= John Guise (Papua New Guinean politician) =

1st governor-general of Papua New Guinea

Sir John Guise GCMG KBE

1st Governor-General of Papua New Guinea
- In office 6 September 1975 – 1 March 1977
- Monarch: Elizabeth II
- Prime Minister: Michael Somare
- Preceded by: Position established
- Succeeded by: Tore Lokoloko

Personal details
- Born: John Douglas Guise; 29 August 1914 (Note: In a 1985 interview, Guise states that his birthday is on 14 August. In the same interview he later states he was born on 29 August.) Gedulalara, Milne Bay, Territory of Papua
- Died: 7 February 1991 (aged 76) Port Moresby, National Capital District, Papua New Guinea
- Citizenship: Australian; Papuan
- Children: 9
- Education: Vunadidir Council College
- Police career
- Allegiance: Papua and New Guinea (Note: Guise joined the Royal Papuan Constabulary in 1946, which was an Australian territory at the time. Papua New Guinea later expanded to include what is commonly known as present-day Papua New Guinea.)
- Department: Royal Papuan Constabulary
- Branch: Regimental Sergeant Major
- Service years: 1946–1955
- Rank: Sergeant Major

Sir John Douglas Guise GCMG KBE (29 August 1914 – 7 February 1991) was a Papua New Guinean politician who served as the first governor-general of Papua New Guinea after the country's independence from Australia in 1975. Prior to the independence itself, Guise was a vocal advocate for a peaceful secession from Australia.

He was born in Gedulalara village, near Dogura, and was educated there at the mission school of a church in Milne Bay District. His grandfather was Reginald Guise, an English adventurer who reached Papua in the 1880s, settled as a trader and married locally.

He served in the Department of Native Affairs during the 1950s, and became the president of the Port Moresby Mixed Race Association in 1958. In the 1961 elections for the Legislative Council, he was elected in the Eastern Papua constituency. In 1964 he was elected to the new House of Assembly, and went on to serve as Speaker from 1968 to 1972.

Guise served as Governor-General of Papua New Guinea for two years. He resigned as Governor-General to contest the 1977 election against Michael Somare, where he was defeated. He remained politically active and considered as a potential leader during the civil unrest after his term in office. Guise died on 7 February 1991. After his death, a sports stadium was named in his honour.

He was appointed a Commander of the Order of the British Empire (CBE) in 1972, made a Knight Commander of the order (KBE) on 6 June 1975, and appointed a Knight Grand Cross of the Order of St Michael and St George (GCMG) on 16 September 1975.

== Bibliography ==
- Lentz, Harris M., III. Heads of States and Governments. Jefferson, NC: McFarland & Company, 1994. ISBN 0-89950-926-6.

Government offices
Preceded by Tom Critchley as High Commissioner of Papua New Guinea	Governor-General of Papua New Guinea; 1975–1977	Succeeded by Sir Tore Lokoloko
