= House of Assembly of Papua and New Guinea =

The House of Assembly of Papua and New Guinea was the legislature of the territory of Papua and New Guinea from 1964 to 1975. Before 1964, the Legislative Council of Papua and New Guinea sat from 1951 to 1964 under the Papua and New Guinea Act 1949. After independence in 1975, the legislature was renamed from the House of Assembly of Papua New Guinea to the National Parliament of Papua New Guinea.

From 1884 to 1902, Papua or British New Guinea was administered by Britain and then transferred to direct rule by Australia under the Papua Act 1906. Australian rule was interrupted during World War II.
