= Members of the National Parliament of Papua New Guinea, 2007–2012 =

This is a list of members of the National Parliament of Papua New Guinea from 2007 to 2012, as elected at the 2007 election.

Member	Party	Electorate	Province	Term in office
Sam Abal	National Alliance Party	Wabag Open	Enga	2002–2003, 2004–2012
Charles Abel	Independent	Alotau Open	Milne Bay	2007–present
Anderson Agiru	United Resources Party	Southern Highlands Provincial	Southern Highlands	1997–2002, 2007–2016
Paru Aihi	Papua New Guinea Party	Kairuku-Hiri Open	Central	2007–2012
Tony Aimo	People's Action Party	Ambunti-Dreikikir Open	East Sepik	2002–2012, 2012–2013
Martin Aini	Pangu Party	Kavieng Open	New Ireland	2002–2012
Benny Allan	United Resources Party	Unggai-Bena Open	Eastern Highlands	2002–present
Sir Arnold Amet	National Alliance Party	Madang Provincial	Madang	2007–2012
David Arore	Independent	Ijivitari Open	Northern	2007–2015, 2015–2017
Ronald Asik	People's Action Party	Wosera Gaui Open	East Sepik	2007–2012
Francis Awesa	Papua New Guinea Party	Imbonggu Open	Southern Highlands	2007–2017
Sam Basil	People's Progress Party	Bulolo Open	Morobe	2007–present
Sai Beseo	People's Party	Kainantu Open	Eastern Highlands	2007–2012
Roy Biyama	United Resources Party	Middle Fly Open	Western	2002–present
John Boito	People's Democratic Movement	Obura-Wonenara Open	Eastern Highlands	2007–2012
Pitom Bombom	Independent	Kerema Open	Gulf	2007–2012
Timothy Bonga	Independent	Nawae Open	Morobe	1982–1992, 2007–2012
Jack Cameron	People's Democratic Movement	Kiriwina-Goodenough Open	Milne Bay	2007–2012
Byron Chan	People's Progress Party	Namatanai Open	New Ireland	2002–2017
Sir Julius Chan	People's Progress Party	New Ireland Provincial	New Ireland	1977–1997, 2007–present
John Luke Crittin	Independent	Milne Bay Provincial	Milne Bay	2007–2012, 2017–present
Bob Dadae	United Party	Kabwum Open	Morobe	2002–2017
Dr Bob Danaya	PNG Labour Party	Western Provincial	Western	2002–2012
Lucas Dekena	National Alliance Party	Gumine Open	Chimbu	2007–2013
Leo Dion	National Alliance Party	East New Britain Provincial	East New Britain	2000–2017
William Duma	United Resources Party	Hagen Open	Western Highlands	2002–present
Philemon Embel	Pangu Party	Nipa-Kutubu Open	Southern Highlands	1987–2002, 2007–2012
Ken Fairweather	Independent	Sumkar Open	Madang	2007–2017
Fr John Garia	Papua New Guinea Party	Chimbu Provincial	Chimbu	2007–2012
James Gau (Note: Rai Coast Open MP Niuro Toko Sapia, who had only been elected in a 2007 by-election, died on 28 October 2009. James Gau won the resulting by-election in May 2010.)	Independent	Rai Coast Open	Madang	2010–2017
Wake Goi	Papua New Guinea Party	Jimi Open	Western Highlands	2007–2012
Thompson Harokaqveh	Pangu Party	Goroka Open	Eastern Highlands	2007–2012
John Hickey	National Alliance Party	Bogia Open	Madang	2002–2017
Peter Humphreys	National Alliance Party	West New Britain Provincial	West New Britain	2007–2012
Koni Iguan	People's Labour Party	Markham Open	Morobe	2007–2012, 2017–present
Peter Ipatas	People's Party	Enga Provincial	Enga	1997–present
Peter Iwei	People's Democratic Movement	Telefomin Open	West Sepik	2007–2012
Isaac Joseph	New Generation Party	Mendi Open	Southern Highlands	2007–2012
Miki Kaeok	National Alliance Party	Wapenamanda Open	Enga	2002–2012
Steven Pirika Kama (Note: The National Court declared the election of South Bougainville Open MP Michael Laimo to be null and void on 21 February 2008. The court ordered a recount, which was won by Steven Pirika Kama. A subsequent National Court ruling on 9 October 2008 declared Manwau to be the validly elected member for Wewak Open.)	United Resources Party	South Bougainville Open	Bougainville	2012–2016
Gabriel Kapris	People's Action Party	Maprik Open	East Sepik	2002–2012
Havila Kavo	People's National Congress	Gulf Provincial	Gulf	2007–2017
John Kekeno	People's Action Party	Koroba-Lake Kopiago Open	Southern Highlands	2006–2012
Dame Carol Kidu	Melanesian Alliance Party	Moresby South Open	NCD	1997–2012
Philip Kikala	National Alliance Party	Lagaip-Porgera Open	Enga	2007–2012
Boka Kondra	Independent	North Fly Open	Western	2007–2016
Tobias Kulang (Note: Kundiawa Open MP Joe Mek Teine died on 25 April 2011. Tobias Kulang won the resulting by-election in August 2011.)	Constitutional Democratic Party	Kundiawa Open	Chimbu	2011–2017
Samson Kuli	People's Party	Usino Bundi Open	Madang	2007–2012
Andrew Kumbakor	Pangu Party	Nuku Open	West Sepik	1997–2012
James Lagea	PNG Conservative Party	Kagua-Erave Open	Southern Highlands	2007–2017
Michael Laimo	National Alliance Party	South Bougainville Open	Bougainville	1992–2008
Mark Maipakai	National Alliance Party	Kikori Open	Gulf	2002–2017
Moses Maladina	Rural Development Party	Esa'ala Open	Milne Bay	2002–2012
Buka Malai	Independent	Madang Open	Madang	2007–2012
Andrew Mald	Independent	Moresby North-East Open	NCD	2007–2012
Dr Moses Manwau (Note: The National Court declared the election of Wewak Open MP Jim Simatab to be null and void on 24 June 2010. The court ordered a recount within 21 days, which was won by Moses Manwau. A subsequent National Court ruling on 4 August 2010 declared Manwau to be the validly elected member for Wewak Open.)	People's Party	Wewak Open	East Sepik	2010–2012
James Marape	National Alliance Party	Tari Open	Southern Highlands	2007–present
Dr Allan Marat	Melanesian Liberal Party	Rabaul Open	East New Britain	2002–present
Francis Marus	Pangu Party	Talasea Open	West New Britain	2007–2017
Jamie Maxtone-Graham	PNG Country Party	Anglimp-South Waghi Open	Western Highlands	2004–2012
Posi Menai	People's Action Party	Karimui-Nomane Open	Chimbu	2002–2012
Vincent Michaels	Independent	Tewae-Siassi Open	Morobe	2007–2012
Jimmy Miringtoro	People's Democratic Movement	Central Bougainville Open	Bougainville	2007–2017
Sir Mekere Morauta	Papua New Guinea Party	Moresby North-West Open	NCD	1997–2012, 2017–present
Alphonse Moroi	Rural Development Party	Central Provincial	Central	2002–2012
Benjamin Mul	Papua New Guinea Party	North Waghi Open	Western Highlands	2007–2012
Belden Namah	National Alliance Party	Vanimo-Green River Open	West Sepik	2007–present
Jeffrey Nape	National Alliance Party	Sinasina-Yonggamugl Open	Chimbu	2002–2012
Anthony Nene	People's National Congress	Sohe Open	Northern	2007–2012
Jim Nomane	PNG Country Party	Chuave Open	Chimbu Provincial	2006–2012
Peter O'Neill	People's National Congress	Ialibu-Pangia Open	Southern Highlands	2002–present
Michael Ogio	People's Democratic Movement	North Bougainville Open	Bougainville	1987–2002, 2007–2011
Tom Olga	Independent	Western Highlands Provincial	Western Highlands	2007–2012
Ferao Orimyo	Papua New Guinea Party	Henganofi Open	Eastern Highlands	2007–2012
Bonny Oveyara	People's Progress Party	Okapa Open	Eastern Highlands	2007–2012
Ano Pala	National Alliance Party	Rigo Open	Central	2007–2017
Powes Parkop	Independent	Nat. Capital District Provincial	NCD	2007–present
Kondo Patrick	People's Labour Party	Daulo Open	Eastern Highlands	2007–2012
Bart Philemon	National Alliance Party	Lae Open	Morobe	1992–2012
Benjamin Philip	Rural Development Party	Menyamya Open	Morobe	2007–2017
Mathew Poia	National Alliance Party	Goilala Open	Central	2007–2012
Don Polye (Note: The National Court declared the election of Kandep Open MP Don Polye to be null and void on 14 August 2009 due to election irregularities. Polye won the resulting by-election in December 2009.)	National Alliance	Kandep Open	Enga	2002–2009, 2009–2017
Job Pomat	People's National Congress	Manus Open	Manus	2007–2012, 2017–present
Benjamin Poponawa	Independent	Tambul-Nebilyer Open	Western Highlands	2007–2017
Francis Potape	New Generation Party	Komo-Magarima Open	Southern Highlands	2007–2017
Patrick Pruaitch	National Alliance Party	Aitape-Lumi Open	West Sepik	2002–present
Tony Puana	New Generation Party	Kandrian-Gloucester Open	West New Britain	2007–2012
John Pundari	National Advance Party	Kompiam-Ambum Open	Enga	1992–2002, 2007–present
Sani Rambi	National Alliance Party	Baiyer-Mul Open	Western Highlands	2007–2012
Puri Ruing	Papua New Guinea Party	Dei Open	Western Highlands	1997–2002, 2007–2012
Michael Sapau	Rural Development Party	Manus Provincial	Manus	2007–2012
Niuro Toko Sapia (Note: Rai Coast Open MP James Yali had been convicted of rape charges prior to the general election, but was allowed to recontest his seat due to an outstanding appeal. He was re-elected, but his appeal was dismissed on August 13, 2007, resulting in the invalidation of his election win. Niuro Toko Sapia won the resulting by-election in November 2007.)	Independent	Rai Coast Open	Madang	2007–2009
Fidelis Semoso	Independent	Bougainville Provincial	Bougainville	2007–2012
Ben Semri	People's Action Party	Middle Ramu Open	Madang	2002–2012
Yawa Silupa	National Alliance Party	Lufa Open	Eastern Highlands	2002–2012
Jim Simatab	Independent	Wewak Open	East Sepik	2007–2010, 2012–2017
Malcolm 'Kela' Smith	Independent	Eastern Highlands Provincial	Eastern Highlands	2002–2012
Simon Solo	National Alliance Party	West Sepik Provincial	West Sepik	2007–2012
Arthur Somare	National Alliance Party	Angoram Open	East Sepik	1997–2012
Sir Michael Somare	National Alliance Party	East Sepik Provincial	East Sepik	1968–2017
Sali Subam	National Alliance Party	South Fly Open	Western	2007–2012
Malakai Tabar	Melanesian Liberal Party	Gazelle Open	East New Britain	2007–2017
Suckling Tamanabae	United Party	Northern Provincial	Northern	2007–2012
Patrick Tammur (Note: Kokopo Open MP Patrick Tammur died on 25 January 2012. No by-election was held due to the proximity of the 2012 election.)	Independent	Kokopo Open	East New Britain	2007–2012
Joe Mek Teine	PNG National Party	Kundiawa Open	Chimbu	2007–2011
Sir Puka Temu	National Alliance Party	Abau Open	Central	2002–2003, 2003–present
Paul Tiensten	National Alliance Party	Pomio Open	East New Britain	2002–2014
Peter Waranaka	National Alliance Party	Yangoru-Saussia Open	East Sepik	2004–2012
Guma Wau	United Resources Party	Kerowagi Open	Chimbu	2007–2012
Luther Wenge	People's First Party	Morobe Provincial	Morobe	1997–2012
Gordon Wesley	Independent	Samarai-Murua Open	Milne Bay	2002–2014, 2016–2017
James Yali	Independent	Rai Coast Open	Madang	2002–2007
Sasa Zibe	National Alliance Party	Huon Gulf Open	Morobe	2002–2012
Theo Zurenuoc	Independent	Finschhafen Open	Morobe	2007–2017
