= 2017 Papua New Guinean general election =

- 24 June – 8 July 2017
- All 111 seats in the National Parliament; 56 seats needed for a majority
Party	Leader	Vote %	Seats	+/–
PNC	Peter O'Neill	13.16	28	+1
NAP	Patrick Pruaitch	6.13	15	+8
THE Party	Don Polye	4.10	4	−8
Pangu Pati	Sam Basil	4.08	9	+8
URP	William Duma	3.93	10	+3
PPP	Ben Micah	3.46	5	−1
PNG Party	Belden Namah	2.74	5	−3
National Party	Kerenga Kua	2.36	3	+3
People's Party	Peter Ipatas	1.75	2	−4
SDP	Powes Parkop	1.64	2	−1
PLP	Benedict Simanjuang	1.62	2	+2
United Party	Rimbink Pato	1.41	1	0
One Nation	Peter Numu	1.31	1	New
CDP	Kelly Naru	1.27	1	+1
PDM	Paias Wingti	1.27	1	−1
CRP	Joseph Lelang	1.25	1	−1
PMC	Gary Juffa	0.95	1	−1
MAP	Joseph Yopyyopy	0.81	1	+1
Country Party	Nelson Duabane	0.68	1	0
ODP	Puka Temu	0.45	1	0
MLP	Allan Marat	0.21	1	−1
Independents	–	37.54	14	−2
This lists parties that won seats. See the complete results below.
Results by constituency
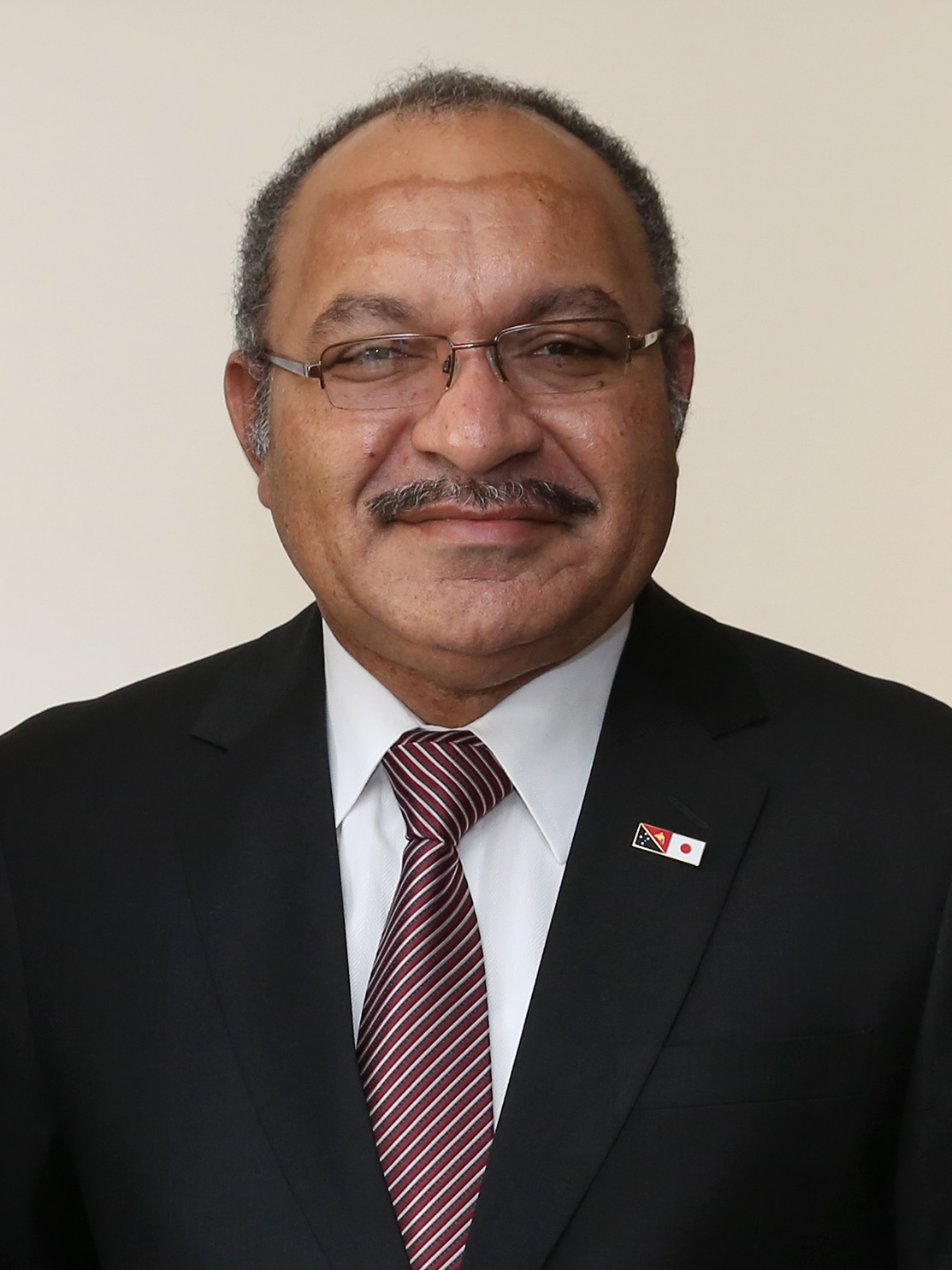

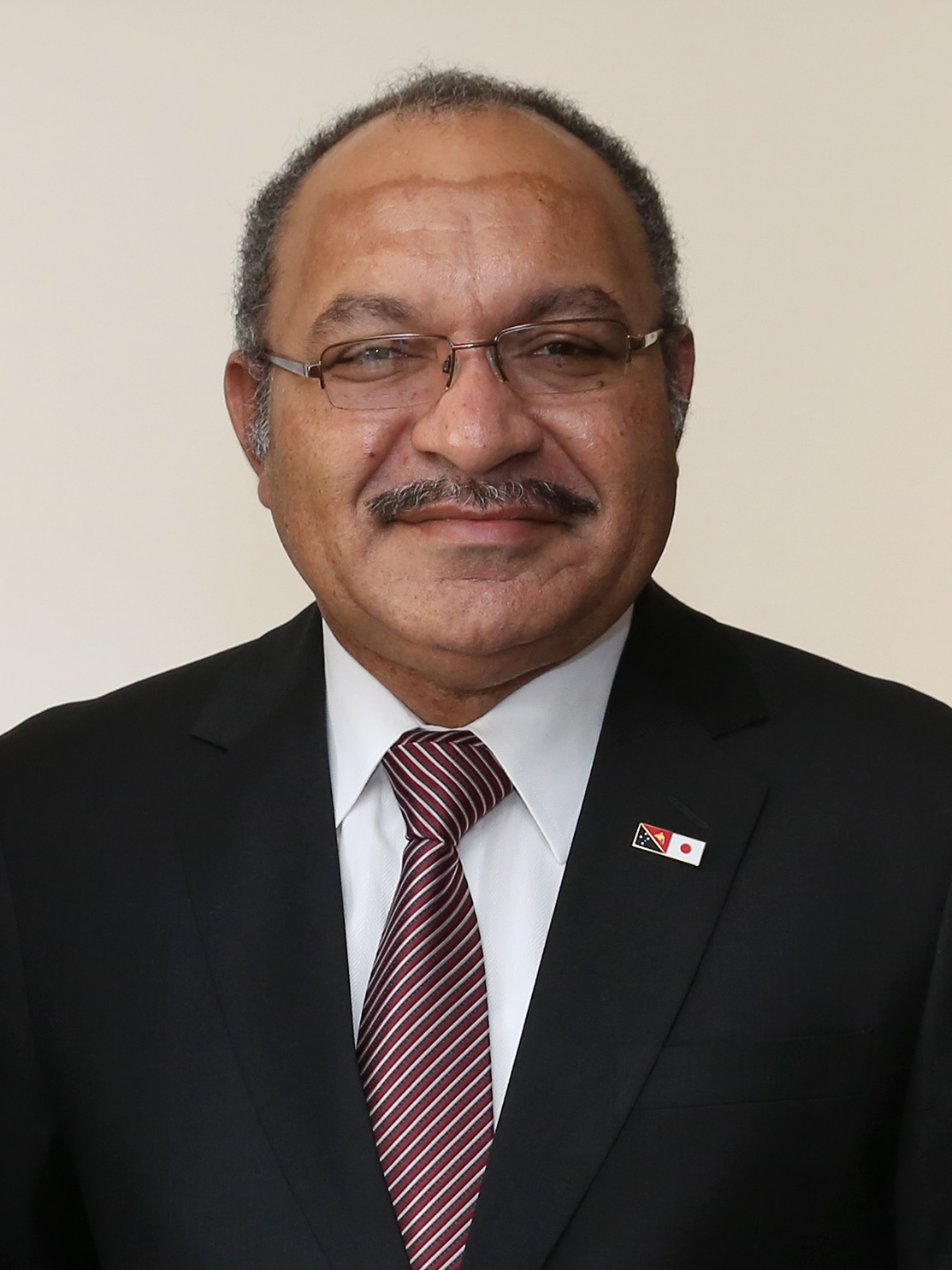
Prime Minister before	Prime Minister after
Peter O'Neill; PNC	Peter O'Neill; PNC

General elections were held in Papua New Guinea between 24 June and 8 July 2017. The writs for the election were issued on 20 April, and candidate nominations closed on 27 April.

Michael Somare, the first Prime Minister of Papua New Guinea, retired as a Member of National Parliament at the election. Somare has served continuously since he was first elected to the pre-independence House of Assembly in 1968, an unbroken term of 49 years.

On 1 August 2017 Peter O'Neill was re-elected as prime minister by Parliament by a vote of 64–40.

== Electoral system ==
The 111 members of the National Parliament were elected from single-member constituencies by preferential voting; voters were given up to three preferences, with a candidate declared elected once they received over 50% of preference votes. Of the 111 members, 89 were elected from "open" seats and 22 from provincial seats based on the twenty provinces, the Autonomous Region of Bougainville and the National Capital District (Port Moresby). The provincial members are also the governors of their respective provinces, unless they take a ministerial position, in which case the position goes to one of the members for the open seats.

=== Schedule ===
Important dates in the election are listed below.

20 April	Issue of Writs, opening of nominations and start of campaign period
27 April	Nominations close
24 June	Polling starts
8 July	Polling and campaign period ends, counting of the ballot paper begins
On or before 24 July	Return of Writs, counting of the ballot paper ends
7 August	Return of Writs for Local-Level Government Elections

The Return of Writs was postponed to 29 July due to few of the 111 seats being declared. The Writs were presented to Governor General Sir Robert Dadae on 29 July by Electoral Commissioner Patilias Gamato, with only 80 seats declared.

== Candidates ==
The Papua New Guinea Electoral Commission reported in preliminary figures that 3332 candidates have nominated to contest the election, 165 candidates of whom are women.

Province	Region	Male Candidates	Female Candidates	Total
Chimbu	Highlands Region	309	11	320
Eastern Highlands	Highlands Region	384	12	396
Enga	Highlands Region	154	8	162
Hela	Highlands Region	89	3	92
Jiwaka	Highlands Region	133	5	138
Southern Highlands	Highlands Region	116	1	117
Western Highlands	Highlands Region	95	3	98
A/R Bougainville	NGI Region	68	5	73
East New Britain	NGI Region	79	2	81
Manus	NGI Region	52	8	60
New Ireland	NGI Region	42	4	46
West New Britain	NGI Region	68	0	68
East Sepik	Momase Region	163	11	174
Madang	Momase Region	253	14	267
Morobe	Momase Region	314	13	327
West Sepik	Momase Region	92	5	97
Central	Papua Region	133	14	147
Gulf	Papua Region	133	12	145
Milne Bay	Papua Region	96	5	101
National Capital District	Papua Region	128	13	141
Northern	Papua Region	95	8	103
Western	Papua Region	171	8	179
Total		3167	165	3332

== Campaign ==
There has reportedly been less activity in the 2017 election compared to previous elections, with PNG National Party Leader Kerenga Kua saying "There is less colour, less movement, and that's not good, because you need to have some level of activity for educational purposes". Four people died in clashes regarding the election, with several candidates attacked during campaigning or nominations, to which Electoral Commissioner Patilias Gamato said "We have not gone into polls yet but already people are engaging in violent activities, threats and intimidation — that's unnecessary."

Ezekiel Anisi, MP for Ambunti-Dreikikir Open died suddenly on 24 May 2017 at a Port Moresby guesthouse in the midst of his re-election campaign.

== Conduct ==
The Bank of Papua New Guinea is concerned that 160 Million Kina of old currency which was stolen has the potential to influence the election. There are concerns in the Menyama District of Morobe Province that poor weather conditions affecting road transport could cause issues with the transportation of polling materials closer towards the election.

Significant issues with voting had arisen by late June. On 27 June, the day voting was due to begin in the National Capital District, voting in all three electorates there was delayed until 30 June after polling officials went on strike due to unpaid allowances. At least sixteen electoral officials were arrested, including NCD election manager Terrence Hetinu, who was found with US$57,000 in cash stored in his car, while NCD assistant returning officer Roselyn Tobogani was arrested after officials were found smuggling ballot papers out of the provincial election office.

Voting in Chimbu Province, Hela Province and Western Highlands Province failed to begin on schedule on 26 June due to issues with the common roll and disputes over numbers of ballot papers, while voting in Eastern Highlands Province only commenced on a limited basis amidst reports that "thousands of students" had been left off the electoral roll.

Electoral Commissioner Patilias Gamato obtained a court order against blogger Martyn Namorong, restricting him from sharing defamatory statements against the commissioner. This came after Gamato received criticism which compared him and his surname to a tomato.

== Results ==
No women were elected, making Papua New Guinea one of only three or four countries in the world (as of 1 February 2019) to have no women in the legislature.

Party	First preference votes	%	Seats
People's National Congress	1,039,940	13.16	28
National Alliance Party	484,300	6.13	15
Triumph Heritage Empowerment Rural Party	323,951	4.10	4
Pangu Pati	322,049	4.08	9
United Resources Party	310,282	3.93	10
People's Progress Party	273,839	3.46	5
Papua New Guinea Party	216,527	2.74	5
National Party	186,279	2.36	3
People's Party	138,395	1.75	2
Social Democratic Party	129,266	1.64	2
People's Labour Party	127,989	1.62	2
Grassroots United Front Party	124,223	1.57	0
United Party	111,786	1.41	1
PNG One Nation Party	103,515	1.31	1
Christian Democratic Party	100,731	1.27	1
People's Democratic Movement	100,547	1.27	1
Coalition for Reform Party	99,011	1.25	1
People's Movement for Change	74,747	0.95	1
People's Action Party	70,365	0.89	0
Trust PNG Party	66,513	0.84	0
New Generation Party	65,662	0.83	0
Melanesian Alliance Party	63,737	0.81	1
PNG Country Party	53,823	0.68	1
Model Nation Party	49,641	0.63	0
PNG Youths Party	41,017	0.52	0
Our Development Party	35,186	0.45	1
PNG Socialist Party	34,791	0.44	0
Papua New Guinea Constitutional Democratic Party	28,702	0.36	0
Papua New Guinea First Party	28,323	0.36	0
Paradise Kingdom Party	23,239	0.29	0
SOM Pioneer Party	22,813	0.29	0
Nation's Interest Party	20,419	0.26	0
Melanesian Liberal Party	16,429	0.21	1
People's Freedom Party	14,436	0.18	0
PNG Destiny Party	7,495	0.09	0
Papua New Guinea Greens	7,291	0.09	0
Star Alliance Party	6,502	0.08	0
Mapai Levites Party	6,385	0.08	0
National Conservative Party	2,773	0.04	0
Wantok In Godly Services Party	2,435	0.03	0
People's Resources Awareness Party	496	0.01	0
Republican Party	101	0.00	0
Independents	2,967,067	37.54	14
Unavailable (Note: These results omit the figures for Central Bougainville (where a recount took place) and Henganofi)			2
Total	7,903,018	100.00	111
Valid votes	7,903,018	98.19	
Invalid/blank votes	145,760	1.81	
Total votes	8,048,778	100.00	
Registered voters/turnout	9,959,120	80.82	
Source: Wood

== See also ==
- Members of the National Parliament of Papua New Guinea, 2017–2022
- Women in the National Parliament of Papua New Guinea
