= Peter Iwei =

Papua New Guinea politician (born 1965)

Peter Iwei (born 26 November 1965) is a Papua New Guinea politician. He was a member of the National Parliament of Papua New Guinea from 2007 to 2012, representing the electorate of Telefomin Open.

Iwei first contested the Telefomin seat at the 2002 election on behalf of the United Party, but was defeated by Pangu Party candidate Atimeng Buhupe. He contested the seat for a second time at the 2007 election as the candidate of the People's Democratic Movement, narrowly defeating Papua New Guinea Party candidate Steve Hoap and pushing incumbent MP Buhupe into third place.

He was defeated by Solan Mirisim at the 2012 election.
