= Amkat Mai =

Papua New Guinean politician (1962–2021)

Amkat Mai (1 January 1962 – 9 November 2021) was a Papua New Guinean politician. He was elected to the National Parliament of Papua New Guinea at the 2012 election as Governor of West Sepik Province, lost office on 4 October 2013 when his election was declared void by the National Court of Papua New Guinea, and returned to Parliament when he won a subsequent by-election for his seat in August 2015. He was variously a member of the Triumph Heritage Empowerment Party (2012), Papua New Guinea Party (2012) and National Alliance Party (2012–2021).

Mai was an educationist in the Telefomin district prior to entering politics. He won the West Sepik governorship at the 2012 election as an endorsed Triumph Heritage Empowerment Party candidate, but announced his intention to shift to the Papua New Guinea Party prior to the conclusion of counting; his shift sparked criticism from the Registrar of Political Parties, who delayed recognising the move until after a government was formed. He criticised a ban on foreign journalists entering Papua New Guinea to cover issues with the Australian-run Manus Regional Processing Centre, but welcomed the centre's reopening, suggesting that Australia should provide assistance with surveillance and border monitoring capabilities in exchange. In November 2012, he switched parties for a second time and crossed from the opposition to the government, leaving the Papua New Guinea Party and joining the National Alliance Party.

On 4 October 2013, the National Court declared Mai's election to have been null and void after ruling in favour of a legal challenge from two losing candidates and previous governors, Simon Solo and John Tekwie, on the basis that there had been illegal practices during the election, including underage children voting, double voting and multiple voting. Mai appealed the decision to the Supreme Court of Papua New Guinea, which upheld the National Court's decision in March 2015, ruling that a by-election needed to be held. Mai was re-elected with an absolute majority of votes at the resulting August 2015 by-election. He has supported a free trade zone around the PNG-Indonesia border to provide economic benefits for the Vanimo area, argued that Papua New Guinea should set up more police border posts to protect sovereignty and deter illegal activities, and called for the development of the Wewak port to international standards. In December 2016, he signed a deal with two Chinese companies to establish two large industrial parks in West Sepik Province.

Mai died on 9 November 2021, aged 59.

National Parliament of Papua New Guinea
Preceded by Simon Solo	Governor of West Sepik Province; 2012–2013; 2015–2021	Vacant
