= 2007 Papua New Guinean general election =

- 30 June–14 July 2007
Party	Leader	Seats	+/–
NAP	Michael Somare	27	+8
PAP	Gabriel Kapris	7	+2
PNG Party	Mekere Morauta	7	New
Pangu Pati	Chris Haiveta	5	−1
PDM	Paias Wingti	5	−8
URP	Sam Akoitai	5	New
NGP	Bart Philemon	4	New
PNC		4	+2
PPP	Byron Chan	4	−4
RDP	Moses Maladina	4	New
National Party		3	0
PLP	Ekis Ropenu	3	−1
Country Party	Jamie Maxtone-Graham	2	New
United Party	Bire Kimisopa	2	−1
MLP	Allan Marat	2	New
People's Party	Peter Ipatas	2	New
PFP	Luther Wenge	1	−1
MAP	Carol Kidu	1	−2
Independents	–	21	+4
This lists parties that won seats. See the complete results below.
Prime Minister of Papua New Guinea before	Prime Minister of Papua New Guinea after
Michael Somare; NAP	Michael Somare; NAP

General elections were held in Papua New Guinea from 30 June 2007 to 14 July 2007.

For the first time, the election did not use first past the post (which has in the past resulted in a very volatile political system, with the election of a candidate being largely a matter of chance due to the large number of candidates), but rather Limited Preferential Voting, in which voters number their three most preferred candidates. PNG Police reported three deaths caused by election-related violence during the election period, a large decrease in the 100 deaths which occurred during the 2002 elections. 11,000 police officers and soldiers were deployed throughout the country to police the elections and keep the peace.

Originally scheduled to end on 10 July, it was decided that the elections would be extended by five days due to delays in transporting ballot boxes caused by bad weather.

== Results ==
ABC Radio Australia reported that nearly four million votes were cast out of Papua New Guinea's population of about six million.

Early results on 15 July indicated that incumbent Prime Minister Sir Michael Somare's National Alliance Party was picking up more seats than other parties of the National Parliament of Papua New Guinea's 109 seats. Final results were largely completed by 6 August, the deadline for the return of writs. Counting in two seats was extended for a few days due to legal challenges halting the counting process. The previous deadline was 30 July, but this was extended due to delays caused by bad weather and disruption of counting by some candidates and scrutineers.

In addition to the seats won by the National Alliance Party directly, thirteen independents joined the party after the election. Together with its coalition partners (which include the People's Action Party, the United Resources Party, the Pangu Pati, the National Party, the Melanesian Liberal Party and the Melanesian Alliance Party) the National Alliance Party had the support of a substantial majority of the newly elected Members of Parliament.

A hundred women stood as candidates. Only one, Dame Carol Kidu, was elected, for the Port Moresby South constituency.

Party	Seats
National Alliance Party	27
People's Action Party	7
Papua New Guinea Party	7
Pangu Pati	5
People's Democratic Movement	5
United Resources Party	5
New Generation Party	4
People's National Congress	4
People's Progress Party	4
Rural Development Party	4
National Party	3
People's Labour Party	3
PNG Country Party	2
United Party	2
Melanesian Liberal Party	2
People's Party	2
People's First Party	1
Melanesian Alliance Party	1
Independents	21
Total	109
Source: IPU

=== By province ===
==== Central Province ====
Electorate	Previous member (party)	2007 winner (party)
Central Provincial	Alphonse Moroi (Independent)	Alphonse Moroi (RDP)
Abau Open	Puka Temu (NA)	Puka Temu (NA)
Goilala Open	Fabian Inne (PLP)	Mathew Poia (NA)
Kairuku-Hiri Open	Moi Avei (MA)	Paru Aihi (PNGP)
Rigo Open	Anderson Vele (Independent)	Ano Pala (NA)

==== Eastern Highlands Province ====
Electorate	Previous member (party)	2007 winner (party)
Eastern Highlands Provincial	Malcolm 'Kela' Smith (Independent)	Malcolm 'Kela' Smith (Independent)
Daulo Open	Ben Kiagi (UP)	Kondo Patrick (PLP)
Goroka Open	Bire Kimisopa (UP)	Thompson Harokaqveh (PANGU)
Henganofi Open	Tota Bun (CDP)	Ferao Orimyo (PNGP)
Kainantu Open	Yuntuvi Bao (PAP)	Sai Beseo (PP)
Lufa Open	Yawa Silupa (NA)	Yawa Silupa (NA)
Obura-Wonenara Open	John Koigiri (PNC)	John Boito (PDM)
Okapa Open	Tom Amukele (NA)	Bonny Oveyara (PPP)
Unggai-Bena Open	Benny Allan (URP)	Benny Allan (URP)

==== East New Britain Province ====
Electorate	Previous member (party)	2007 winner (party)
East New Britain Provincial	Leo Dion (NA)	Leo Dion (NA)
Gazelle Open	Sinai Brown (NA)	Malakai Tabar (MLP)
Kokopo Open	Rabbie Namaliu (PANGU)	Patrick Tammur (Independent)
Pomio Open	Paul Tiensten (PPP)	Paul Tiensten (NA)
Rabaul Open	Allan Marat (PPP)	Allan Marat (MLP)

==== East Sepik Province ====
Electorate	Previous member (party)	2007 winner (party)
East Sepik Provincial	Michael Somare (NA)	Michael Somare (NA)
Ambunti-Dreikikir Open	Tony Aimo (PAP)	Tony Aimo (PAP)
Angoram Open	Arthur Somare (NA)	Arthur Somare (NA)
Maprik Open	Gabriel Kapris (PAP)	Gabriel Kapris (PAP)
Wewak Open	Kimson Kare (PNC)	Jim Simatab (Independent)
Wosera-Gaui Open	Gallus Yumbui (PMC) (suspended from office)	Ronald Asik (PAP)
Yangoru-Saussia Open	Peter Waranaka (NA)	Peter Waranaka (NA)

==== Enga Province ====
Electorate	Previous member (party)	2007 winner (party)
Enga Provincial	Peter Ipatas (PP)	Peter Ipatas (PP)
Kandep Open	Don Polye (NA)	Don Polye (NA)
Kompiam-Ambum Open	Dickson Maki (PP)	John Pundari (NAP)
Lagaip-Porgera Open	Kappa Yarka (PP)	Philip Kikala (NA)
Wabag Open	Sam Abal (NA)	Sam Abal (NA)
Wapenamanda Open	Miki Kaeok (NA)	Miki Kaeok (NA)

==== Gulf Province ====
Electorate	Previous member (party)	2007 winner (party)
Gulf Provincial	Chris Haiveta (Independent)	Havila Kavo (PNC)
Kerema Open	Ekis Ropenu (PLP)	Pitom Bombom (Independent)
Kikori Open	Mark Maipakai (NA)	Mark Maipakai (NA)

==== Madang Province ====
Electorate	Previous member (party)	2007 winner (party)
Madang Provincial	Peter Barter (NA) (retired)	Arnold Amet (NA)
Bogia Open	John Hickey (NA)	John Hickey (NA)
Madang Open	Alois Kingsley (Independent) (contested Madang Provincial seat in 2007 election)	Buka Malai (Independent)
Middle Ramu Open	Ben Semri (PAP)	Ben Semri (PAP)
Rai Coast Open	James Yali (Independent)	James Yali (Independent) (election nullified on 13 August 2007 — see James Yali affair) 10–16 November 2007 by-election: Niuro Toko Sapia (elected as independent, then joined NA)
Sumkar Open	Mathew Gubag (Independent)	Ken Fairweather (Independent)
Usino-Bundi Open	Peter Yama (PLP) (contested Madang Provincial seat in 2007 election)	Samson Kuli (PP)

==== Manus Province ====
Electorate	Previous member (party)	2007 winner (party)
Manus Provincial	Jacob Jumogot (PDM)	Michael Sapau (RDP)
Manus Open	Charlie Benjamin (APP) (dismissed from office)	Job Pomat (PNC)

==== Milne Bay Province ====
Electorate	Previous member (party)	2007 winner (party)
Milne Bay Provincial	Tim Neville (Independent)	John Luke Crittin (Independent)
Alotau Open	Isaac Taitibe (Independent)	Charles Abel (Independent)
Esa'ala Open	Moses Maladina (RDP)	Moses Maladina (RDP)
Kiriwina-Goodenough Open	Brian Pulayasi (PNC)	Jack Cameron (PDM)
Samarai-Murua Open	Gordon Wesley (Independent)	Gordon Wesley (Independent)

==== Morobe Province ====
Electorate	Previous member (party)	2007 winner (party)
Morobe Provincial	Luther Wenge (PFP)	Luther Wenge (PFP)
Bulolo Open	John Muingnepe (PDM)	Sam Basil (PPP)
Finschhafen Open	Guao Zurenouc (Independent)	Theo Zurenouc (elected as Independent then joined PPP)
Huon Gulf Open	Sasa Zibe (NA)	Sasa Zibe (NA)
Kabwum Open	Bob Dadae (UP)	Bob Dadae (UP)
Lae Open	Bart Philemon (NA)	Bart Philemon (NGP)
Markham Open	Andrew Baing (PPP) (dismissed from office)	Koni Iguan (PLP)
Menyamya Open	Teta Geoka (NA)	Benjamin Philip (RDP)
Nawae Open	Wesley Zurenuc (NA)	Timothy Bonga (Independent)
Tewai-Siassi Open	Mao Zeming (PDM)	Vincent Michaels (Independent)

==== National Capital District ====
Electorate	Previous member (party)	2007 winner (party)
National Capital District Provincial	Wari Vele (NA)	Powes Parkop (Independent)
Moresby North-East Open	Casper Wollom (NA)	Andrew Mald (Independent)
Moresby North-West Open	Mekere Morauta (PNGP)	Mekere Morauta (PNGP)
Moresby South Open	Carol Kidu (MA)	Carol Kidu (MA)

==== New Ireland Province ====
Electorate	Previous member (party)	2007 winner (party)
New Ireland Provincial	Ian Ling-Stuckey (PANGU)	Julius Chan (PPP)
Kavieng Open	Martin Aini (PANGU)	Martin Aini (PANGU)
Namatanai Open	Byron Chan (PPP)	Byron Chan (PPP)

==== North Solomons (Bougainville) Province ====
Electorate	Previous member (party)	2007 winner (party)
Bougainville Provincial	Leo Hanette (NA)	Fidelis Semoso (Independent)
Central Bougainville Open	Samuel Akoitai (URP)	Jimmy Miringtoro (PDM)
North Bougainville Open	James Togel (NA)	Michael Ogio (PDM)
South Bougainville Open	Michael Laimo (NA)	Michael Laimo (NA)

==== Oro (Northern) Province ====
Electorate	Previous member (party)	2007 winner (party)
Northern Provincial	Bani Hoivo (PLP)	Suckling Tamanabae (UP)
Ijivitari Open	Cecilking Doruba (PANGU)	David Arore (Independent)
Sohe Open	Peter Oresi (PNC) (contested Northern Provincial seat in 2007 election)	Anthony Nene (PNC)

==== Simbu (Chimbu) Province ====
Electorate	Previous member (party)	2007 winner (party)
Simbu Provincial	Peter Launa (URP)	John Garia (PNGP)
Chuave Open	Jim Nomane (PCP)	Jim Nomane (PCP)
Gumine Open	Nick Kuman (PNC)	Lucas Dekena (NA)
Karimui-Nomane Open	Posi Menai (PAP)	Posi Menai (PAP)
Kerowagi Open	Alphonse Willie (NA)	Guma Wau (URP)
Kundiawa Open	Mathew Siune (PNGP)	Joe Mek Teine (PNGNP)
Sinasina-Yonggamugl Open	Jeffrey Nape (NA)	Jeffrey Nape (NA)

==== Southern Highlands Province ====
Electorate	Previous member (party)	2007 winner (party)
Southern Highlands Provincial	Nipa Yawari (PCP)	Anderson Agiru (URP)
Ialibu-Pangia Open	Peter O'Neill (PNC)	Peter O'Neill (PNC)
Imbonggu Open	Timothy Tala (NA)	Francis Awesa (PNGP)
Kagua-Erave Open	David Basua (NA)	James Lagea (elected as PNGCP then joined NA)
Komo-Margarima Open	Balus Libe (PLP)	Francis Potape (NGP)
Koroba-Lake Kopiago Open	John Kekeno (PAP)	John Kekeno (PAP)
Mendi Open	Michael Nali (PPP) (contested Southern Highlands Provincial seat in 2007 election)	Isaac Joseph (NGP)
Nipa-Kutubu Open	Robert Kopaol (Independent)	Philemon Embel (PANGU)
Tari Open	Tom Tomiape (RDP)	James Marape (NA)

==== Sandaun (West Sepik) Province ====
Electorate	Previous member (party)	2007 winner (party)
West Sepik Provincial	Carlos Yuni (Independent)	Simon Solo (NA)
Aitape-Lumi Open	Patrick Pruaitch (NA)	Patrick Pruaitch (NA)
Nuku Open	Andrew Kumbakor (PANGU)	Andrew Kumbakor (PANGU)
Telefomin Open	Atimeng Buhupe (NA)	Peter Iwei (PDM)
Vanimo-Green River Open	Philip Inou (PAP)	Belden Namah (NA)

==== Western Province ====
Electorate	Previous member (party)	2007 winner (party)
Western Provincial	Bob Danaya (PNGLP)	Bob Danaya (PNGLP)
Middle Fly Open	Roy Biyama (URP)	Roy Biyama (URP)
North Fly Open	Martin Tabi (PNC)	Boka Kondra (elected as Independent then joined PNC)
South Fly Open	Conrad Haoda (PNC)	Sali Subam (NA)

==== Western Highlands Province ====
Electorate	Previous member (party)	2007 winner (party)
Western Highlands Provincial	Paias Wingti (PDM)	Tom Olga (Independent)
Angalimp-South Wahgi Open	Jamie Maxtone-Graham (PCP)	Jamie Maxtone-Graham (PCP)
Baiyer-Mul Open	Kuri Kingal (PDM)	Sani Rambi (NA)
Dei Open	Melchior Pep (RDP)	Puri Ruing (PNGP)
Hagen Open	William Duma (URP)	William Duma (URP)
Jimi Open	Francis Kunai (PNP)	Waka Goi (PNGP)
North Wahgi Open	Michael Mas Kal (PNP)	Benjamin Mul (PNGP)
Tambul-Nebilyer Open	Mark Anis (PDM)	Benjamin Poponawa (elected as Independent then joined NA)

==== West New Britain Province ====
Electorate	Previous member (party)	2007 winner (party)
West New Britain Provincial	Clement Nakmai (PHP)	Peter Humphreys (NA)
Kandrian-Gloucester Open	David Sui (PNC)	Tony Puana (NGP)
Talasea Open	John Vulupundi (Independent)	Francis Marus (PANGU)

== Aftermath ==
On Monday 13 August 2007, the first sitting of Parliament after the election took place. Jeffrey Nape was re-elected as Speaker of the House, and Sir Michael Somare was once again elected to be the country's Prime Minister, winning 86 votes in the 109-seat Parliament.

=== James Yali affair ===
In January 2006, James Yali, governor of Madang Province and Member of Parliament for Rai Coast Open electorate, was convicted of raping his sister-in-law and sentenced to 12 years' imprisonment. In May 2007 he allegedly suffered a stroke and was transferred from Beon jail to hospital and placed under guard. A group of supporters and relatives then reportedly retrieved him from hospital by force and escorted him to the office of the Electoral Commission, where he completed an application to stand as an independent candidate for his previously held seat of Rai Coast Open. Despite a recent constitutional amendment that disallows anyone convicted of an indictable offence from running for office, the Electoral Commission accepted his candidacy on the basis that his legal appeal was still underway. This decision later attracted considerable criticism. He remained in hospital until 7 July, conducting his campaign from his hospital bed.

In the 2007 general election, Yali won the Rai Coast Open seat from a field of 28 candidates. His level of support, despite being imprisoned, was widely attributed to fear of his reputation for sorcery.

On 10 August, the Supreme Court quashed Yali's appeal, nullifying his election. The Electoral Commission said that a by-election for Rai Coast Open would be held within three months. The court was widely criticised for having deliberated on the case for a year, given that a by-election would have been avoided had the court come to a decision before the election.

The by-election was held from 10–16 November 2007. His brother, John Tuna Yali, contested the election and stated that he was confident he would win. A total of 21 candidates contested the by-election. The election may have been delayed in some areas for a few days due to weather problems, but by 20 November 2007 voting had been completed in most areas. For the first time, the ballots were counted electronically; writs were returned on 7 December 2007. The by-election was won by Kiap Niuro Toko Sapia with 6,961 votes, while Henry Baiyema was runner-up with 4,503 votes. Sapia contested the election as an independent after having contested the general election as a PNG Country Party candidate; he announced he would join the National Alliance Party.
