= Lucas Dekena =

Papua New Guinean politician

Lucas Dawa Dekena (born 19 October 1967) is a Papua New Guinean politician. He was a member of the National Parliament of Papua New Guinea from 2007 to 2013, representing the electorate of Gumine Open, initially for the National Alliance Party but switching to the Papua New Guinea Party after the 2011 defeat of the Somare government. He was Minister for Lands and Physical Planning under both Michael Somare and Peter O'Neill from 2010 to 2012. His name is spelled in various ways; he is also sometimes referred to as Dawa Lucas.

Dekena, a computer programmer prior to entering politics, was elected for the National Alliance Party at the 2007 election. He was appointed as Minister for Lands and Physical Planning under Michael Somare in August 2010. He was one of several ministers to switch support to Peter O'Neill when he successfully ousted Somare in August 2011, and retained his portfolio in the new O'Neill government. Dekena was re-elected at the 2012 election for the Papua New Guinea Party, after which he went into opposition and served as Shadow Minister for Lands and Physical Planning. On 15 January 2013, Nick Kuman, who Dekena had defeated in 2007, successfully challenged Dekena's re-election in the National Court on the grounds of illegal marking of ballot papers; the court unseated Dekena and after a recount that November declared Kuman to have been rightfully elected. Dekena was denied leave to appeal to appeal to the Supreme Court.

National Parliament of Papua New Guinea
Preceded by Nick Kuman	Member for Gumine Open; 2007–2013	Succeeded by Nick Kuman
