= Rural Development Party =

- Founder: Moses Maladina
- Founded: 2006
- Dissolved: 2015
- Ideology: Agrarianism

The Rural Development Party was a political party in Papua New Guinea.

It was founded in November 2006 by Esa’ala MP Moses Maladina, who became the party's first leader. In May 2007, media reports suggested that some members were unhappy with a perceived lack of party financial support for their campaigns.

It was reported to have won three out of 109 seats at the 2007 general elections: Maladina, Alphonse Moroi (Central Provincial) and Benjamin Philip (Menyamya Open). A fourth, Manus Provincial MP Michael Sapau, had been reported as a party candidate during the campaign, but denied any association upon his election and claimed to be an independent. The party initially supported the government of Michael Somare, with Maladina being promoted to the Ministry as Minister of State for Constitutional Affairs in July 2010; the party then had a position in the Peter O'Neill government from August 2011.

Moroi had joined the National Alliance Party by late 2008. By the 2012 election, Maladina and Philip had defected to the governing People's National Congress, with the former serving as Leader of Government Business. In April 2012, Speaker Jeffrey Nape - formerly of the Triumph Heritage Empowerment Party - was appointed as the new Rural Development Party leader for the election.

The party won no seats at the 2012 election and was deregistered in 2015.
