= James Gau =

James Gau Gelak (born 19 September 1957) is a Papua New Guinean politician. He was a member of the National Parliament of Papua New Guinea from 2010 to 2017, representing the electorate of Rai Coast Open for the National Alliance Party (2010-2012) and Triumph Heritage Empowerment Party (2012-2017). He was also Governor of Madang Province from January 2011 until the 2012 election.

Gau is the son of Gau Yabile, a former member of the Madang Provincial Assembly during the 1970s and 1980s. He was educated at Male Primary School, Tusbab High School and Lae Technical College. He was a civil engineering technical officer for the Department of Works prior to entering politics.

He was elected to the National Parliament as a National Alliance candidate at a May 2010 by-election following the death of his predecessor Niuro Toko Sapia. He has been a supporter of the Ramu nickel mine project, declaring that it "must be allowed to go ahead" and regularly criticising mine opponents. In January 2011, he was elected Governor of Madang Province to serve out the remainder of the term of previous Governor Arnold Amet, who had been appointed Attorney-General. He supported Peter O'Neill's August 2011 ouster of Michael Somare as Prime Minister, subsequently declaring that the new government was a "divine intervention".

In January 2012, he was among a number of National Alliance MPs to switch to the new Triumph Heritage Empowerment Party. Gau subsequently became the party's deputy leader for the Momase Region. He was re-elected in his Rai Coast seat as a Triumph Heritage Empowerment candidate at the 2012 election, having opted not to recontest the permanent governorship. He moved to the crossbenches following Prime Minister O'Neill's sacking of party leader Don Polye in early 2014, and moved to the opposition in November 2014. In February 2015, he was named Shadow Minister for Works and Transport by now Opposition Leader Polye. He serves as chairman of the Inter-Government Relations Referral Committee, deputy chairman of the Communications Referral Committee, and as a member of the Pensions and Retirement Benefits Permanent Committee.

He lost his seat to Peter Sapia, the son of his predecessor as MP for Rai Coast, at the 2017 election.

National Parliament of Papua New Guinea
Preceded by Niuro Toko Sapia	Member for Rai Coast Open; 2010–2017	Succeeded by Peter Sapia
