= People's Labour Party (Papua New Guinea) =

- President: Benedict Simanjuang
- Secretary: Charles Loke
- Founder: Peter Yama
- Founded: 2001
- Ideology: Christian democracy
- National Parliament: 1 / 118

The People's Labour Party is a political party in Papua New Guinea.

== History ==
It was founded in April 2001 by Madang businessman and former MP Peter Yama, who sought a return to politics after having lost his seat at the 1997 election. He pledged that, if the party formed the next government, it would give ten percent of the national budget to churches to assist young people, stating that "PNG proclaimed itself to be a Christian country but the Government had not made that a reality." He also pledged to fight corruption and to investigate a number of past financial deals involving the national government.

The party won four seats at the 2002 election: Yama (Usino-Bundi Open), Yuntavi Bao (Kainantu Open), Miki Kaeok (Wapenamanda Open) and Ekis Ropenu (Kerema Open). It supported Michael Somare for Prime Minister and was to be allocated one ministry in his government, but Yama stated that he would step aside due to a misconduct investigation. Three more MPs were reported to have joined the party in December 2002: Cecilking Doruba (sole MP for the PNG First Party), Gordon Wesley (sole MP for the One People Party) and independent Fabian Ine, although they faced issues with anti-floor crossing laws. The misconduct proceedings against Yama were quashed in March 2003.

The party won an additional seat at the Southern Highlands supplementary election in May 2003, with the election of Balus Libe in Komo-Magarina Open. Yama claimed at that time that with further defections the party had a total of 10 MPs Yama was promoted to the ministry in August 2003 as Minister for Labour and Industrial Relations, but was sacked in November. Bao also served as a minister in Somare's government, but was himself sacked in January 2004 after the party voted against an attempted constitutional amendment to curb no-confidence votes.

Following their sacking, the party moved to the opposition and attempted to oust the Somare government. In May 2004, Yama was briefly recognised as Leader of the Opposition when Speaker Jeffrey Nape attempted to prevent Peter O'Neill from taking the office. However, in July, the party announced that Repenu had replaced Yama as leader, and that the party would again support the government. The party again reversed later in the term, with Yama regaining the leadership and the party pledging to strongly oppose the re-election of the Somare government by the time of the 2007 election.

The party won two seats at the 2007 election: Patrick Kondo in Daulo Open and Koni Iguan in Markham Open, while Yama was defeated in a bid for Governor of Madang Province. Iguan succeeded Yama as party leader. However, Iguan crossed to the Papua New Guinea Party in January 2011. Yama attempted to re-enter parliament at the 2012 election but was unsuccessful, and was again defeated in a 2013 by-election.

The party was registered to contest the 2017 election, and won two seats in the National Parliament. As of May 2019, the party has 1 seat in the National Parliament.
