= Coalition for Reform Party =

- Leader: Joseph Lelang
- President: Wai Kitt
- Secretary: Philemon Was Korowi
- Founded: March 2012
- National Parliament: 0 / 111

Website
- Facebook Page

The Coalition for Reform Party is a political party in Papua New Guinea.

It was established in March 2012 by Joseph Lelang, then the former Secretary for National Planning and Monitoring. It won two seats at the 2012 election: Lelang won Kandrian-Glouster Open, while Sasindran Muthuvel became the first Indian-born MP in Papua New Guinea in winning West New Britain Provincial. The party supported Belden Namah against Prime Minister Peter O'Neill and subsequently went into opposition. Muthevel resigned from the party and crossed to the governing People's National Congress in March 2013, while Lelang remains a member.

As of September 2019, Lelang had left the party and joined the National Alliance.
