= Benjamin Poponawa =

Papua New Guinea politician

Benjamin Poponawa (born 28 January 1960) is a Papua New Guinea politician. He has been a member of the National Parliament of Papua New Guinea since July 2007, representing the electorate of Tambul-Nebilyer Open. He was initially elected as an independent, but immediately joined the then-governing National Alliance upon his election.

Poponawa first contested the 2002 general election, but was defeated by People's Democratic Movement candidate Mark Anis. He again contested the seat as an independent at the 2007 general election, and was successful despite having trailed for most of the count. He immediately announced his intention to join the governing National Alliance. He was subsequently named as Parliamentary Secretary for Treasury and Finance by Prime Minister Michael Somare.

In January 2012, he joined Don Polye's new Triumph Heritage Empowerment Rural Party. He left the party in May 2014.
