= Star Alliance Party =

- President: John Arabel
- Secretary: Hone Taylor
- National Parliament: 0 / 111

Star Alliance Party is a political party in Papua New Guinea.

It first applied for party registration in 2006, and contested the 2007 election, endorsing 72 candidates but winning no seats.

It won one seat at the 2012 election, with the election of Mehrra Kipefa in Obura-Wonenara Open. The party was reported to have crossed from the government into opposition in July 2016 and supported a no-confidence vote in Prime Minister Peter O'Neill; however, Kipefa crossed to the United Resources Party by November 2016, leaving the party once again unrepresented in parliament.
