= Mehrra Minne Kipefa =

Papua New Guinean politician

Mehrra Minne Kipefa (born 15 December 1981) is a Papua New Guinean politician. He has been a member of the National Parliament of Papua New Guinea since 2012, representing the electorate of Obura-Wonenara Open. He was first elected as the sole MP of the Star Alliance Party, but had crossed to the United Resources Party by 2016.

He graduated from the University of Papua New Guinea as an environmental chemist in 2013. Prior to his election, Kipefa had been an analytical industrial chemist for five years. He was elected to the National Parliament at the 2012 election, defeating John Boito. He was a supporter of the O'Neill government until July 2016, when he crossed the floor and joined the opposition.

Kipefa is the chairman of the Foreign Relations and Trade Referral Committee and a member of the Health and Family Welfare Referral Committee, the Culture and Tourism Committee, and the Public Sector Reform and Service Delivery Special Committee.

National Parliament of Papua New Guinea
Preceded by John Boito	Member for Obura-Wonenara Open; 2012-present	Incumbent
