= People's Action Party (Papua New Guinea) =

- President: Mark Sarong
- Secretary: Simon Bole
- Founder: Ted Diro
- Founded: 1987
- Political position: Centre-right
- National Parliament: 0 / 111

The People's Action Party is a right-of-centre political party in Papua New Guinea.

It was founded prior to the 1987 election by former Leader of the Opposition Ted Diro.

At the 2002 election, the party won 5 out of 109 seats in total (with 5% of the vote in total). At the 2007 election, the party won 6 seats. It supported the government of Prime Minister Michael Somare.

In October 2011, four PAP MPs, including then-leader Gabriel Kapris, defected to the Papua New Guinea Party. The party won no seats at the 2012 election. In July 2012, the party was reported to have "disintegrated" following the Kapris defection.

The party has not received any media coverage since 2012; however, it had registered to contest the 2017 election.
