= Indigenous People's Party =

Political party in Papua New Guinea

The Indigenous People's Party is a political party in Papua New Guinea.

It was founded in 2011 by former Sandaun Province Governor John Tekwie, although he had previously touted creating a party of the same name as early as 2006. He described the party as having a "mission to represent and deal with all issues affecting the lives of indigenous people, especially those in the border provinces of PNG". The party's policies included "ownership and wealth creation for resource owners, creation of an indigenous empowerment financial system, higher and basic education, gender empowerment, indigenous business development [and] village development". It also pledged to create a new "Border Region" in addition to the existing formal regions of Papua New Guinea and to institute a "Ministry of Spiritual Development". The party's deputy leader was Misty Baloiloi, a former vice-chancellor of the Papua New Guinea University of Technology, while Bougainville separatist leader Sam Kauona was a party member.

The party won one seat at the 2012 election, with Loujaya Toni winning in Lae Open. Toni subsequently crossed to the governing People's National Congress, leaving the party unrepresented in parliament. Almost nothing was heard of the party after the 2012 election, although it had remained formally registered to contest the 2017 election.
