= Peter Humphreys =

Papua New Guinea politician

Peter Humphreys is a Papua New Guinean politician. He was the Governor of West New Britain Province and the member for West New Britain Provincial in the National Parliament of Papua New Guinea from 2007 to 2012.

Humphreys was raised in the Talasea area, the son of English-born plantation manager and former Talasea MP Harry Humphreys. He worked as a businessman before entering politics. He contested the 2007 general election for the governing National Alliance, and faced a difficult race against independent candidate and former Air Niugini chairman Sir Joe Tauvasa and incumbent Governor Clement Nakmai. He trailed Tauvasa on primary votes, but won the seat after the final distribution of preferences. The result enraged some of Tauvasa's supporters, who responded with two days of rioting in the Hoskins area. Humphreys has stated an intention to increase accountability and transparency in the provincial government and to improve basic services in previously neglected areas of the province.

In January 2012, he joined Don Polye's new Triumph Heritage Empowerment Rural Party.

He was defeated by Sasindran Muthuvel at the 2012 election.
