= Sani Rambi =

Papua New Guinea politician

Sani Rambi (born 3 November 1958) is a Papua New Guinea politician. He was a member of the National Parliament of Papua New Guinea since from 2007 to 2012, representing the Baiyer-Mul Open electorate.

Rambi, a businessman from Mount Hagen, defeated People's Democratic Movement MP Kuri Kingal, who had been the member for the seat since 2002. He was appointed Minister for Internal Security after the election by Prime Minister Michael Somare.

He was defeated by Koi Trape at the 2012 election.
