= PNG Conservative Party =

- Founded: 2007
- Dissolved: 2015
- Ideology: Conservatism

The PNG Conservative Party was a political party in Papua New Guinea.

It was established in January 2007 by Southern Highlands Governor Hami Yawari. It pledged to reduce all forms of taxes, implement free education from elementary level to university, and give K5 million each year to all 89 districts. In June 2007, Morobe Province candidates publicly complained that the party had failed to pay for campaign expenses.

Yawari was defeated at the 2007 election, although new candidate James Lagea was elected in Kagua-Erave Open. Lagea defected to the National Alliance Party upon his election.

The party remained formally registered for the 2012 election, but won no seats. It was deregistered in 2015.
