= Tom Olga =

Tom Olga (born 16 December 1975) is a Papua New Guinea politician. He was the independent Governor of Western Highlands Province in the National Parliament of Papua New Guinea from 2007 to 2012.

Olga, who comes from the Mul-Baiyer area, was a student leader at the University of Papua New Guinea during protests against government privatisation and land mobilisation policies in 2001 in which four students were killed in a police crackdown. He cited this as his reason for running for parliament when, in 2007, he challenged former Prime Minister Paias Wingti in his seat of Western Highlands Provincial. He was supported in his campaign by the Millennium Pack 2000, a group of provincial leaders supporting pro-development and anti-corruption initiatives, and more than thirty local councillors.

Olga campaigned on a platform of fighting government corruption and mismanagement and stemming the exploitation of the country's resources. He also made an issue of the need for a new generation of leaders, contrasting his age of 32 with Wingti's advancing years. The result was extremely close, with Wingti leading for most of the count, but ultimately losing to Olga on preferences in the final stage of counting. It was the last electorate to be declared, with Olga being eventually announced as the winner on 6 August. The result was widely considered an upset, with the potential to end Wingti's thirty-year career in national politics. The result enraged some of Wingti's supporters, who retaliated by blocking roads in the region and digging up a major road into the city of Mount Hagen. Wingti subsequently filed a petition challenging the result with the Court of Disputed Returns on 17 August. This challenge has not yet been resolved.

He was sworn in as the provincial governor on 22 August 2007. Olga's first act as governor was to advertise all acting public service positions in the province, including that of the provincial administrator. He also pledged to increase government services to remote areas of the province.

In January 2012, he joined Don Polye's new Triumph Heritage Empowerment Rural Party.

He was defeated in a rematch with Wingti at the 2012 election.
