= Papua New Guinea Constitutional Democratic Party =

The Papua New Guinea Constitutional Democratic Party (PNGCDP) is a former political party in Papua New Guinea.

It was founded in January 2011 by former chief ombudsman, Public Service Commission chairman and police commissioner Ila Geno on an anti-corruption platform. He was supported by anti-corruption advocates John Toguata and Daniel Kassa and former National Court judge Nemo Yalo, while Tobias Thomas served as party secretary.

It won its first seat in August 2011, when accountant Tobias Kulang, an in-law of Geno, won a by-election in the seat of Kundiawa-Gembogl caused by the death of Joe Mek Teine. Kulang was re-elected at the 2012 election, but the party won no other seats. After the election, Kulang as party leader attacked O'Neill for being involved with people who he claimed had been involved in alleged fraud, and vowed to join the opposition to provide public scrutiny of the government's performance.

Kulang continued as an outspoken individual member of the opposition after his re-election, although very little was heard of the party itself thereafter. In October 2013, Geno and Kulang jointly filed a constitutional challenge against a law extending the parliamentary grace period from no-confidence motions. However, the next month, in November 2013, Kulang resigned from the PNGCDP and crossed to the government, joining O'Neill's junior coalition partner, the People's Progress Party.

After a period of inactivity, Geno reactivated the party for the 2017 election. The party was named as part of a proposed "alternative government" of opposition parties should the governing People's National Congress fail to win a majority. The party did not win any seats and is not currently registered as a political party.
