= PNG One Nation Party =

Papua New Guinean political party

- Leader: Peter Numu
- President: Jack A Kugirin
- Secretary: Jonah Kamo
- Founder: Joseph Tonde
- National Parliament: 1 / 111

Website
- Facebook Page

The PNG One Nation Party is a political party in Papua New Guinea.

The party was formed in 2017 by Joseph Tonde.

As of May 2019, the party had one seat in the National Parliament. It is led by Peter Numu, who is its sole MP.
