= Chief Minister of Papua and New Guinea =

The Chief Minister of Papua and New Guinea was the head of the Australian territorial government of Papua and New Guinea from 1973, when Papua New Guinea was granted self-government, to 1975. Prior to self-government and after the end of the military administration of the jointly administered territory following World War II the head of the executive of the territory was the Administrator. After independence in 1975, the post became the Prime Minister of Papua New Guinea. Michael Somare (1936–2021), was the only occupant of the position, serving from 1972 to 1975, and he remained as Prime Minister after independence.
