= United Party (Papua New Guinea) =

- Leader: Rimbink Pato
- President: Chris Kopyoto
- Secretary: Mathew Taso
- Political position: Centre-right
- National Parliament: 1 / 111

The United Party is a political party in Papua New Guinea. As of May 2019, it has one seat in the National Parliament and is led by Minister for Foreign Affairs, Rimbink Pato.

== History ==
There were attempts from 1964 to 1968 to form political parties. A meeting was held in Port Moresby and a Territory Country Party, organised along the lines of the Australian Country Party, was formed in 1967.

The connection between Australian Country Party and political parties in PNG was through the Compass Party (later United Party). Despite talks and media release, the Compass Party was formed in Minj in 1967 by certain expatriate and indigenous Members of the House of Assembly who were aligned with the farmers and planters association, the Highlands Farmers & Settlers Association Incorporated (HFSA). Members of HFSA in Parliament were Ian Downs, Highlands Special (President of HFSA), John Watts (WH Regional), Mike Casey (Kainantu), Sinake Giregire (Goroka) (first indigenous member of HFSA). The prominent national being Giregire and Members from Simbu and EH.

After its formation, Tei Abal (Wabag) was appointed its Leader with Giregire as Deputy. The United went into 1968 Elections and returned as a force against the pro independence, Pangu Party. As the Party was conservative, most of its Members were appointed Ministers and Vice Ministers. The Party went again to the polls in 1972 and returned and with the self-government in 1973, Tei Abal and Sinake Giregire and Paul Langro were on the Constitutional Planning Committee.

The third Party was the Peoples Progress Party (1970) under Julius Chan (Namatanai). At this time, the Australian Country Party sent an officer to PNG to assist the United Party in establishing its working structure. This ACP officer was in Eastern Highlands (Goroka) and so Giregire took on the advantage of the Australian canvassing and organisational assistance to form a PNG version of the Australian Country Party. Using the Constitutional Planning Committee (a faction calling itself the Nationalist Pressure Group - Giregire, Fr. John Momis and John Kaputin) Giregire canvassed support to bring a fourth force with Members from United Party and Pangu Pati to form Country Party which was formally recognized on the floor of Parliament in March 1974. The Country Party had 14 Members under the leadership of Sir Sinake Giregire (MP for Goroka and later Daulo) and Michael Pondros (Manus).

The role of Country Party featured prominently in the Constituent Assembly when it was more or was taking the lead in the Nationalist Pressure Group (Momis, Kaputin and Giregire) who wanted to present the CPC Report as it is to become the Constitution and on one hand Somare and Pangu who wanted amendments such as dropping the Provincial Government system.

This followed on with Melanesian Alliance Party under Fr. John Momis and the Mataungan Association taking a political party status with John Kaputin and Oscar Tammur on floor of Parliament.

Despite the breakup, United Party contested the 1977 Elections and came with a majority of Members but Pangu formed a Coalition with PPP, National Party, Melanesian Alliance and Mataungan against United/Country Party with Michael Somare as Prime Minister.

Country Party, United Party and National Party were seen as a Highlands dominated Party. To break that stronghold Somare appointed Paias Wingti as his Deputy Leader in 1982. Wingti then broke ranks with Pangu and with other Members including from United Party formed Peoples Democratic Movement in 1985.

With the loss of Sir Tei Abal, Leader of United Party in 1987, leadership tussle came into play with Roy Evara, Anton Parao, Paul Torato and others.

Gradually, the fortunes of United Party waned in 1992 and 1997 Elections. In 1997 Elections it had only one MP in Gabia Gagarimambu. In 2002, it had three MP's in Bire Kimisopa (Goroka), Bob Dadae (Kabwum) and Ben Kiagi (Daulo). The party went to the 2007 National Elections under leadership of Hon. Kimisopa but returned with two out of 109 seats in the 2007 General Elections.

At the 2002 elections, the party won 3 seats in the 109-seat national parliament. The party leader for the 2002–2007 term was Bire Kimisopa, member for Goroka Open, in Eastern Highlands province.

In the 2007 elections, the party won 2 seats in parliament. Kimisopa was replaced as party leader on 22 August 2007, having lost his seat. He was replaced as leader by Bob Dadae, member for Kabwum Open in Morobe Province. Dadae crossed to the People's National Congress in May 2012, stating that his people wanted him to be aligned with a major party.

The party won one seat at the 2012 election, with Rimbink Pato winning Wapenamanda Open and assuming the United Party leadership.
