= Prime Minister of Papua New Guinea =

Head of government

Prime Minister of the Independent State of Papua New Guinea
- Praim Minista bilong Papua Niugini (Tok Pisin)
- Emblem of Papua New Guinea

- Flag of Papua New Guinea

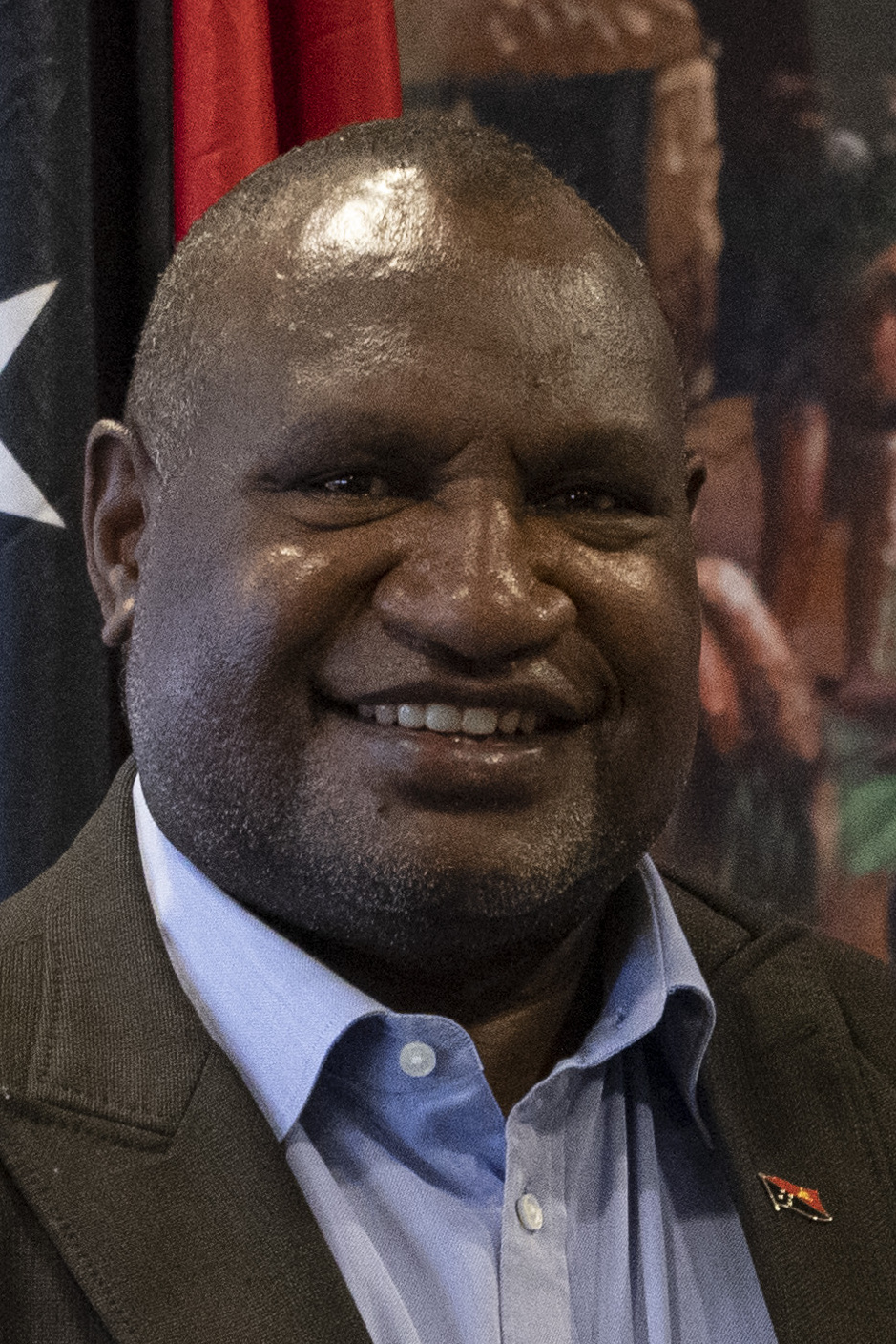
- Incumbent; James Marape since 30 May 2019
- Style: The Honourable
- Status: Head of government
- Abbreviation: PM
- Member of: National Parliament; Cabinet
- Seat: Port Moresby
- Nominator: National Parliament
- Appointer: Governor-General
- Term length: No fixed term length
- Constituting instrument: Constitution of Papua New Guinea
- Precursor: Chief Minister of Papua and New Guinea
- Formation: 16 September 1975
- First holder: Michael Somare
- Deputy: Deputy Prime Minister of Papua New Guinea
- Salary: K 346,037 / US$97,201 annually (2015) (Note: Equivalent to A$160,815, 15 January 2015)
- Website: pmnec.gov.pg

The prime minister of the Independent State of Papua New Guinea (Tok Pisin: Prai Minista bilong Papua Niugini) is Papua New Guinea's head of government, elected by the National Parliament and formally appointed by the Governor-General of Papua New Guinea. The prime minister serves as the head of his party, the head of the coalition government, and the chairman of the National Executive Council.

== Constitutional basis ==
The prime minister is chosen by the National Parliament and then formally appointed by the governor-general. Section 142 of the Constitution of Papua New Guinea provides for the election of a prime minister to occur at the first meeting of parliament after a general election. In the event of a vacancy in the office, the speaker of the national parliament must immediately call a meeting of parliament if it is not in session and proceed to the election of a new prime minister.

Where the parliament passes a motion of no confidence in the prime minister in accordance with section 145 of the constitution, the governor-general must dismiss the prime minister from office. The prime minister may also be removed by the governor-general if the parliament determines they are unfit for office on health grounds, or may resign voluntarily in accordance with section 146 of the constitution.

== History ==
The office of Prime Minister was preceded by the Chief Minister of Papua and New Guinea.

=== 2011–2012 constitutional crisis ===
From December 2011, the office was disputed between Peter O'Neill of the People's National Congress Party and Sir Michael Somare of the National Alliance Party; the latter eventually supported O'Neill as Prime Minister on 3 August 2012, thus ending the constitutional crisis.

== Department of the Prime Minister ==
The Department of the Prime Minister has the task of providing administrative services to the restoration exercise as well as advising the Prime Minister and other government leaders. After a July 1995 cabinet reshuffle by Julius Chan, functions of the department were expanded.

== Office ==
The office of the prime minister and other key government offices were initially located in Konedobu before being relocated to Waigani shortly after independence in 1975. Since April 2024, the Prime Minister's Office has been located at the newly-constructed Melanesia Haus, located opposite the main entrance to the National Parliament House.

== List of officeholders ==
Political parties

Pangu Pati (Pangu)
People's Progress Party (PPP)
People's Democratic Movement (PDM)
People's National Congress (PNC)
National Alliance Party (NAP)

Status

Denotes acting prime minister

No.	Portrait	Name (Birth–Death)	Term of office			Political party	Elected	Cabinet(s)	Ref.
No.	Portrait	Name (Birth–Death)	Took office	Left office	Time in office	Political party	Elected	Cabinet(s)	Ref.
1		Michael Somare (1936–2021)	16 September 1975	11 March 1980	4 years, 177 days	Pangu	—	Somare I	
1		Michael Somare (1936–2021)	16 September 1975	11 March 1980	4 years, 177 days	Pangu	1977	Somare I	
2		Sir Julius Chan (1939–2025)	11 March 1980	2 August 1982	2 years, 144 days	PPP	—	Chan I	
(1)		Michael Somare (1936–2021)	2 August 1982	21 November 1985	3 years, 111 days	Pangu	1982	Somare II	
3		Paias Wingti (born 1951)	21 November 1985	4 July 1988	2 years, 226 days	PDM	1987	Wingti I	
4		Sir Rabbie Namaliu (1947–2023)	4 July 1988	17 July 1992	4 years, 13 days	Pangu	—	Namaliu	
(3)		Paias Wingti (born 1951)	17 July 1992	30 August 1994	2 years, 44 days	PDM	1992	Wingti II	
(2)		Sir Julius Chan (1939–2025)	30 August 1994	27 March 1997	2 years, 209 days	PPP	—	Chan II	
5		John Giheno (1949–2017)	27 March 1997	2 June 1997	67 days	PPP	—	Giheno	
(2)		Sir Julius Chan (1939–2025)	2 June 1997	22 July 1997	50 days	PPP	—	Chan III	
6		Bill Skate (1953–2006)	22 July 1997	14 July 1999	1 year, 357 days	PNC	1997	Skate	
7		Sir Mekere Morauta (1946–2020)	14 July 1999	5 August 2002	3 years, 22 days	PDM	—	Morauta	
(1)		Sir Michael Somare (1936–2021)	5 August 2002	4 April 2011	8 years, 362 days	NAP	2002	Somare III	
(1)		Sir Michael Somare (1936–2021)	5 August 2002	4 April 2011	8 years, 362 days	NAP	2007	Somare IV	
—		Sam Abal (born 1958) acting	13 December 2010	17 January 2011	35 days	NAP	—	Somare IV	
—		Sam Abal (born 1958) acting	4 April 2011	2 August 2011	120 days	NAP	—	Somare IV	
8		Peter O'Neill (born 1965)	2 August 2011	29 May 2019	7 years, 300 days	PNC	—	Somare IV	
8		Peter O'Neill (born 1965)	2 August 2011	29 May 2019	7 years, 300 days	PNC	2012	O'Neill I	
8		Peter O'Neill (born 1965)	2 August 2011	29 May 2019	7 years, 300 days	PNC	2017	O'Neill II	
9		James Marape (born 1971)	30 May 2019	Incumbent	7 years, 100 days	Pangu	—	Caretaker	
9		James Marape (born 1971)	30 May 2019	Incumbent	7 years, 100 days	Pangu	—	Marape I	
9		James Marape (born 1971)	30 May 2019	Incumbent	7 years, 100 days	Pangu	2022	Marape II	

== Timeline ==
This is a graphical timeline of the prime ministers of Papua New Guinea. They are listed in order of first assuming office.

The following chart lists prime ministers by lifespan (living prime ministers on the green line), with the years outside of their tenure in beige.

== See also ==
- Monarchy of Papua New Guinea
- Governor-General of Papua New Guinea
