= National Advance Party (Papua New Guinea) =

Political party in Papua New Guinea

The National Advance Party was a political party in Papua New Guinea.

The party won one seat at the 2007 general election, with the return of John Pundari, who had been defeated for the Papua New Guinea Revival Party in 2002.

The party was deregistered in 2008 after merging with the People's Party in April of that year, with Pundari continuing as a member of that party.
