= Andrew Baing =

Papua New Guinean politician

Andrew Baing is a Papua New Guinean politician. He served as Deputy Prime Minister of Papua New Guinea in November 2003 under Prime Minister Michael Somare, before being sacked in less than a month for not supporting the government's proposed changes to the constitution. He was the leader of the People's Progress Party from October 2003 to December 2003, succeeding Allan Marat, and preceding Paul Tiensten. He was member of parliament for Markham Open Electorate. In 2005, the Ombudsman Commission alleged misconduct by Baing, including that he had misappropriated tens of thousands of dollars in 2002, and referred him to the Public Prosecutor. In 2006, a leadership tribunal found Baing guilty of misconduct.

Political offices
Preceded by Allan Marat	Deputy Prime Minister of Papua New Guinea; 2003	Succeeded by Moses Maladina
