= Women in the National Parliament of Papua New Guinea =

There have been 10 women in the National Parliament of Papua New Guinea since the independence of Papua New Guinea in 1975.

Name	Period of service
Nahau Rooney	1977-1987
Waliyato Clowes	1977-1982
Dame Josephine Abaijah	1972-1982, 1997-2002
Dame Carol Kidu	1997-2012
Delilah Gore	2012-2017
Loujaya Kouza	2012-2017
Julie Soso	2012-2017
Rufina Peter	2022-
Kessy Sawang	2022-
Francesca Semoso	2023-

As of 1 February 2019, Papua New Guinea was one of only three countries in the world out of 235 that had no women in its legislative branch or parliament. In the 2017 national election, 165 women ran for parliament out of a total of 3,000 candidates, or five percent. No women were elected, including the three female incumbents. However, in the July 2022 national election, for 118 members of parliament, two were elected. In October 2023, a further woman, Francesca Semoso, was elected to represent North Bougainville in a by-election.
