= Simon Solo =

Papua New Guinean politician (born 1961)

Simon Solo (born 28 July 1961) is a Papua New Guinea politician. He was the National Alliance Governor of Sandaun (West Sepik) Province and the member for West Sepik Provincial in the National Parliament of Papua New Guinea from 2007 to 2012. He defeated independent MP Carlos Yuni, who had represented the seat since 2002.
