= Miki Kaeok =

Papua New Guinean politician and Member of Parliament

Member of Parliament for Wapenamanda District
- Incumbent
- Assumed office 2022
- Preceded by: Rimbink Pato

Personal details
- Born: 1974 (age 51–52) Wapenamanda, Enga Province, Papua New Guinea
- Party: Pangu Pati
- Occupation: Politician

Miki Kaeok (born 1974) is a Papua New Guinean politician who has served as the member of parliament for Wapenamanda District in Enga Province since 2022. He was elected as a candidate of the Pangu Pati, defeating the long-serving incumbent, Rimbink Pato.
