= Pangu Pati =

Papua New Guinean political party

Papua and New Guinea Union Party Papua na Niugini Yunion Pati
- Abbreviation: Pangu; PNGU
- Leader: James Marape
- President: Erigere Singin
- General Secretary: Morris Tovebae
- Treasurer: Albert Mokae
- Founded: 13 June 1967; 58 years ago
- Membership (1968): ▲2,000+
- Ideology: Indigenism; Developmentalism; Economic nationalism; Papua New Guinea nationalism
- Colours: Green
- Slogan: "Pangu Save Lo Rot" (Note: "Pangu knows the way")
- National Parliament: 58 / 118 (2024)

Website
- pangupati.com

The Pangu Pati (Pangu Party), officially Papua na Niugini Yunion Pati (Note: Also spelt "Papua and Niugini Union Pati".) (lit. 'Papua and New Guinea Union Party'), (Note: Also simply known as the "Papua New Guinea Union Party".) is a nationalist and developmentalist political party in Papua New Guinea. The party is the oldest political party in Papua New Guinea and has held all levels of government throughout its history. As of 2023, it is the largest party in the National Parliament.

== History ==
The Pangu Pati was established on 13 June 1967, in order to contest the elections of 1968 (Papua and New Guinea). At the time of its founding, the party stood-out as its ideals were for a political unification of Papua and New Guinea, stronger economic development and to grow the national income. Other parties, such as the United Christian Democratic Party (UCDP), were in favour of Australian statehood. Although the party, and its candidates, were not in a formal political union, there were ten candidates of Pangu that were elected to the House of Assembly. The 1972 election, the last under Australian authority, saw Pangu-endorsed candidates win eighteen seats, with a total of pro-Pangu candidates reaching twenty-six.

Somare later served as Prime Minister of Papua New Guinea as the leader of the Pangu Party from 1972 to 1980 and from 1982 to 1985. In 1985, Paias Wingti led a faction of the party to split with Somare, and Wingti won a no-confidence vote against Somare, succeeding him as prime minister. In 1988, Somare was replaced as leader of Pangu by Rabbie Namaliu who served as prime minister from 1988 to 1992. Somare would then become leader of the National Alliance Party.

At the 2002 elections, the party won 6 of 109 seats, under the leadership of Chris Haiveta. After that election, Somare returned to power as prime minister. Pangu became a member of his coalition government, and continued to support the Somare government after the 2007 elections, in which Pangu won 5 seats.

It won only one seat at the 2012 election, that of Angoram MP Ludwig Schulze, but was left unrepresented when Schulze died in March 2013. In August 2014, Deputy Opposition Leader Sam Basil crossed to Pangu and reactivated its parliamentary wing, taking on the leadership. The party's numbers increased to two in August 2015 when William Samb won a by-election in Goilala Open, then to nine following the 2017 elections.

At the 2022 elections, Pangu won a decisive first-place showing, its best since 1982, with 39 seats. James Marape, who had defected from the previously largest party, the PNC, to Pangu, continued his tenure as prime minister. This followed several other defections from the PNC to Pangu, largely attributed to the protracted crisis of leadership under Prime Minister O'Neill.

== Electoral results ==
National Parliament
| Election | Leader | Votes | % | Seats | +/– | Government |
|---|---|---|---|---|---|---|
| 1977 | Michael Somare | —N/a | 35% (#1) | 30 / 109 | New | Coalition |
| 1982 | Michael Somare | No data | | 51 / 109 | ▲21 | Coalition |
| 1987 | Michael Somare | 408,082 | 14.93 (#1) | 26 / 109 | ▼25 | Opposition |
| 1992 | Rabbie Namaliu | 294,738 | 9.33 (#1) | 22 / 109 | ▼4 | Opposition |
| 1997 | Chris Haiveta | 237,028 | 5.31 (#3) | 13 / 109 | ▼9 | Opposition |
| 2002 | Chris Haiveta | No data | | 6 / 109 | ▼7 | Opposition |
| 2007 | Chris Haiveta | No data | | 5 / 109 | ▼1 | Coalition |
| 2012 | Andrew Kumbakor | No data | | 1 / 111 | ▼4 | Opposition |
| 2017 | Sam Basil | 322,049 | 4.08 (#4) | 9 / 111 | ▲8 | Coalition |
| 2022 | James Marape | No data | | 39 / 116 | ▲30 | Coalition |
