= Moses Maladina =

Moses Maladina (born 4 September 1959) is a former Deputy Prime Minister of Papua New Guinea. He is a qualified lawyer, agriculturalist and businessman with investments in PNG and various parts of the Asia Pacific region. He is also a published author which includes his fiction novel Tabu. His present residence is in Baiyer River, Western Highlands Province, in PNG where he has a coffee plantation.

Maladina was born in PNG, and apart from being educated in his country of birth he spent a number of years in his early childhood at boarding schools in Australia for his primary and high school education. For his tertiary education he attended the University of Papua New Guinea and the University of Canterbury in New Zealand. He also attended Vudal Agricultural College in Rabaul, PNG, where he graduated as a Tropical Agriculturalist.

As a Member of Parliament in PNG for a period of 10 years Maladina occupied senior Ministerial portfolios including being the Minister for Agriculture and Livestock, Minister for Public Service, Minister for Internal Security (Police) and Minister for National Planning. He was responsible for major policy and legislative reforms in agriculture (specially to the coffee industry), in the Public Service and the Judiciary. He successfully introduced legislation in Parliament to increase the number of judges in the National and Supreme Court, increased the retirement age of Judges and increased the jurisdiction of the District Court Magistrates. His amendments to the Constitution which were unanimously supported by both sides of the House related to changes regarding the powers of the Ombudsman Commission. These Constitutional amendments drew widespread criticism and protest amongst the general public who were of the view that the changes eroded the powers of the Ombudsman Commission. The Supreme Court subsequently declared these Constitutional amendments invalid.

Maladina was also the CEO and Managing Director of Air Niugini the National Airline and Flag Carrier of PNG. He introduced the first Dash 8 aircraft to PNG in 1997. Maladina has practised extensively as a Barrister and Solicitor in PNG, and as a Diplomat he served as PNG’s High Commissioner to New Zealand.

Maladina is currently the Chairman of PNG Power Ltd (Papua New Guinea’s main electricity company), and Chairman of Kumul Consolidated Holdings Ltd. He also holds directorship positions in various other companies in Papua New Guinea.

Political offices
Preceded by Andrew Baing	Deputy Prime Minister of Papua New Guinea; 2003–2004	Succeeded by Moi Avei
