= People's Democratic Movement =

- Leader: Paias Wingti
- President: Geoffrey Bull
- Secretary: Ezekiel Pawai
- Founded: 1985
- National Parliament: 1 / 111

The People's Democratic Movement is a political party in Papua New Guinea.

It was founded by Paias Wingti in 1985, after his faction left the Pangu Party. Wingti served as prime minister from 1985 to 1988 and from 1992 to 1994. He was later replaced as leader by Mekere Morauta who also served as prime minister during his leadership of the PDM from 1999 to 2002.

The party won 13 of 109 seats at the 2002 general election. It became the second largest party in Parliament, but the largest party, the National Alliance Party led by Michael Somare formed the government. The PDM joined the opposition in the National Parliament. Before the 2007 general elections, Morauta lost the leadership of the party and founded his own party, the Papua New Guinea Party, while Wingti became the leader of the PDM again. At the 2007 general elections, the PDM was heavily defeated, winning 5 seats in Parliament. Wingti was among those who lost their seats, and Morauta’s new Papua New Guinea Party became the largest opposition party with 8 seats. The PDM left the opposition and joined Somare’s coalition government.

In the 2012 general election, all 6 PDM members joined other parties before going into the election, with Wingti returning in Western Highlands Regional to become the Governor of the Province, and Tommy Tomscholl elected in Middle Ramu Open. Tomscholl was appointed Minister for Agriculture and Livestock by Peter O'Neill, but subsequently defected to O'Neill's People's National Congress, leaving Wingti as the party's sole MP. Joe Koim Komun of Jiwaka Province has since joined PDM, having formerly sat as an independent.

As of May 2019, the party had one seat in the National Parliament.
