= People's National Congress (Papua New Guinea) =

- Leader: Joseph Lelang
- President: Garret Kissing
- Secretary: Eddie Mike Jondi
- Founded: May 1993
- Ideology: Populism
- National Parliament: 14 / 118

Website
- pnc4png.com

The People's National Congress is a political party in Papua New Guinea. Its former leader Bill Skate served as prime minister from 1997 to 1999 and as speaker of Parliament from 2002 to 2004. Skate died in 2006 and the party was led by Peter O'Neill until 2022. PNC originated from the National Capital District where former leader (late Bill Skate) was the Governor of NCD and the Parliamentary Member. The party had 16 members in the 113-seat National Parliament of Papua New Guinea as of December 2022.

== History ==
The party was founded in 1993. It merged with the Christian Country Party and a number of smaller parties in April 1998 to form the PNG First Party, but split in June 1999 into a revived People's National Congress and a revived National Party.

At the National General elections of 2002, the party won 2 of 109 seats. At the 2007 election, the party won 4 seats. It became a member of the coalition government led by Michael Somare's National Alliance, and received two cabinet positions.

Following that on August 2, 2011, nine years after holding the position of prime minister, the National Alliance coalition government led by Michael Somare was superseded by the PNC Party led Peter O'Neill coalition alongside PNG Party Leader Belden Namah, and Parliament Speaker Jeffery Nape, who was responsible for determining that the office of the Prime Minister was vacant in the Papua New Guinean Constitutional Crisis.

Peter O'Neill was thereafter elected prime minister, resulting in a political impasse between the O'Neill-Namah led coalition majority and the Somare led-minority. The nation underwent a number of difficulties and court action was brought forward against the two political groups. The police force and defence force were divided, and there was the possibility of a possible military coup and mutiny, followed by a police mutiny and public demonstrations funded by the various interest parties.

The party fared well in the National General Elections of 2012 with Leader Peter O'Neill and Deputy Leader Job Pomat, led by with its free education and free health policy platform winning 27 seats nationally. In the 9th Parliament the party holds 12 Ministries, as well as the Deputy Speaker position and the Prime Ministership. Deputy Leader Job Pomat lost his seat of Manus Open to Ronny Knight, and was subsequently replaced as Deputy Party Leader by Mao Zeming of Tewa Siassi Open.

In the 9th Parliament the party did not assume its relations with the PNG Party led by Belden Namah and was forced to consolidate its numbers with its political rivals including the National Alliance led by Michael Somare, the Peoples Progress Party led by former prime minister Sir Julius Chan and the People's Democratic Movement led by former prime minister Paias Wingti. The Opposition of the 9th Parliament is now led by Belden Namah and 11 MPs.

PNC Pre-Election Part Officials and Executives Simon Korua (President), Garret Kising (Vice President), and Jonathan O'ata (Secretary General), were all elected in the PNC National Congress held in Goroka in late February 2012 and early April 2012, which was attended by many public participants and registered members numbering close to 5,000 people. The current Registrar of Political Parties, Dr Gelu, was present and accompanied by Dr David Kavanamur (Advisor and former chairman of Government Task Force) among the many dignitaries that accompanied the Party Leader Peter O'Neill, who was then widely recognised as the prime minister of Papua New Guinea.

== Core policies ==
Under the leadership of Prime Minister Hon. Peter O’Neill has developed 5 core policies for the country. "These policies are not short term solutions, but long term strategies to deliver real outcomes and improve the communities of Papua New Guinea." The 5 core policies are the following, "Law & Order", "Infrastructure", "Healthcare", "Education" and "Our Economy."

The party's economic policy is focused on attracting foreign investment.

== Election results ==
=== National elections ===
Election	Total votes	Share of vote	Seats	+/–	Government
2002			2 / 109	▲2	in opposition
2007			5 / 109	▲3	In government
2012			27 / 111	▲22	In government
2017			28 / 111	▲1	In government
2022	#2		17 / 109	▼11	in opposition
