= Papua New Guinea Party =

- Leader: Belden Namah
- President: Andrew Baing
- Secretary: Kila Poka
- Founder: Mekere Morauta and Wake Goi
- Founded: 2007
- National Parliament: 3 / 118

Website
- Facebook page

The Papua New Guinea Party is a political party in Papua New Guinea. It was founded in 2007 by Mekere Morauta, the former prime minister and leader of the People's Democratic Movement, along with MP Wake Goi.

The party won 8 out of 109 seats in the 2007 General Election. With this result, the party became the largest opposition party.

When Morauta stepped down from the leadership of the opposition and of the party in May 2010, Belden Namah was elected to succeed him in both positions. In August 2011, following a change in government, Namah became Deputy Prime Minister under PM Peter O'Neill, as part of a coalition government.

By January 2012, the party's parliamentary membership had increased to 25, as members of smaller parties joined.

The party has 3 members in the 113-seat National Parliament of Papua New Guinea as of December 2022.
