= 2012 Papua New Guinean general election =

- 23 June–13 July 2012
- All 111 seats in the National Parliament
Party	Leader	Seats
PNC	Peter O'Neill	27
THERP	Don Polye	12
PNG Party	Belden Namah	8
NAP	Michael Somare	7
URP	William Duma	7
People's Party	Peter Ipatas	6
PPP	Julius Chan	6
SDP	Powes Parkop	3
CRP	Joseph Lelang	2
MLP	Allan Marat	2
NGP	Bart Philemon	2
PMC	Gary Juffa	2
PUA	Anderson Agiru	2
PDM	Paias Wingti	2
IPP	John Tekwie	1
ODP	Puka Temu	1
Pangu Pati	Andrew Kumbakor	1
PNGCDP		1
Country Party	Thompson Harokaqveh	1
Star Alliance		1
United Party		1
Independents	–	16
This lists parties that won seats. See the complete results below.
Prime Minister before	Prime Minister after
Disputed	Peter O'Neill; PNC

General elections were held in Papua New Guinea from 23 June until around 13 July 2012, after being postponed by a further week to allow for security personnel to crisscross the country, particularly the highland provinces. The elections followed controversy over incomplete electoral rolls and a constitutional crisis caused by a dispute over the office of prime minister between Michael Somare and Peter O'Neill.

== Background ==
In 2011 a dispute arose between Sir Michael Somare and Peter O'Neill over who was the legitimate prime minister. Somare was backed by the Supreme Court, while O'Neill gained the support of a majority of the parliament, the Army and the civil service. O'Neill was internationally recognised as holding the office of prime minister. Both claimants also appointed their own police chiefs and heads of the military. Amidst continuing conflicts, a mutiny occurred in 2012 against factions of the military. There were also accusations of Australian partisanship over Prime Minister Julia Gillard's support for the O'Neill government.

== Election date ==
There was a suggestion by the parliament to postpone the election for up to a year in the light of an unprepared process in regards to the implementation of a biometric voting system and an only 60% complete voter roll. Deputy Prime Minister Belden Namah was a proponent of this idea saying the election commission and the census had failed in the count of the population. However, this was decided against by O'Neill who said the United Nations and Australia would step up to support the process. However, he later retracted the comment.

On 5 April the parliament voted to postpone the election for six months by a vote of 63 to 11, with O'Neill and Namah voting for the postponement. The Parliamentary motion instructed head of the election commission, Andrew Trawen, to ask the Governor-General of Papua New Guinea Sir Michael Ogio for the delay. However, as Trawen has previously asserted that parliament has no power to postpone the election since its five-year term is specified in the constitution of Papua New Guinea and he had previously said that "the nation is ready to go to the polls," he was "consulting his lawyers" as to which direction to proceed. A former attorney-general, Sir Arnold Amet, said the vote was unconstitutional and would be challenged in court. Leader of the Opposition Carol Kidu said she was "vehemently opposed" to the suspension. "How can we take anything they say at their word? The whole country is being held to ransom by these decisions." However, after intense domestic and international pressure, O'Neill backed away from this demand and the election was held from 23 June to about 13 July which was in the scheduled timeslot.

== Electoral system ==
The National parliament is elected from 111 single-member electorates. 89 of them are open electorates distributed around the country. Additionally, each of the 22 provinces elects 1 regional member, which also takes the title of provincial governor. The candidates are elected using Limited preferential voting, where the voter ranks 3 candidates in the order of preference.

== Parties and campaign ==
Since the office of the prime minister was disputed, Somare's National Alliance Party has splintered into several factions following the constitutional crisis. O'Neill, who originally had no party base, formed an alliance in March with Belden Namah, former Prime Ministers Sir Mekere Morauta and Bill Skate to contest the election.

Following the disintegration of Somare's party, Dame Carol Kidu assumed the title of Leader of the Opposition despite having no parliamentary following. Kidu is the parliament's only female member and was born in Australia.

As a result of capital inflows in the natural resources sector, there was an increase in campaign finance during the electoral process. The Sydney Morning Herald (SMH) cited payments to tribal, clan and village extended family heads in order to get "block votes", particularly in the seven highland provinces where 45 of 111 MPs are chosen. This was in contrast to the previous Moka system that involved high-profile individuals who gained both prestige and power in exchange for gifts such as pigs, shells and yams to each other in order to entangle others in a web of unrepayable debt, according to the SMH. It also noted an event in the Dei Open electorate two days prior to its voting date that consisted of several pigs for slaughter. Local MP Puri Ruing, who presided over the ceremony, said that "this is not election-related. It's a tribal peace settlement over ownership of a coffee plantation."

== Constitutional crisis developments ==
Following a Supreme Court's ruling, Deputy Prime Minister Francis Marus said that Somare was the legitimate prime minister, but since he had missed three sitting of parliament the office was now vacant and a new prime minister would be elected on 30 May.

Chief Justice Sir Salamo Injia, one of the three judges who ruled that Somare was the legitimate prime minister was arrested in May and later charged with sedition. Justice Nicholas Kirriwom, who joined Injia's decision was also arrested on 28 May and "will be charged with sedition", according to a police spokesman.

A splinter group of police officers blockaded parliament on 26 May to prevent the holding of a special sitting of parliament, at which MPs voted for a state of emergency and rejected the Supreme Court’s ruling that Somare should be reinstated. The police leadership then called for an end to the political stalemate, while Michael Ogio refused to sign the document approving the sitting which called for a state of emergency, or any documents, until a government is formed after the election.

== Observers ==
Three sets of observation teams monitored the election:

- Domestic Observation: 22 teams (joint project between the PNG National Research Institute and the Australian National University)
- Commonwealth Observers
- Transparency International

== Controversies ==
The electoral process delayed the release of a report into the sinking of the MV Rabaul Queen. A Commission of Inquiry had been set up and led by Warwick Andrew, who submitted the final report to caretaker Prime Minister Peter O'Neill. O'Neill said that the 200-page report would first need to be tabled in parliament before its release and would thus have to wait for the new parliament to sit.

=== Cannibalism ===
In the remote jungle area of Tangu and Biamb villages, near Madang, cult killings disrupted the voting process after at least seven people - five men and two women - were killed over the past three months as they practiced sanguma. The killed persons became victims of cannibalism. On July 4, the police arrested twenty-nine people who allegedly ate their victims.

== Conduct ==
Amidst the election days, Deputy Prime Minister Belden Namah said that PM Peter O'Neill should be "ashamed" for allowing the election to take place as scheduled because of the problems with the voter rolls in urban areas and blaming Australia for contributing to the claimed pandemonium in saying: "Cries have been received from all parts of PNG echoing and demonstrating that our country was and is not ready to proceed with elections this last week. What a disaster. Peter O'Neill should be ashamed for listening to the PNG Electoral Commissioner and its Australian advisers." Though he said there were over 200 Australian advisers working for the election commission, The Australian claimed there were "just 22 Australian logistical advisers". On 28 June, O'Neill appealed to the Electoral Commissioner Andrew Trawen to release supplementary common rolls after many people had reported not being on the electoral rolls at voting centres. He also said of Namah that "I'm fed up with this political opportunism. It is not the job of politicians to run elections. That is the job of the election commissioner." Paul Barker, the executive director of the Institute of National Affairs, said that it was common to see errors in the electoral rolls and that "it was wide scale in the 2007 poll, but it seems worse now. The current roll hasn't been updated. The roll has names where people lived 20 years ago." He also said that Trawen was not entirely to blame as "the electoral commission only gets a trickle of money in the early years, then big cash just before the election. In that time, they cannot be doing what they're supposed to be doing."

Other problems during the election process included security measures and consequent delays. The first day of voting was extended by an extra day in the Southern Highlands and Hela provinces because the voting centres were not set up in time, while the voting on 27 June for Enga province was also extended by a day. On the same day, in Hela supporters of the 81 candidates running in the election turned violent in Tari after radio reports of moving ballot boxes to a bigger centre, such as Mount Hagen, in order to ascertain the result because of tensions related to possible ballot stuffing and voter intimidation. The voters tried to prevent the removal of the boxes by blocking roads out of the city and prevent take-offs from the airport; others also went to the local police station where the ballot boxes were stored, but were driven back by both police and Defence Force soldiers. Andrew Trawen then announced that the vote counting would occur with the province after a secure place was decided. He said that the "options were Port Moresby and Mount Hagen but it was considered that the people of Hela province need to embrace the elections and take responsibility for their own destiny." In the Western Highlands 29 June was the scheduled date of voting but was postponed to 1 July so that security forces could arrive from the Southern Highlands and Enga; however, the voting could be further postponed by one or two days. Paul Ogil, the cousin of former Foreign Secretary Gabriel Pepson, who is working with his campaign, said: "Any postponement of polling is a burden to them (candidates) because they have to keep disbursing money (such as meals, a place to sleep and fares home for those visiting the "campaign house" of candidates, as well as supporting a fleet of about 10 cars with each vehicle and its crew costing about 500 kina a day in fuel, food, and buai). This means they have to spend hundreds of thousands of kina a day extra. All our bank balances are dwindling to nothing. We are all praying: the sooner it's over the better for us." According to the election observer Transparency International's Operations Manager Jerry Bagita, the process in other coastal and island provinces went off peacefully.

There were reports of underage, illegal voting, as well as the poor quality of the indelible ink used to mark voters, which facilitated double voting. On 4 July 2012, The National reported that four people, including an election official had been charged with tampering with ballot boxes and papers in the Dei electorate of the Western Highlands. It was alleged that the four individuals stole six ballot boxes and filled them with doctored ballot papers before returning them to the CEG officials. In Hela province, two empty boxes were also stolen and returned with doctored ballots, while three other ballot boxes were destroyed by angry voters. Additionally, in Kandep, Enga province, on 7 July a GEC officer was stabbed to death, while a colleague was injured in a bush-knife at a vote counting centre in Wabag allegedly as revenge for another murder. Following this voting was suspended for two days. Vote counting in Port Moresby also resumed the next day after resolution to a dispute over payments with GEC officials. Trawen also did not comment on the burning of ballots over the dispute. Though he said vote counting was ongoing in eight of 22 provinces, there was concern that monitors—some of whom were employed by candidates—had interfered in what was supposed to be independent vote counting. "We will not hesitate to remove any scrutineer from counting venues that continuously cross the line during counting sessions. The elections are not over. We still appeal to every citizen to ensure it is free, fair and safe elections right through to the end, regardless of the hiccups and security situations we have had so far."

Parliamentary Speaker Jeffrey Nape was arrested following a charge of attempting to bribe a candidate and of undue influence in his home province of Simbu, according to provincial police commander Augustine Wampe. While Nape said the charge was politically motivated, he was due to attend a court hearing into the matter after the electoral process.

The voting timeframe was also speculated to being increased as the highlands provinces would not finish in time. The Bougainville area was also inaccessible as the GEC did not have the ships to transport its team to the said outlying atolls until the following week. However, vote counting had already started in the other provinces where voting had finished, despite protests against the process.

Despite the problems, on 2 July, Andrew Trawen said that, according to national law, vote counting would begin as soon as possible as "that is the procedure we've followed over the years, we have not swayed from that. We will continue to abide by that provision of the law."

Electoral observers said the election was not a failure, even though they were not in full praise.

== Results ==
The National Alliance Party of former Prime Minister Michael Somare lost more than 20 seats in the election. Conversely, the People's National Congress Party gained more than 20 seats. Additionally, the Truth Heritage Empowerment Party, which was not represented in the previous parliament, gained 12 seats.

Somare, who won the East Sepik Provincial seat for the National Alliance Party, said that "everywhere people have said, 'Ours is a sorry vote. We want to show, the people of PNG, a Sepik who represented us and represented the whole country should be not treated in that way.'" It followed his comments that he was set to retire but he changed his mind as "just at a tick of the Speaker's pen, he says I'm out, and I'm out of parliament. My idea is to get National Alliance and its coalition partners back into government, then say goodbye to them, stay as a backbencher and stay in my province," after saying that he would spurn any coalition overtures because "they stabbed me in the back after keeping them for 9½ years, making them ministers, very important portfolio."

On 6 July, when the electoral process was supposed to conclude, it was announced that the election could continue for about a week longer. By the beginning of the third week, voting was complete in most of the country except for some inland villages and outlying islands. Governor-General Michael Ogio was expected to call on the leader of the largest party to form a government.

Prime Minister Peter O'Neill was announced as the winner of his contest in the Ialiba-Panga electorate in the Southern Highlands Province with 44,917 (75%) of the votes. He then said: "In a very turbulent 10-month period the PNC has led the government and provided stability, laying the foundation for economic growth and rebuilding our infrastructure, by introducing free education, free health care and unveiling an infrastructure development program. People obviously want these policies and programs to continue and are turning up in droves to support PNC candidates;" while adding that he would form the next government.

Party	Seats
People's National Congress	27
Triumph Heritage Empowerment Rural Party	12
Papua New Guinea Party	8
National Alliance Party	7
United Resources Party	7
People's Party	6
People's Progress Party	6
Social Democratic Party	3
Coalition for Reform Party	2
Melanesian Liberal Party	2
New Generation Party	2
People's Movement for Change	2
People's United Assembly	2
People's Democratic Movement	2
Indigenous People's Party	1
Our Development Party	1
Pangu Pati	1
Papua New Guinea Constitutional Democratic Party	1
PNG Country Party	1
Star Alliance Party	1
United Party	1
Independents	16
Total	111
Source: PNG Electoral Commission
