= National Alliance Party =

Papua New Guinean political party

- Leader: Patrick Pruaitch
- President: Walter Schnaubelt
- Secretary: Joyce Grant
- Founded: 1995
- National Parliament: 4 / 118

Website
- Facebook page

The National Alliance Party has operated as a political party in Papua New Guinea since 1995. As of May 2019, the party had 11 members in the 111-seat National Parliament of Papua New Guinea, and was part of the Alliance Accord for Change, opposition to the O'Neill led government for Papua New Guinea's 10th Parliament.

== History ==
It was founded in 1995 after the dissolution of the Melanesian Alliance Party members John Momis, Bernard Narokobi who merged with Moi Avei, Bart Philemon and Masket Iangalio, who then invited Sir Michael Somare to lead them to the 1997 elections after he had been sacked as leader of the Pangu Party.

National Alliance took 19 of 109 seats in parliament at the 2002 election, making it the largest single party, and as such the party was invited to form the government. The National Alliance-led government of 2002–2007 was the first government since independence in 1975 to survive a full five-year term — all previous governments had fallen to votes of no confidence. In 2006, party co-founder Bart Philemon attempted to depose Somare as party leader, but this challenge was unsuccessful and Philemon went to the opposition benches, remaining there as leader of the New Generation Party even after Somare’s victory in the elections.

At the 2007 General Election, the party increased its representation, gaining 27 seats and remaining by far the largest party. Michael Somare was easily confirmed by Parliament for another term as prime minister, as several parties joined a coalition with the National Alliance, and 13 independents announced their decision to join the National Alliance party, bringing its representation to 40 members.

In August 2011, the NAP-led Somare government was brought down in a parliamentary motion of no confidence (while Somare was recovering from surgery in hospital), leading to a split in the party, between members who remained loyal to Somare, and others who joined Peter O'Neill's new government. In October, it was reported simultaneously that the party was expelling the latter, and that the latter's leader, Don Polye, had assumed leadership of the party. What had happened was a split, with two opposing factions both claiming to constitute the party.

In January 2012, Polye purported to de-register the NAP, despite the existence of a rival faction. The members of his faction formed a new party, the Triumph Heritage Empowerment Rural Party ("T.H.E. Party"), ahead of the June 2012 general election. Polye stated: "Somare is gone, and so will his party. NA will be history". The remaining faction of the party continue to recognise Michael Somare's leadership.

In late March 2017, Michael Somare bid farewell to the party alongside his decision to not contest his constituency in the 2017 General Election. In May 2017, the party withdrew from O'Neill's government coalition with People's National Congress, ending a five-year agreement.
