= National Parliament of Papua New Guinea =

Unicameral legislature of Papua New Guinea

- 11th Parliament

Type
- Type: Unicameral
- Term limits: 5 years

History
- Founded: 1964

Leadership
- Speaker: Job Pomat since 2 August 2017
- Prime Minister: James Marape, Pangu since 30 May 2019
- Leader of the Opposition: Douglas Tomuriesa, PNC since 16 February 2024

Structure
- Seats: 118 (96 open electorates and 22 provincial electorates)
- Political groups: Government (102): Pangu Pati (42); United Resources (12); Independents (8); National Alliance (4); People's Party (4); Social Democratic (4); People's First (4); National Party (3); PNG Party (3); United Labour (3); Advance PNG (2); Liberal Party (2); Allegiance Party (1); Green Party (1); Melanesian Alliance (1); New Generation (1); Our Development (1); People's Labour (1); PMC Party (1); PNC Party (1); People's Progress (1); People's Reform (1); Destiny Party (1); T.H.E. Party (1); Opposition (13): PNC Party (13); Other (3): Vacant Seats (3)
- Political groups: 5

Elections
- Voting system: Limited instant-runoff voting
- Last election: 9 – 22 July 2022
- Next election: 2027

Meeting place
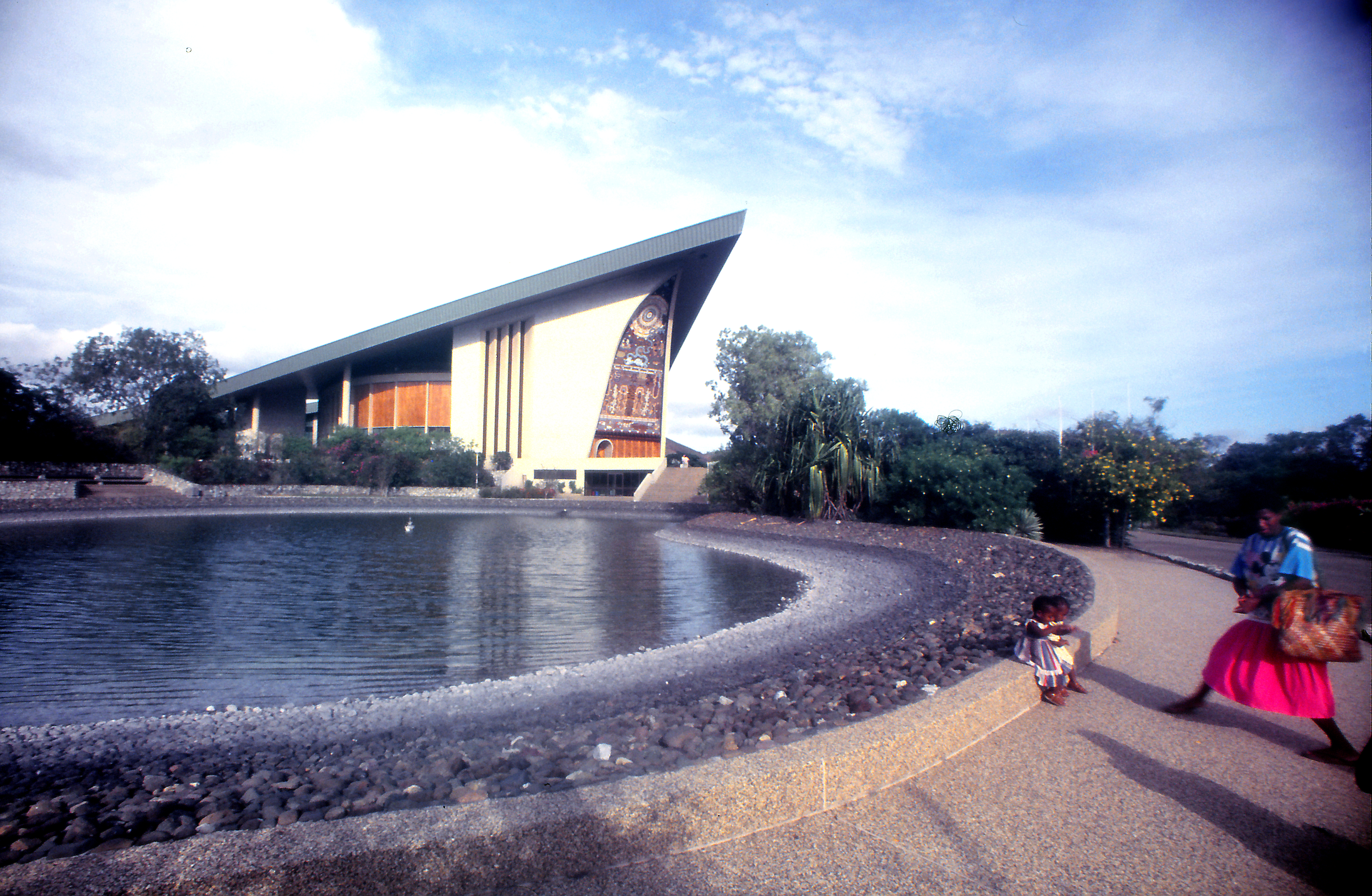
- National Parliament House, Port Moresby

Website
- www.parliament.gov.pg

The National Parliament of Papua New Guinea is the unicameral national legislature in Papua New Guinea. It was created in 1964 as the House of Assembly of Papua and New Guinea but gained its current name after the nation was granted independence in 1975.

== Composition and electoral system ==
The 111 members of parliament serve five-year terms, 89 of whom are chosen from single-member "open" electorates, which are sometimes referred to as "seats" but are officially known as constituencies. The remaining 22 are chosen from single-member provincial electorates: the 20 provinces, the autonomous province of Bougainville, and the National Capital District. Each provincial member becomes governor of their province unless they take a ministerial position, in which case the governorship passes to an open member of the province.

From 1964 until 1977 an Optional Preferential Voting System was used. The first past the post system was used from 1977 until 2002. Electoral reforms introduced by former Prime Minister Mekere Morauta introduced Limited Preferential Voting, in which voters numbered three preferred candidates. LPV was first used nationally in the 2007 election.

The prime minister of Papua New Guinea is elected by members of parliament in accordance with section 142 of the national constitution, before being formally appointed by the governor-general of Papua New Guinea. All other government ministers – who form the National Executive Council and act as the country's cabinet – are appointed by the governor-general on the advice of the prime minister. Each government minister must be a member of parliament and section 141 of the constitution provides for the executive to be responsible to the legislature as the representative of the people of Papua New Guinea.

Papua New Guinea has a fractious political culture, and no party in the history of parliament has yet won a majority. Therefore, negotiations between parties have always been necessary to form governments. New governments are protected from votes of no confidence during their first 18 months and during the last 12 months before a national election. More recently, in a move aimed at further minimizing no-confidence motions, then-Prime Minister Mekere Morauta introduced changes that prevented members of the government from voting in favour of such a motion.

All citizens over the age of 18 may vote, although voting is not compulsory.

== See also ==
- Women in the National Parliament of Papua New Guinea
- Elections in Papua New Guinea
- Speaker of the National Parliament of Papua New Guinea
- Members of the National Parliament of Papua New Guinea
  - Members of the National Parliament of Papua New Guinea, 2002–2007
  - Members of the National Parliament of Papua New Guinea, 2007–2012
  - Members of the National Parliament of Papua New Guinea, 2012–2017
  - Members of the National Parliament of Papua New Guinea, 2017–2022
  - Members of the National Parliament of Papua New Guinea, 2022–2027
- List of legislatures by country
- Politics of Papua New Guinea
- Leader of the Opposition
- List of members of the Papua New Guinean Parliament who died in office
