= Health in Papua New Guinea =

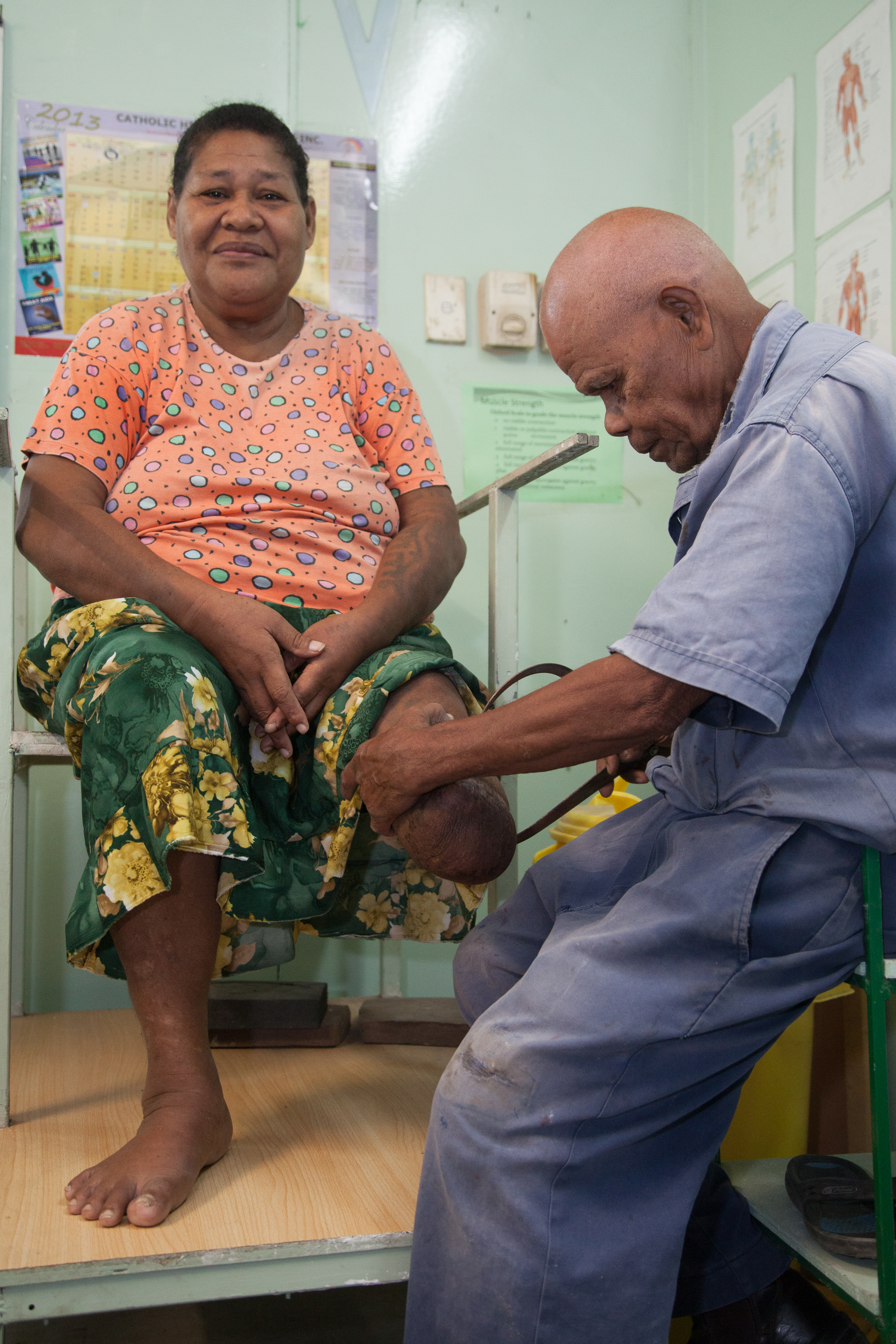
Doctor fitting a patient who lost her leg to diabetes

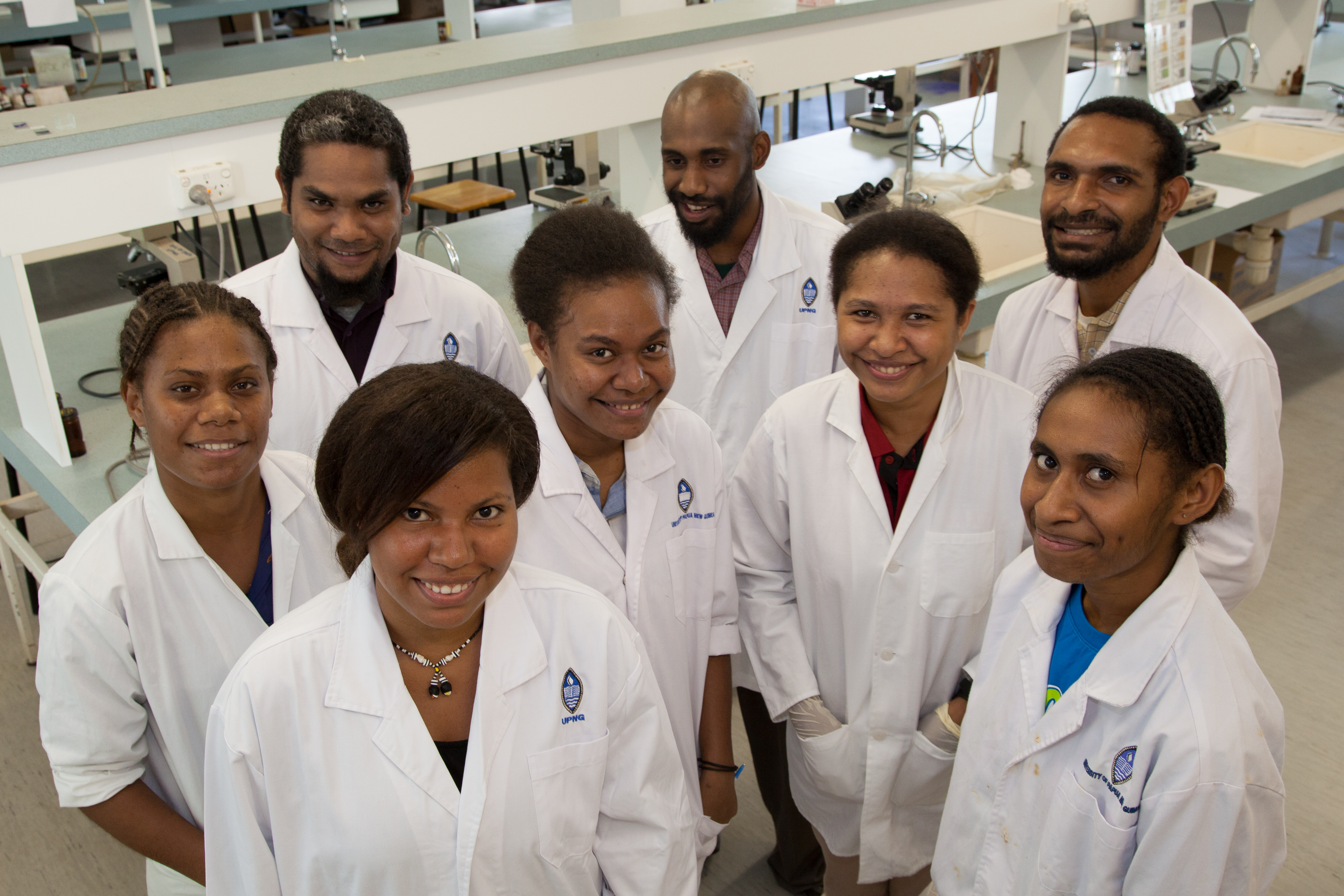
Medical students from the UPNG School of Medicine and Health Science

Life expectancy in Papua New Guinea (PNG) at birth was 64 years for men in 2016 and 68 for women, markedly lower than neighbouring countries: Indonesia, 67 and 71; Australia, 81 and 85.

Government expenditure health in 2014 accounted for 9.5% of total government spending, with total health expenditure equating to 4.3% of GDP. There were five physicians per 100,000 people in the early 2000s.

The 2010 maternal mortality rate per 100,000 births for Papua New Guinea was 250. This is compared with 311.9 in 2008 and 476.3 in 1990. The under-five mortality rate per 1,000 births is 69, and the neonatal mortality as a percentage of under-fives' mortality is 37. In Papua New Guinea, the number of midwives per 1,000 live births is 1 and the lifetime risk of death for pregnant women is 1 in 94.

The Human Rights Measurement Initiative finds that Papua New Guinea is fulfilling 71.9% of what it should be fulfilling for the right to health based on its level of income. When looking at the right to health with respect to children, Papua New Guinea achieves 90.8% of what is expected based on its current income. In regards to the right to health amongst the adult population, the country achieves only 81.6% of what is expected based on the nation's level of income. Papua New Guinea falls into the "very bad" category when evaluating the right to reproductive health because the nation is fulfilling only 42.8% of what the nation is expected to achieve based on the resources (income) it has available.

== Communicable diseases ==
The communicable diseases that cause the most deaths in PNG are lower respiratory infections such as tuberculosis. Lower respiratory infections are the fourth leading cause of death in PNG.

=== Malaria ===
Malaria is the leading cause of illness and 27th leading cause of death in PNG. In 2003, the most recently reported year, 70,226 cases of laboratory-confirmed malaria were reported, along with 537 deaths. A total of 1,729,697 cases were probable. Other communicable diseases, tuberculosis, diarrhoeal diseases, and acute respiratory disease are also big problems.

=== HIV/AIDS ===
Papua New Guinea has the highest incidence of HIV and AIDS in the Pacific region and is the fourth country in the Asia Pacific region to fit the criteria for a generalised HIV/AIDS epidemic. Lack of HIV/AIDS awareness is a major problem, especially in rural areas.

=== Poliomyelitis ===
In 2018 there was a poliomyelitis (polio) outbreak that had 10 confirmed cases in the Morobe Province. Previously, there had been no confirmed cases since 2000 when the World Health Organization (WHO) declared that Papua New Guinea was polio-free.

In 2025, 2 children in Lae were diagnosed with polio, prompting the WHO to start mass vaccinations of children under 5.

== Obesity ==
21% of adults were obese in 2021.
