= Papua New Guinea =

Country in Oceania

Independent State of Papua New Guinea
(in other official languages)
Hiri Motu	Gau Hedinarai ai Papua–Matamata Guinea
Tok Pisin	Independen Stet bilong Papua Niugini
- Flag Emblem
- Motto: 'Unity in diversity'
- Anthem: "O Arise, All You Sons" Royal anthem: "God Save the King"
- Location of Papua New Guinea (green)
- Capital and largest city: Port Moresby; 09°28′44″S 147°08′58″E
- Official languages: English; Hiri Motu; PNG Sign Language; Tok Pisin
- Indigenous languages: 839 languages
- Religion (2011): 95.5% Christianity (official); 64.3% Protestantism; 26.0% Catholicism; 5.2% other Christian; 3.1% unspecified; 1.4% others or none
- Demonym: Papua New Guinean
- Government: Unitary parliamentary constitutional monarchy
  - Monarch: Charles III
  - Governor-General: Bob Dadae
  - Prime Minister: James Marape
- Legislature: National Parliament

Independence from Australia
  - Territory of Papua: 1 September 1906
  - Territory of New Guinea: 19 May 1921
  - Administrative union: 1 July 1949
  - Self-governing: 1 December 1973
  - Independence: 16 September 1975

Area
  - Total: 462,840 km^{2} (178,700 sq mi) (54th)
  - Water (%): 2.2

Population
  - 2021 estimate: ▲11,781,559 (93rd)
  - 2024 census: 10,185,363
  - Density: 25.5/km^{2} (66.0/sq mi)
- GDP (PPP): 2025 estimate
  - Total: ▲$41.810 billion (135th)
  - Per capita: ▲$3,760 (162nd)
- GDP (nominal): 2025 estimate
  - Total: ▲$32.840 billion (108th)
  - Per capita: ▲$2,560 (142nd)
- Gini (2009): 41.9 medium inequality
- HDI (2023): ▲0.576 medium (160th)
- Currency: Kina (PGK)
- Time zone: UTC+10, +11 (PNGST)
- Calling code: +675
- ISO 3166 code: PG
- Internet TLD: .pg

Papua New Guinea (Note: /ˈpæp(j)uə ... ˈɡɪni, ˈpɑː-/, also US: /ˈpɑːpwə-, ˈpɑːp(j)ə-/) (PNG), officially the Independent State of Papua New Guinea, is an island nation in Oceania that comprises the eastern half of the island of New Guinea and offshore islands in Melanesia, a region of the southwestern Pacific Ocean north of Australia. It has a land border with Indonesia to the west and maritime borders with Australia to the south and the Solomon Islands to the east. Its capital is Port Moresby. The country's 462,840 km^{2} (178,700 mi^{2}) includes a large mainland and hundreds of islands.

The eastern half of New Guinea was divided in 1884 between German New Guinea in the north and British New Guinea in the south, with the latter ceded to Australia in 1902 and reorganised as the Territory of Papua. Australia occupied German New Guinea during World War I and then administered the territory as a League of Nations mandate. The nation was the site of fierce fighting during the New Guinea campaign of World War II, following which the two territories were united in 1949. Papua New Guinea was granted independence as a Commonwealth realm in 1975. Representing the monarch is a governor-general. Politics take place within a Westminster system, with the government led by a prime minister. Members of the National Parliament, the unicameral legislative body, also serve as provincial leaders.

The population is mostly rural, with only 14% living in urban centres in 2023. The persistence of traditional communities and lifestyles is explicitly protected by the Papua New Guinea Constitution. While official population estimates suggest the population is around 11.8 million, estimates using satellite data put the number closer to 17 million. The population is extremely diverse. There are 840 known spoken languages, making it the most linguistically diverse country in the world. Cultural practices are similarly diverse. Many cultural and linguistic groups are small, although English and Tok Pisin serve as common languages. This diversity has led to friction, especially in politics, and the government has struggled to combat violence against women. The country has a large Christian majority population, of several different denominations, and in March 2025 its constitution was amended to adopt Christianity as the official state religion.

The rural and diverse population is a result of highly mountainous geography. The land supports around 5% of all known species, and the export-driven economy is also dependent on natural resources. Papua New Guinea is a developing economy where nearly 40% of the population are subsistence farmers living relatively independently of the cash economy. The country retains close ties to Australia and has enhanced ties with both Asia and the Pacific.

== Etymology ==
"Papua" is derived from a local term of uncertain origin that may have referred to at least part of the island now called New Guinea. In 1526 Portuguese explorer Jorge de Menezes named the island Ilhas dos Papuas. The Australian government adopted the name "Territory of Papua" when it assumed control of British New Guinea in 1902, which Prime Minister Edmund Barton considered a "shorter and better name" for the territory.

"New Guinea" (Nueva Guinea) was coined by Spanish explorer Yñigo Ortiz de Retez. In 1545, he noted the resemblance of the people to those he had earlier seen along the Guinea coast of Africa. Guinea, in its turn, is etymologically derived from the Portuguese word Guiné. The name is one of several toponyms sharing similar etymologies, which likely mean "of the burnt face" or similar, in reference to the dark skin of the inhabitants. Its use in the country name comes from the Territory of New Guinea, the name adopted for German New Guinea when it became a League of Nations mandate under Australian administration.

The hyphenated form "Papua-New Guinea" was adopted by the Papua‑New Guinea Provisional Administration Act 1945, after previous use to refer to the two Australian-administered territories. The name "Territory of Papua and New Guinea" was used following formal administrative union in 1949. Beginning in the 1960s, there was considerable debate around whether the territory should adopt a new name upon independence. The indigenised name "Niugini" won a 1968 competition held by the South Pacific Post and was adopted by several nationalist groups, while "Pagini" was favoured by a parliamentary committee into constitutional development. In 1971, the House of Assembly renamed the territory "Papua New Guinea", which was retained upon independence.

== History ==
=== First settlement ===
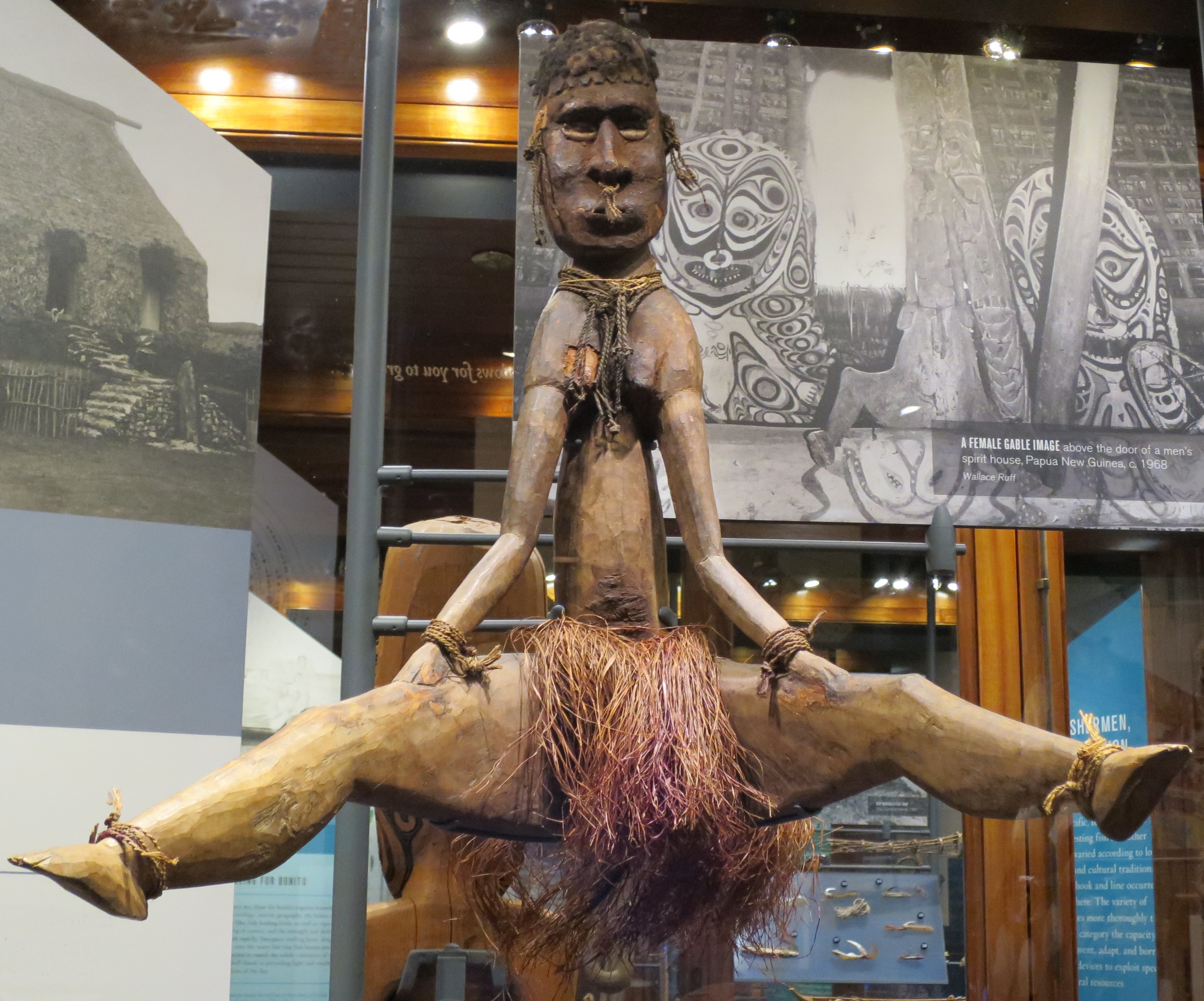
Female gable image, Sawos people, Oceanic art in the Bishop Museum

Archaeological evidence indicates that modern humans first arrived in what became New Guinea and Australia, as well as the Bismarck Archipelago, around 42,000 to 45,000 years ago. Bougainville Island was settled by around 28,000 years ago, and the more distant Manus Island by around 20,000 years ago. These were part of the earliest migrations of humans from Africa, and the resulting populations remained relatively isolated from the rest of the world throughout prehistory. Rising sea levels isolated New Guinea from Australia about 10,000 years ago, although Aboriginal Australians and New Guineans had already diverged from each other from about 37,000 years ago.

Agriculture was independently developed in the New Guinea highlands around 7000 BC, making it one of the few areas in the world where people independently domesticated plants. Before the onset of full-scale agriculture, some plants had already been domesticated, including sago, Canarium indicum, and karuka. Archaeological evidence shows that Austronesian-speaking peoples of the Lapita culture reached the Bismarck Archipelago by 3,300 years ago. It is unknown whether they also settled on the mainland at this time, but there is strong evidence of their presence in coastal areas from around 500 BC. These communities interacted with larger trade networks. It is likely through these trading networks that banana and sugarcane moved from New Guinea to other areas of the world.

Trade became rarer around 300 AD, as demand for goods shifted to the Maluku Islands and Timor. After European interest in the region grew in the 16th century, Dutch influence grew over the Sultanate of Tidore. As Dutch authorities become more interested in New Guinea, they confirmed and extended the sultanate's claims over western New Guinea. Renewed trade began to spread to the eastern parts of New Guinea in the late 17th century, driven by demand for goods such as dammar gum, sea cucumbers, pearls, copra, shells, and bird-of-paradise feathers.

On New Guinea, communities were economically linked through trading networks. Despite this, aside from some political alliances, each community functioned largely independently, relying on subsistence agriculture. Goods were often traded along established chains, and some villagers would be familiar with and sometimes know the languages of the immediately neighbouring villages (although language by itself was not a marker of political allegiance). Some wider trading networks existed in maritime areas. While people did not move far along these routes, goods moved long distances through local exchanges, and cultural practices likely diffused along them. Despite these links, the creation of larger political entities under European rule had no precedent, and in many cases brought together communities that historically had antagonistic relationships, or no relationship at all.

=== European influence ===
It is likely that some ships from China and Southeast Asia visited the island at times and that there was some contact with New Guinean communities. Portuguese explorer António de Abreu was the first European to discover the island of New Guinea. Portuguese traders introduced the South American sweet potato to the Moluccas. From there, it likely spread to New Guinea sometime in the 17th century, initially from the southern coast. It spread inland to the highlands and became a staple food. The introduction of the sweet potato, possibly alongside other agricultural changes, transformed traditional agriculture and societies. This likely led to the spread of the big man social structure. Sweet potato largely supplanted the previous staple, taro, and led to significant population growth in the highlands.

New Guinea from 1884 to 1902. Germany and Britain controlled the eastern half of New Guinea.

By the 19th century, there was some trade with the Dutch East Indies. Beginning in the 1860s, people from New Guinea were effectively taken as slaves to Queensland and Fiji as part of the blackbirding trade. This was stopped in 1884. Most of those taken were from coastal Papua. Those who returned to New Guinea brought their experiences with Western culture with them, but the largest impact was the development of a Melanesian Pidgin that would eventually become the Tok Pisin language.

Christianity was introduced on 15 September 1847 when a group of Marist missionaries went to Woodlark Island. Missions were the primary source of Western culture as well as religion. The western half of the island was annexed by the Netherlands in 1848. The nearby Torres Strait Islands were annexed by Queensland in 1878, and Queensland attempted to annex some of New Guinea in 1883. The eastern half was divided between Germany in the north and the United Kingdom in the south in 1884. The German New Guinea Company had initially tried to develop plantations, but when this was not successful began to engage in barter trade. In the British area, gold was found near the Mambare River in 1895.

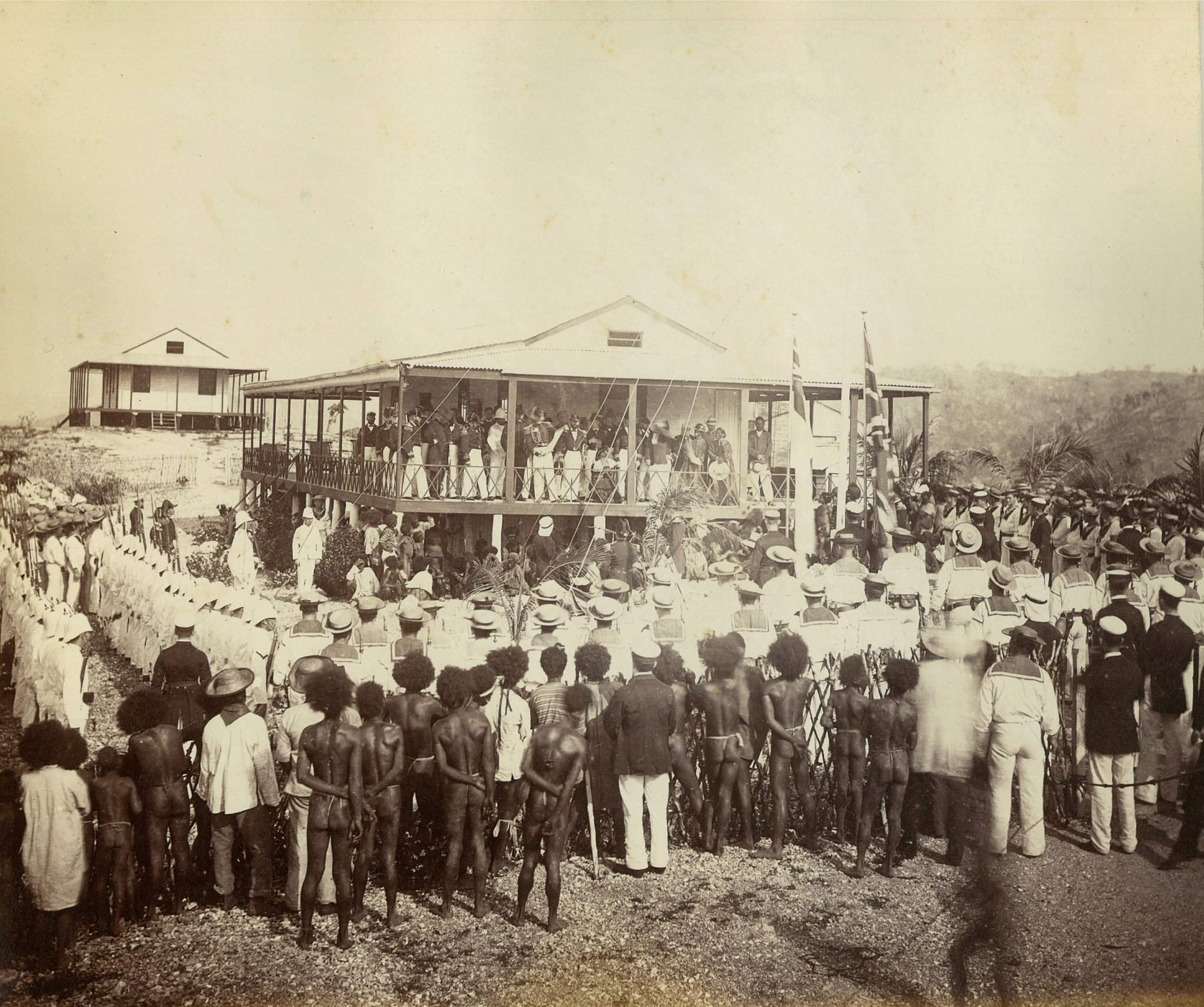
British annexation of southeast New Guinea in 1884

In 1888, the British protectorate was annexed by Britain. In 1902, Papua was effectively transferred to the authority of the newly federated British dominion of Australia. With the passage of the Papua Act 1905, the area was officially renamed the Territory of Papua, and the Australian administration became formal in 1906, with Papua becoming fully annexed as an Australian territory.

Under European rule, social relations amongst the New Guinean population changed. Tribal fighting decreased, while in new urban areas there was greater mixing as people moved to partake in the cash crop economy. The large inequality between colonial administrators and locals led to the emergence of what colonial governments called cargo cults. One of the most significant impacts was to changes in local travel. Colonial authorities outlawed tribal warfare, and it became normal to move for work, while roads increased the connectivity between inland areas.

Colonial authorities generally worked with individual village representatives, although neither German nor British authorities developed an effective system of indirect rule. In German New Guinea Tok Pisin began to spread through local adoption and was reluctantly used by German authorities. In areas under British and then Australian governance, Hiri Motu, a pidgin version of the Motu language, became established as a de facto official language.

Following the outbreak of World War I in 1914, Australian forces captured German New Guinea and occupied it throughout the war. After the end of the war, the League of Nations authorised Australia to administer this area as a Class "C" League of Nations mandate territory from 9 May 1921, which became the Territory of New Guinea. The Territory of Papua and the Mandate of New Guinea were administered separately. Gold was discovered in Bulolo in the 1920s, and prospectors searched other areas of the island. The highland valleys were explored by prospectors in the 1930s and were found to be inhabited by over a million people.

=== World War II and Australian rule ===
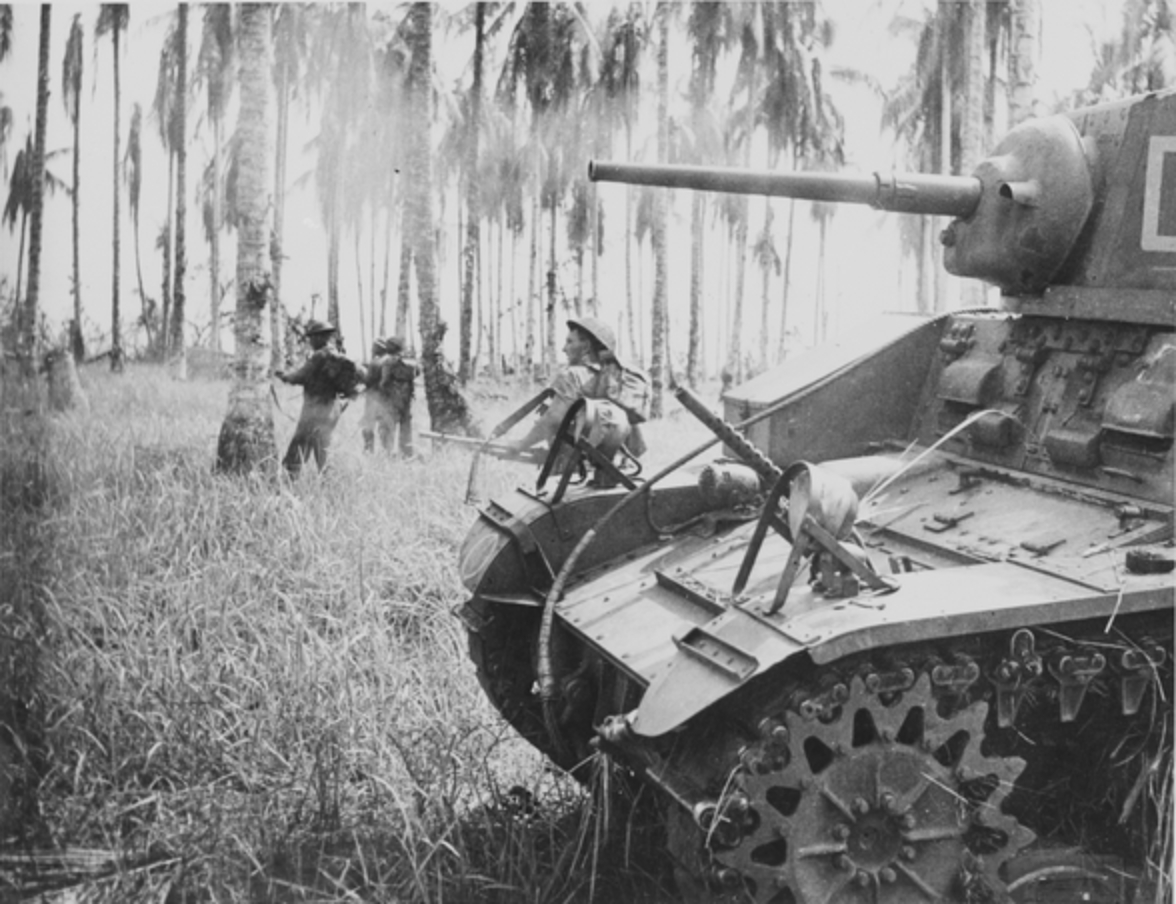
Australian forces attack Japanese positions during the Battle of Buna–Gona, 7 January 1943.

During World War II, Japanese forces sought to capture Port Moresby, invading overland in mid-1942 and moving south in the Kokoda Track campaign. Australian forces carried out rearguard actions as they withdrew almost to Port Moresby. In September an Australian counter-offensive began, and Japanese forces fought rearguard actions as they retreated north. Australian forces were supported during this campaign through significant contributions from local soldiers and helpers. While this campaign was ongoing, the Japanese launched the Battle of Milne Bay, where their attack was repulsed by Australian and American forces. These events, along with the nearby Guadalcanal campaign, marked a turning point in the Pacific War. A war of attrition continued until 1944, when allied forces fully recaptured Papua and New Guinea. In total, the New Guinea campaign resulted in the deaths of approximately 216,000 Japanese, Australian, and U.S. servicemen on both the mainland and offshore islands.

During the war, the civil government of both territories was suspended and replaced by a joint military government. The Second World War punctured the myth of differences between locals and foreigners and increased the exposure of the population to the wider world and modern social and economic ideas. It also led to significant population movements, beginning the establishment of a common identity shared by those in the two Australian-ruled territories. Both Tok Pisin and Hiri Motu became more common to facilitate communication and were used for radio broadcasts. The war was the first time Tok Pisin became widely spread in Papua. The joint governance of both territories that was established during the war was continued after the war ended.

In 1946, New Guinea was declared a United Nations trust territory under Australian governance. In 1949 Papuans became Australian citizens, and Australia formally combined Papua and New Guinea into the Territory of Papua and New Guinea. The Legislative Council of Papua and New Guinea was created in November 1951. Village councils were first created in both Papua and in New Guinea starting 1949, with the number steadily increasing over the years. These created alternative power structures, which while sometimes filled by traditional leaders, saw the beginning of a shift towards leaders with administrative or business experience.

The political aims of Australian rule were uncertain, with independence and becoming an Australian state both seen as possible futures. The 1960s and 1970s saw significant social changes as more of the population began to participate in the formal economy, leading to the development of a more local bureaucracy. Alongside this, Australian administrators promoted a shared national identity. English was introduced by Australian authorities as a potential unifying language, and many Papua New Guineans viewed it as a prestige language.

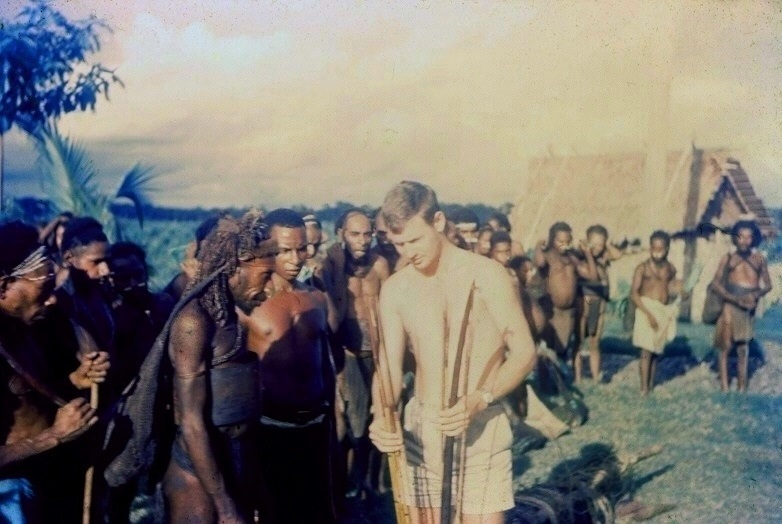
Australian patrol officer in 1964

Aerial surveys in the 1950s found further inhabited valleys in the highlands. The re-establishment of Australian administration following the war was followed by an expansion of that control, including over the previously mostly uncontrolled highland areas. Some tribes remained uncontacted by Westerners until the 1960s and 1970s. The administration of the highlands led to a large expansion of coffee cultivation in the region. The 1964 election and 1968 election took place alongside campaigns to introduce the political system. The leadup to the 1968 election saw the formation of Pangu Pati, the first political party.

Mining exploration by Rio Tinto in Bougainville began in 1964. In spite of resistance from some local landowners, the Bougainville Copper corporation was established and began to operate a large mine. Resistance became interlinked with a desire for greater autonomy. Bougainville was geographically close to the British Solomon Islands, and its people are more culturally linked to those of the Solomon Islands than to others in the territory. However, the mine was seen as crucial for diversifying the economic base of Papua New Guinea from agriculture alone.

Australian opposition leader Gough Whitlam visited Papua New Guinea in 1969. Whitlam made self-rule in the territory an election issue and called for self-governance as early as 1972. In March 1971 the House of Assembly recommended that the territory seek self-governance in the next parliament, which was agreed to by Australia. In June 1971, the flag and emblem were adopted. In July, the "and" was removed and the territory was renamed to simply "Papua New Guinea".

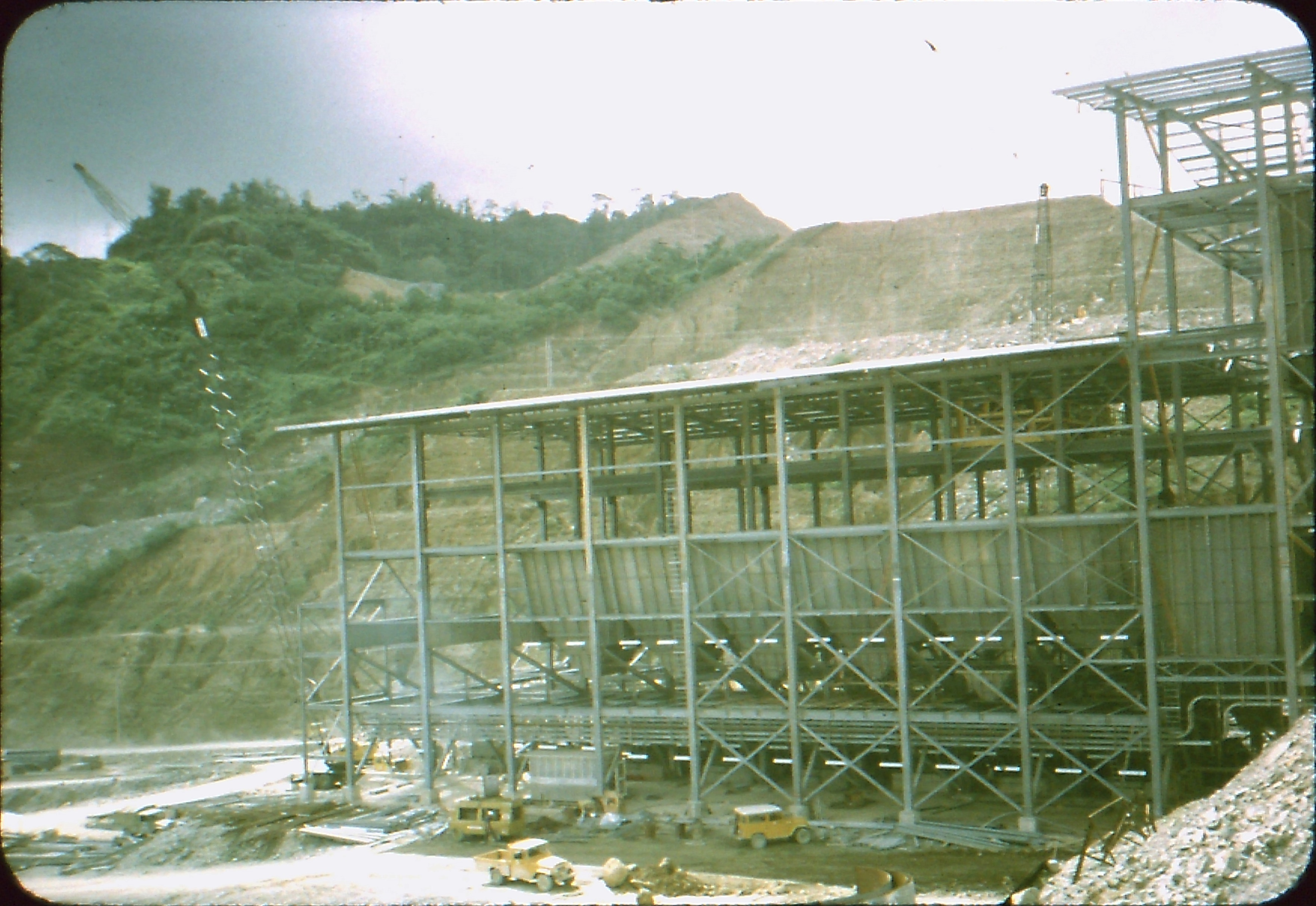
The Panguna mine on Bougainville Island in 1971

Following the time of Whitlam's first visit, political debate significantly intensified alongside significant social changes. At the 1972 Papua New Guinean general election, Michael Somare was elected as chief minister. Somare sought a better relationship with regional movements, which increased the number of local groups but also decreased their salience and encouraged them to join the national political system. Whitlam was elected as prime minister at the 1972 Australian federal election. The Whitlam government instituted self-governance in late 1973. The kina was introduced as a separate currency in 1975.

The push for independence was driven by internal policies of the Whitlam government, rather than responding to particular calls from Papua New Guinea. The concept of a "country" remained foreign to many in the territory, and there was no strong shared national identity. In the early 1970s there were fears that independence would allow for large tribes to dominate others, and create more risk of foreign land acquisition. The subsequent creation of a local consensus for independence was due to the actions of local political leaders. On 1 September 1975, shortly before the scheduled date of Papua New Guinean independence, the government of Bougainville declared independence. Payments to the province were suspended in response. Other regional movements emerged prior to independence. The Papua Besena party sought to separate the territory of Papua from New Guinea, while the Highlands Liberation Front sought to prevent dominance of highland areas by the coast. Smaller groups advocated for the creation of new provinces. Nonetheless, the Papua New Guinea Independence Act 1975 passed, setting 16 September 1975 as the date of independence. Somare continued as the country's first prime minister.

=== Independence ===
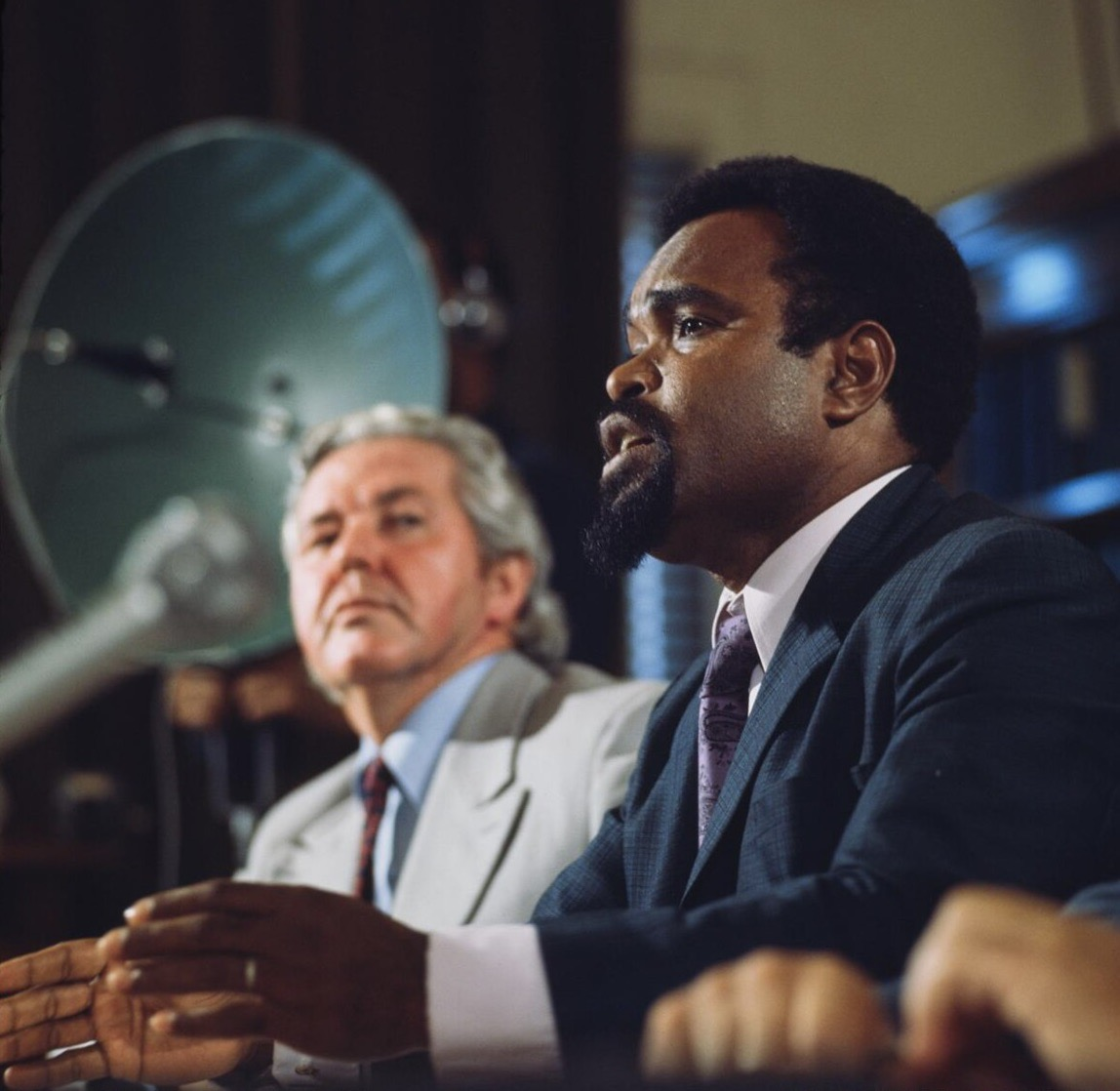
Michael Somare in 1973 alongside Bill Morrison, Minister for External Territories of the Whitlam government

Upon independence, most Australian officials—including agricultural, economic, educational, and medicinal staff—left the territory. Very little training had been provided to their successors. This led to a restructuring and a loss of efficiency, particularly in serving rural areas. By the 1980s, the civil service, including the military, had become politicised, decreasing effectiveness and accountability.

The voting system was changed to first-past-the-post voting, as an unsuccessful attempt to encourage the development of a two-party system with clearly defined political parties. National governments changed through constitutional means. Somare retained the prime ministership following the 1977 election; he was ousted through a vote of no confidence in 1980 and was replaced by Julius Chan. Somare became prime minister again following the 1982 election but lost another vote of no confidence in 1985.

Although an August 1976 agreement with the national government resolved the initial declaration of independence, the issue of Bougainville persisted past independence. A secessionist movement in 1975–76 on Bougainville Island resulted in a modification of the Constitution of Papua New Guinea, with the Organic Law on Provincial Government legally devolving power to the 19 provinces. Following instances of provincial government mismanagement, Somare's proposal to reduce provincial government power brought further threats of secession from some of the country's island provinces.

While warfare significantly decreased under Australian governance, tribal fighting in the highland areas increased in the 1970s. These areas had been under outside control for less time, meaning former tribal conflict was still remembered and restarted upon independence. The first state of emergency was declared in 1979, although it and similar interventions did not quell the violence. Unemployment and imbalanced gender ratios in cities meant tribal fighting morphed into the emergence of gangs. Gang violence led to a state of emergency in Port Moresby in 1984, which led to the intervention of the Papua New Guinea Defence Force (PNGDF). The effectiveness of this deployment led to further police and military interventions elsewhere. Both the police and military became more politicised and less disciplined. Demand for private security increased as a response, and foreign investment was deterred. In 1995, provincial governments were reformed, becoming made up of relevant national MPs and a number of appointed members. Some of their responsibilities were devolved towards local governments, a factor that caused significant controversy due to an expected lack of capacity at this level. This lack of capacity has meant that national MPs gained significant powers at the local level.

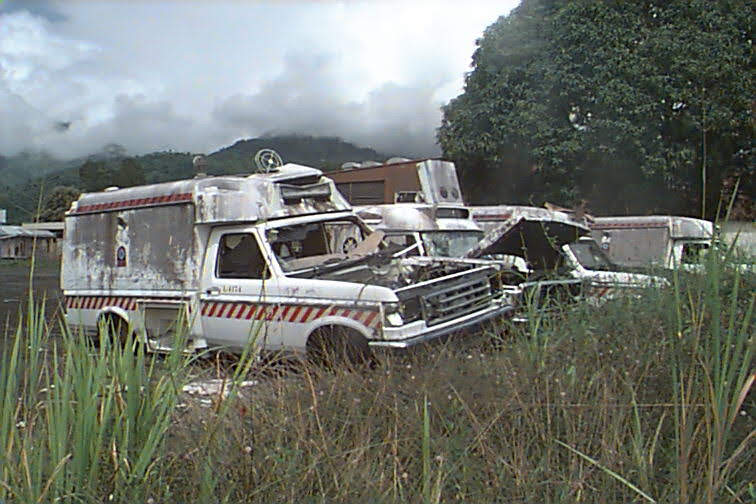
The town of Arawa was destroyed during the Bougainville conflict.

The employment needs of the Bougainville mine decreased after construction was completed, meaning younger individuals received little benefit from the presence of the mine. A renewed uprising on Bougainville started in 1988, fighting against both the Bougainville government and the national government. After the mine closed in May 1989, the Bougainville Revolutionary Army (BRA) declared independence, and the national government pulled out in 1990 and blockaded the province, the conflict shifted into a complex internal civil war. National security forces re-entered the island at the end of 1990, and together with local allies slowly gained more control. An agreement between the government and some rebels was reached in October 1994, and in 1995 a transitional Bougainville government was established, although fighting continued with the BRA. In 1997, the Sandline affair over the hiring of mercenaries to intervene in Bougainville brought down the national government. Following New Zealand-mediated peace talks, a ceasefire was reached in January 1998.

The first decade of independence saw slow but steady economic growth. The Ok Tedi Mine opened in 1982. While Australian contribution to the budget dropped from 40% of government revenue in 1975 to 17% in 1988, improved taxation allowed for government expenditure to be maintained. The closure of the Bougainville mine led to issues with government finances, however an expansion of exports of oil, minerals, and forestry products led to economic recovery in the early 1990s. This growth did not decrease inequality however, and government services declined. Increasing government expense and resulting rising debt led to significant economic trouble. The Papua New Guinean kina was devalued and put on a floating exchange rate in 1994, and the country obtained an emergency loan from the World Bank in 1995.

In the 1997 election, only 4 candidates won overall majorities, with 95 (87%) of winners receiving less than 30% of the vote. After government changed mid-parliament in 1999, a Constitutional Development Commission was established to bring about political reform. The resulting Organic Law on the Integrity of Political Parties and Candidates created public funding for registered parties, incentivised the selection of female candidates, and instituted punishments for party hopping. It also barred independent MPs from voting for the prime minister, or from joining coalitions before a prime minister is elected. Another measure was to begin a shift from first past the post to a Limited Preferential Vote system (LPV), a version of the alternative vote.

The Bougainville Peace Agreement was signed in 2001, under which Bougainville would gain higher autonomy than other provinces, and an independence referendum would be held in the future. The 2002 election saw an uptick in violence. Australian police were brought to PNG to help train PNG police in 2004. While most left the next year after a Supreme Court ruling, this began a long-term Australian police presence in the country. In 2009, Parliament approved the creation of two additional provinces: Hela Province, consisting of part of the existing Southern Highlands Province, and Jiwaka Province, formed by dividing Western Highlands Province.

In 2011, there was a constitutional crisis between the parliament-elect Prime Minister, Peter O'Neill (voted into office by a large majority of MPs), and Somare, who was deemed by the supreme court to retain office. The parliament voted to delay the upcoming elections, however they did not have the constitutional authority to do this, and the Papua New Guinea Electoral Commission continued to prepare. The 2012 national elections went ahead as scheduled, and O'Neill was once again elected as prime minister by a majority of parliament. Somare joined O'Neill's government, charges against the court judges and others who supported Somare were dropped, and legislation asserting control of the judiciary and that affecting the office of the prime minister was repealed.

Liquefied natural gas exports began in 2014, however falling prices as well as lower oil prices meant that government revenue was lower than expected. The debt-to-GDP ratio rose, and as of 2019, Papua New Guinea's HDI rating was the lowest in the Pacific. In March 2015 the Bougainville Mining Act shifted control over mining from the national government to the Bougainville government. It also stated that minerals belonged to customary landowners rather than the state, giving landowners veto power over future extraction.

The 2012–2017 O'Neill government was dogged by corruption scandals. The 2017 general election saw O'Neill return as prime minister, although initially with a smaller coalition. This election saw widespread voter intimidation in some regions, and delays in the reporting of seat results. Financial scandals, as well as criticism of the purchase of expensive cars for APEC Papua New Guinea 2018 meeting, created pressure on O'Neill and led to defections from government. In May 2019, O'Neill resigned as prime minister and was replaced by James Marape.

The government set 23 November 2019 as the voting date for a non-binding independence referendum in the Bougainville autonomous region. Voters overwhelmingly voted for independence (98.31%). Prime Minister James Marape's PANGU Party secured the most seats of any party in the 2022 election, enabling him to continue as PNG's Prime Minister.

== Government and politics ==
The Head of State and King of Papua New Guinea:
Charles III
since
9 September 2022

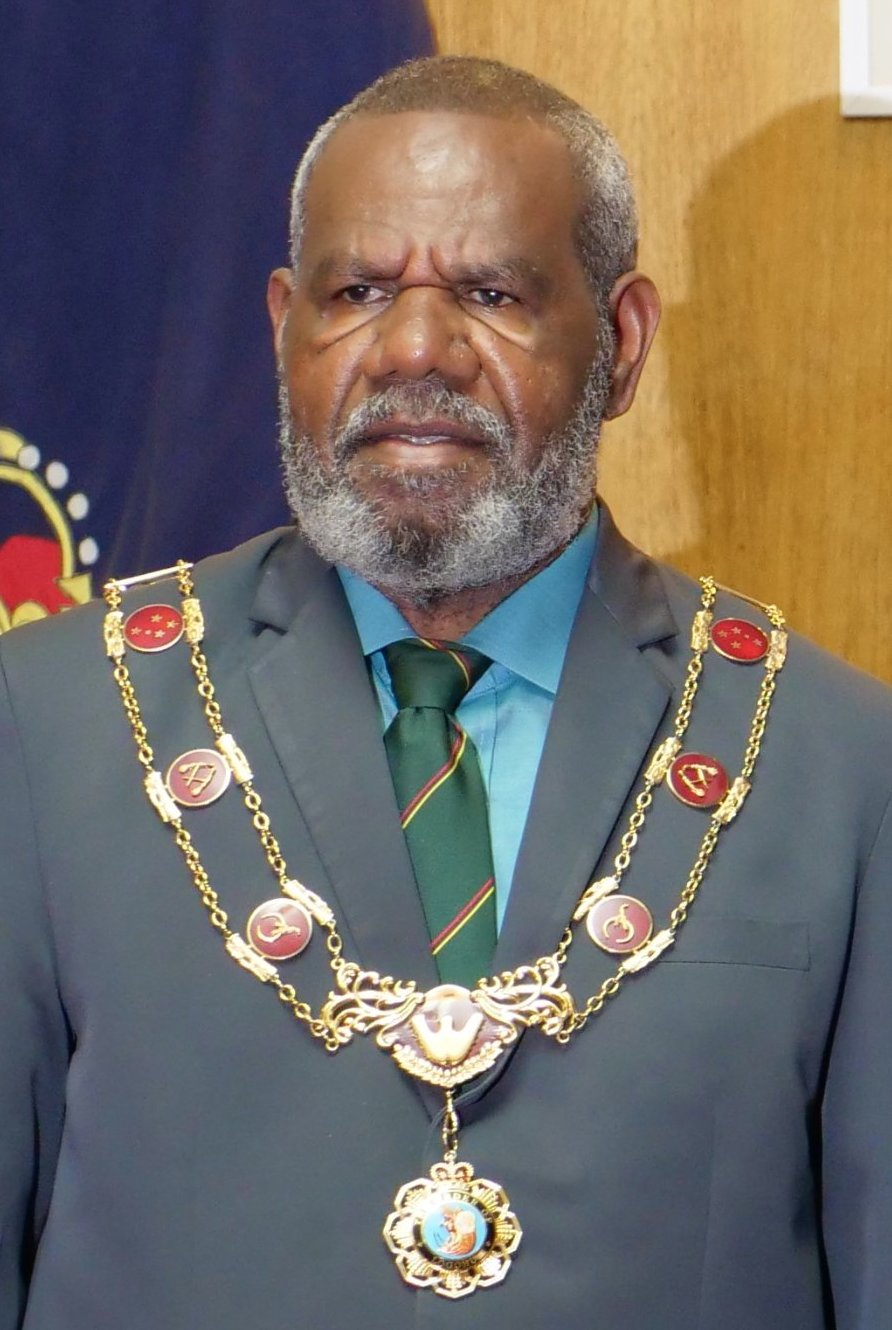
The Governor-General of Papua New Guinea:
Bob Dadae
since
28 February 2017

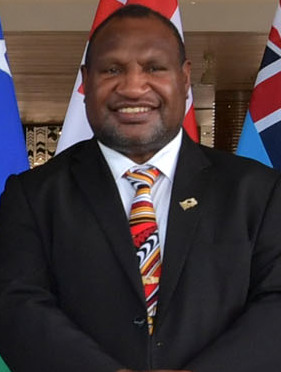
The Prime Minister of Papua New Guinea:
James Marape
since
30 May 2019

Papua New Guinea is a Commonwealth realm with Charles III as king. The monarch's representative is the governor-general of Papua New Guinea, who is elected by the unicameral National Parliament of Papua New Guinea. The National Parliament elects the prime minister of Papua New Guinea, who is then appointed by the governor-general. The other ministers are appointed by the governor-general on the prime minister's advice and form the National Executive Council of Papua New Guinea, which acts as the country's cabinet. The National Parliament sits for a maximum of five years. It has 118 seats, with 96 representing districts, and 22 representing province-level electorates (20 provinces, the National Capital District, and the Autonomous Region of Bougainville) who serve as governors of those provinces.

Papua New Guinea has maintained continuous democratic elections and changes in government since independence. While seat results are often contested, the overall results of elections are accepted. Elections in PNG attract numerous candidates. Voting takes place through the Limited Preferential Vote system (LPV), a version of the alternative vote. Under this system, voters must give preference votes for at least three candidates.

While political parties exist, they are not ideologically differentiated. Instead they generally reflect the alliances made between their members, and have little relevance outside of elections. All governments since 1972 have been coalitions. When formed, such coalitions are unstable due to the potential for party hopping, referred to as "yo-yo" politics. Almost all parties have formed coalitions with the others, and some coalitions have consisted of up to 10 separate parties. Ministerial positions are valuable, and constituents may often have little issue with their elected representatives switching parties to join the government, as it gives their district more representation. Ministerial tenures are often short, averaging half the length of a parliament from 1972 to 2016. The average time a minister spends at a particular portfolio is even shorter, at just 16 months. Political parties can have MPs in government while others remain in opposition. Opposition MPs have been appointed to government. For the first couple of decades of independence, there was at least one change of government within each parliamentary period. In total, only two prime ministers have finished a full term from election to election. Votes of no confidence are common, and while few are successful, multiple prime ministers have pre-emptively resigned to try to engineer reselection or adjourned parliament to avoid them.

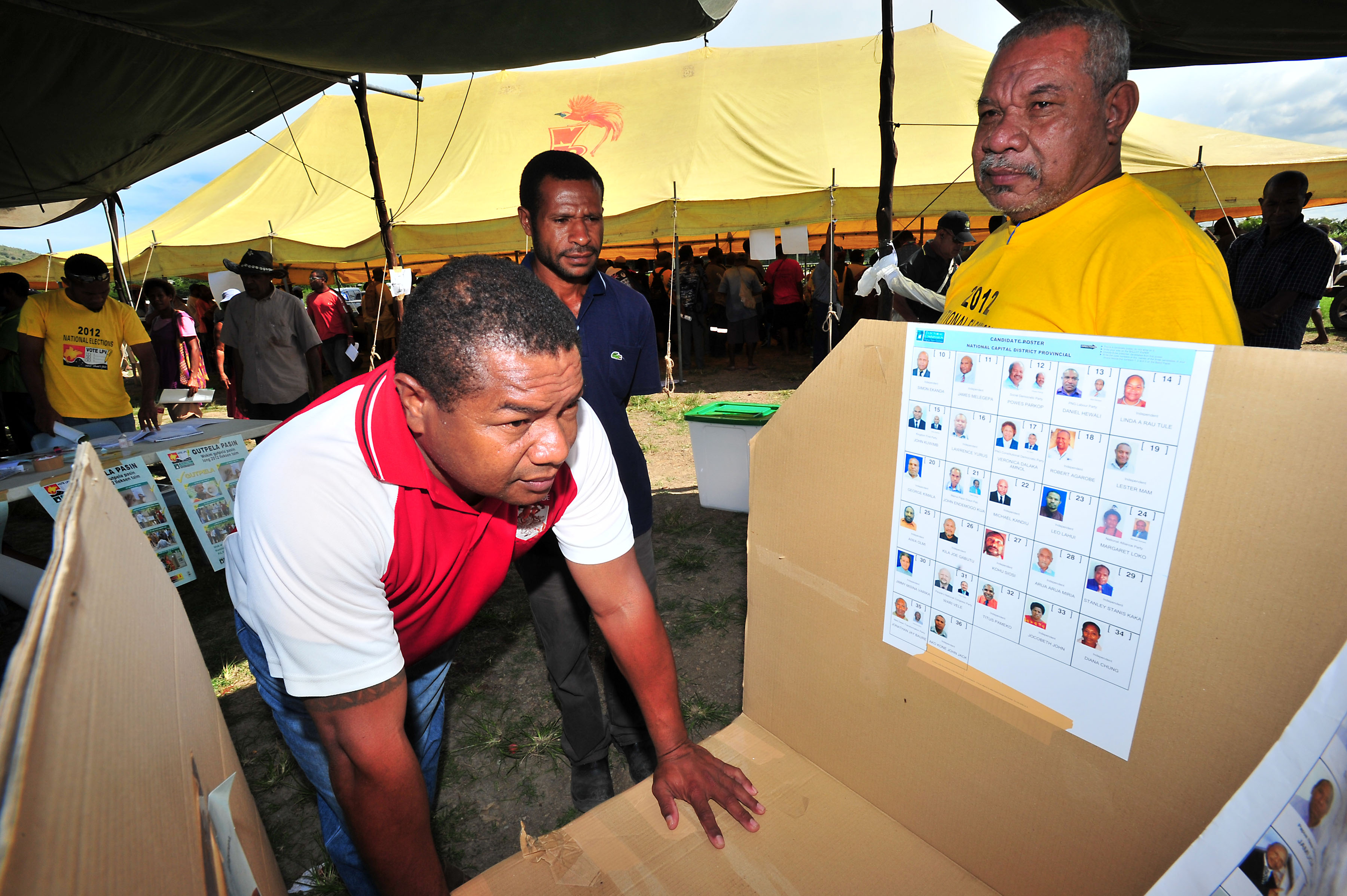
Elections in Papua New Guinea attract large numbers of candidates.

Changes in government mostly affected patronage and individual positions, rather than changing government priorities and programmes. Due to this, despite the fractiousness of politics, policy is relatively stable. Many parties might run on similar platforms, weakening policy debate, as candidates campaign on local representation rather than political differences. The support bases of political parties are usually personal or geographical. Even when nominally national parties emerge, they are often strong in specific regions. Most parties exist only for a short time, and are highly dependent on their leaders. The lack of strong parties lasting between elections contributes to poor finances, meaning parties cannot really support candidates outside of personal funds from party leaders. A weak parliament has also strengthened the executive, a process exacerbated by governments using procedural methods to control parliament. An increasing reliance on judicial methods to combat the government has increased the risk of the judiciary being seen as politicised.

The political culture is influenced by existing kinship and village ties, with communalism an important cultural factor given the many small and fragmented communities. Regional and local identities are strong, and traditional politics has integrated with the modern political system. There is a broad Papuan regional identity, and to some extent a highlands one, which can affect politics. However, outside of Bougainville, regional politics are autonomist rather than separatist, with separatism often used as rhetoric rather than as an ultimate goal. The importance of community ties to their land are reflected in the legal system, with 97% of the country designated as customary land, held by communities. Many such effective titles remain unregistered and effectively informal.

Voting often occurs along tribal lines, an issue exacerbated by politicians who might be able to win off the small vote share provided by a unified tribe. Political intimidation and violence are common. Politicians have been prevented from campaigning where tribes support a rival candidate, and candidates are sometimes put up by opponents to split a different tribe's vote. Bloc voting is practiced by some communities, especially in the highlands. Large numbers of independent candidates means that winners are often elected on very small pluralities, including winning less than 10% of votes. Such results raise concerns about the mandates provided by elections.

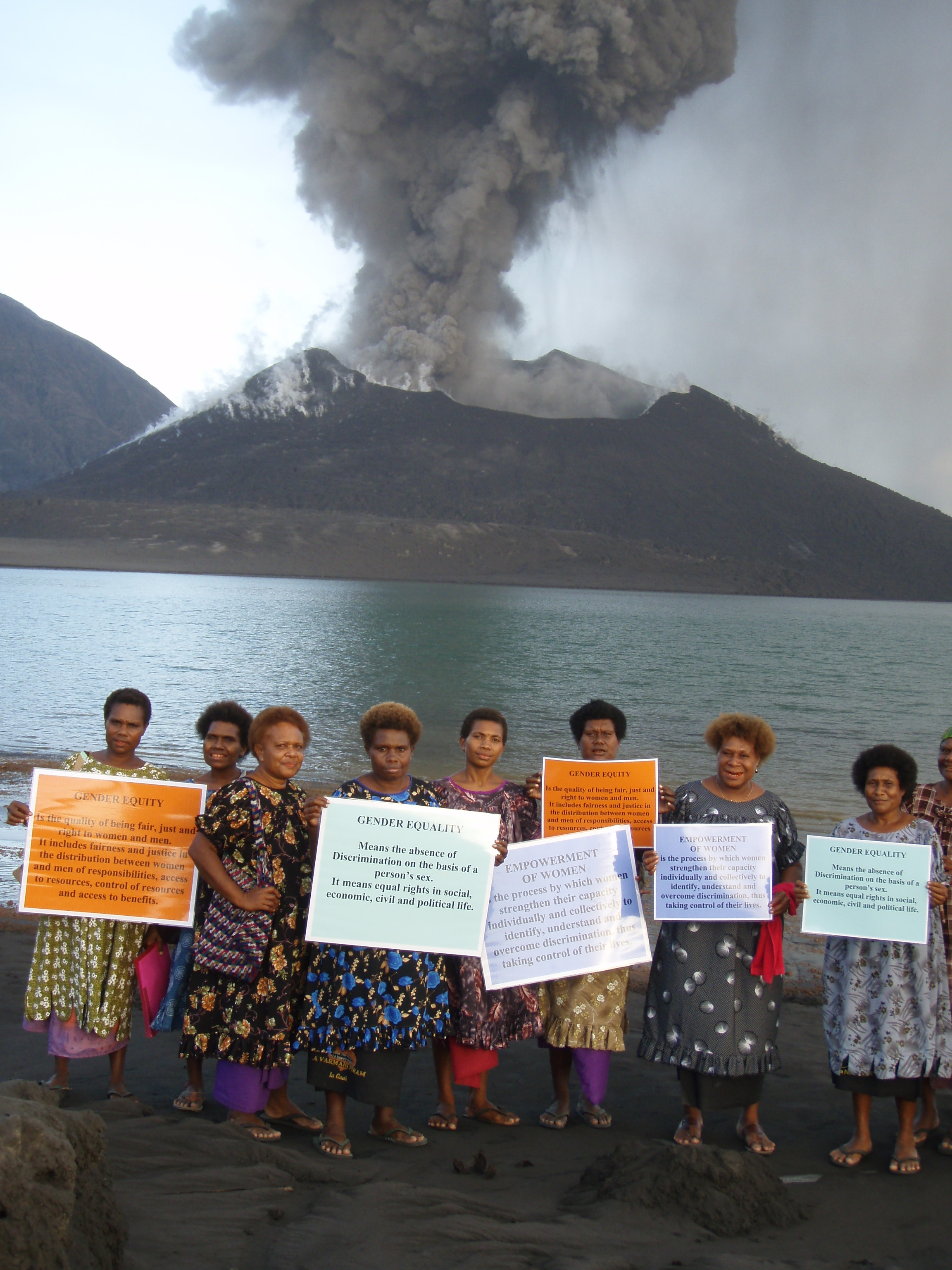
Very few women are elected to the Papua New Guinean parliament.

In every election prior to at least 2004, the majority of incumbents lost their seats. This has created an incentive for newly elected politicians to seek as much personal advantage as possible within their term. Each MP controls Rural Development Funds for their constituency, providing easy opportunities for corruption. It also means many prioritise new expenditure, rather than delivering existing services. The total amount of funding under the discretionary control of each MP is amongst the highest in the world. This has generated significant cynicism, and reduced the perceived legitimacy of the national government. The control of such funds may also contribute to commonality and severity of electoral violence. Other challenges to elections include issues with administration, issues with electoral rolls, and vote buying. The provision of constituency funds to MPs has been delayed by prime ministers to influence coalition-building.

Corruption is a widespread issue. While notable instances have been identified amongst high-profile individuals, spreading petty corruption has likely had a greater effect of degrading government services. While some corruption is for personal gain, other corruption emerges from the social obligations of the wantok system, with constituents expecting reciprocal benefits and loyalty from their elected officials and from others in their communities and kin networks. Politicians jailed for corruption have been re-elected, as their corrupt activities were seen as an expected part of benefiting their communities. This clash of individual community expectations and local acceptance of what might be called corruption with widespread disillusionment over national corruption is likely one reason that anti-corruption actions rarely match political rhetoric. These cultural expectations also sometimes clash with the formal legal and political system which inherited Australian norms. Resentment of elites and clear inequality also drive expectations of patronage.

The control of constituency funds has also resulted in MPs being seen as individually responsible for the delivery of government services, especially as few other pathways for government services exist, compounding the cultural importance of expectations of rewards for voting for a winning candidate. This responsibility for services is thought to contribute to high levels of absenteeism in parliament, and thus means MPs are not able to effectively act as lawmakers within the Westminster system of government. Instability in parliament further hampers lawmaking, leaving laws out of date. Constituency boundaries are the same as administrative boundaries, strengthening the conceptual link between elections and service provisions. This also distorts politics, by making electoral boundaries unresponsive to changes in population. Rural communities have a much more difficult time accessing government services, with facilities such as banking sometimes being days of travel away. In some rural areas, villages have little interaction with the state.

Litigation has become common, increasing the cost of the judicial system. Government infrastructure, including schools and airstrips, often lead to demands for compensation from local communities, impeding development and creating local tensions. Media is generally free, but weak.

=== Foreign relations ===
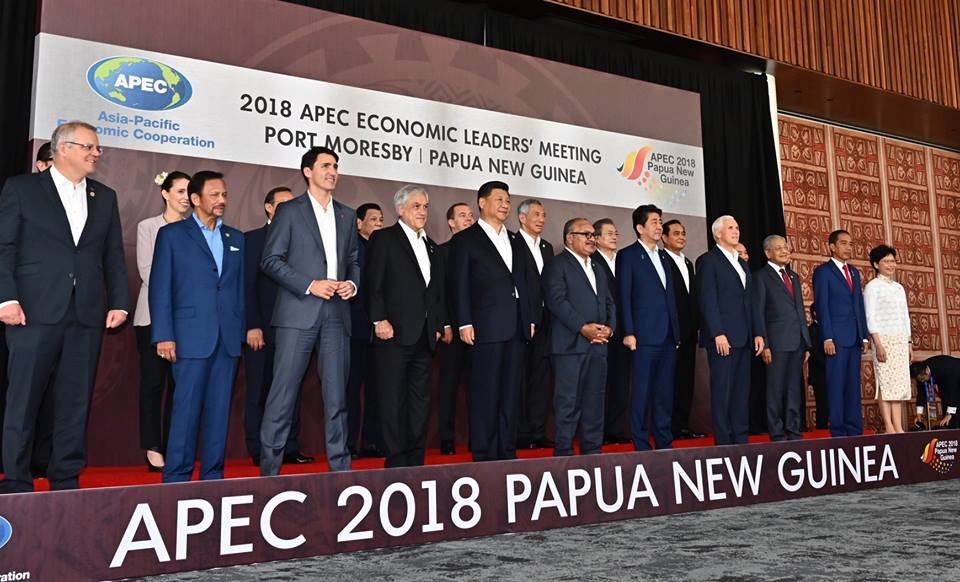
APEC 2018 in Papua New Guinea

Papua New Guinea has sought to maintain good relations with its neighbours Australia, Indonesia, and the Solomon Islands, while also building links to Asian countries to the north. Tensions sometimes emerge with Australia due to changes in aid, while regional conflicts have complicated relations with the Solomon Islands and Indonesia, due to the Bougainville conflict and the Papua conflict respectively. In 1986, Papua New Guinea became a founding member of the Melanesian Spearhead Group alongside the Solomon Islands and Vanuatu, and the three signed a formal cooperation agreement in 1988. Cooperation treaties were signed with Indonesia in 1986 and Australia in 1987.

Papua New Guinea has recognised and supported Indonesia's control of neighbouring Western New Guinea, the focus of the Papua conflict where numerous human rights violations have reportedly been committed by the Indonesian security forces. Residents of border communities may cross it for customary purposes. Australia remains linked to Papua New Guinea through institutional and cultural ties, and has remained the most consistent provider of foreign aid, as well as providing peacekeeping and security assistance. There are growing ties to China, mostly as a source of infrastructure investments. The strategic position of the country, linking Southeast Asia to the Pacific, has increased geopolitical interest in the 21st century.

Papua New Guinea has been an observer state in the Association of Southeast Asian Nations (ASEAN) since 1976, followed later by special observer status in 1981. It has filed its application for full membership status. Papua New Guinea is a member of the Non-Aligned Movement, the Commonwealth of Nations, the Pacific Islands Forum, APEC, and the United Nations.

=== Crime and human rights ===
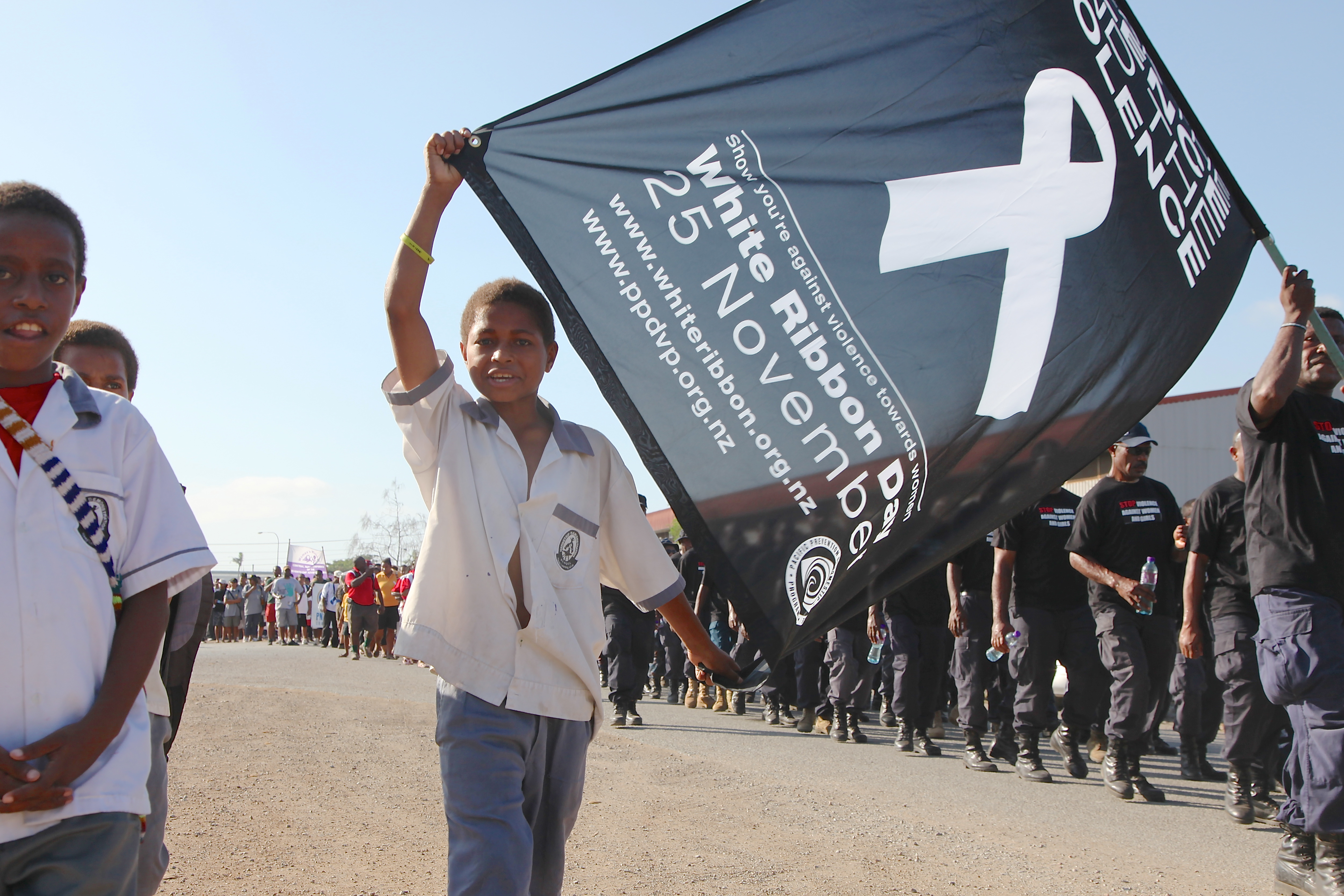
Papua New Guinean children, men and women show their support for putting an end to violence against women during a White Ribbon Day march.

Papua New Guinea is considered to have one of the highest rates of violence against women in the world, with widespread domestic and sexual violence affecting women and children. Nearly 60% of women and girls (aged 15–49) in Papua New Guinea have experienced some form of physical sexual violence in their lifetime. Such violence imposes both personal and communal costs, and is likely a reason why female participation in politics is the lowest in the region, and deters parents from sending their daughters to school. The 1971 Sorcery Act allowed for accusations of sorcery to act as a defence for murder until the act was repealed in 2013. An estimated 50–150 alleged witches are killed each year in Papua New Guinea. Homosexual acts are prohibited by law in Papua New Guinea.

While tribal violence has long been a way of life in the highlands regions, an increase in firearms has led to greater loss of life. In the past, rival groups had been known to use axes, bush knives and traditional weapons, while respecting rules of engagement that prevented violence while hunting or at markets. These norms have been changing with a greater uptake of firearms. The smuggling and theft of ammunition have also increased violence in these regions. The police forces and military find it difficult to maintain control. Violence between raskol gangs occurs in both urban and rural areas, and some gangs have become linked to politicians. Raskol violence has depressed economic activity in rural areas.

The Royal Papua New Guinea Constabulary is responsible for maintaining law and order. It has been challenged in this as more advanced weaponry exacerbates tribal conflicts, as well as being unable to prevent violence against women. These challenges are compounded by underfunding, which has contributed to low morale. Issues have been raised regarding human rights abuses and destruction of property as a result of police actions. The constabulary has been troubled by infighting, political interference, and corruption.

=== Administrative divisions ===
While Papua New Guinea is a unitary state, it is highly decentralised. The country is divided between four regions, although these are not used as administrative divisions. The nation has 22 province-level divisions: twenty provinces, the Autonomous Region of Bougainville and the National Capital District. Each province is divided into districts (89 in total), which in turn are divided into one or more Local-Level Government areas (LLGs). There are over 300 LLGs, which are divided between a small number of urban LLGs and rural LLGs, which have slightly different governance structures. The smallest province by size and population, Manus, has just one coterminous district. Provinces are the primary administrative divisions of the country, with provincial governments consisting of the national MPs elected from that province. Local governments function parallel to traditional tribal leadership. They are very dissimilar in population: the most populous six make up half of the national population, while the smallest six make up 14%. Provinces can levy their own taxes, and have some control over education, health, and development. The province-level divisions are as follows:

1. Central
2. Chimbu (Simbu)
3. Eastern Highlands
4. East New Britain
5. East Sepik
6. Enga
7. Gulf
8. Madang
9. Manus
10. Milne Bay
11. Morobe
12. New Ireland
13. Northern (Oro Province)
14. Bougainville (autonomous region)
15. Southern Highlands
16. Western Province (Fly)
17. Western Highlands
18. West New Britain
19. West Sepik (Sandaun)
20. National Capital District (Port Moresby)
21. Hela
22. Jiwaka

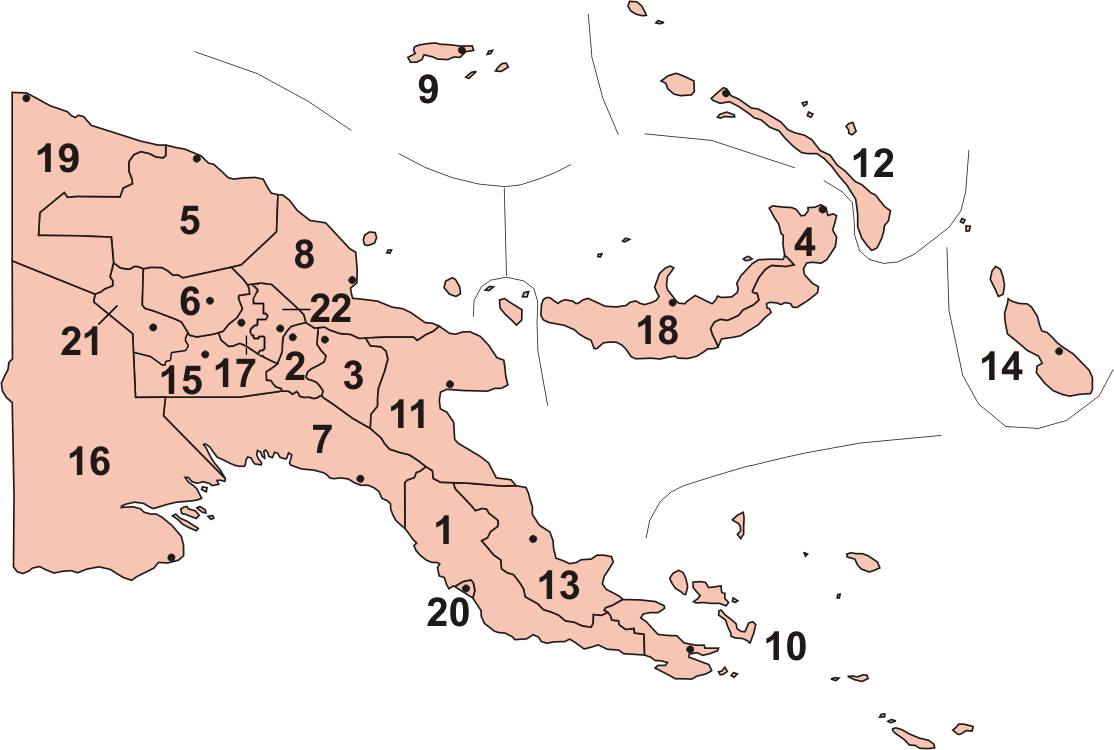
Provinces of Papua New Guinea

== Geography ==
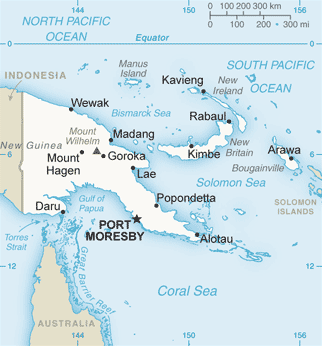
Map of Papua New Guinea

Papua New Guinea extends over 462,840 km^{2} (178,704 sq mi), including a large mainland and a number of islands. The country lies just south of the equator, and shares a land border with Indonesia, and maritime borders with Australia, the Solomon Islands, and the Federated States of Micronesia. The island of New Guinea lies at the east of the Malay Archipelago. The country is separated from Australia's Cape York Peninsula by the shallow 152-kilometre (94 mi) Torres Strait. To the west of this strait is the shallow Arafura Sea, while to its east is the much deeper Coral Sea. The Gulf of Papua covers much of the southern coast, while the Solomon Sea lies east of the mainland.

The total coastline is longer than 10,000 kilometres (6,200 mi), and the country has an exclusive economic zone of 2,396,575 km^{2} (925,323 mi^{2}). The country covers two time zones, with the Autonomous Region of Bougainville an hour ahead of the rest of the country.

The geological history of New Guinea is complex. It lies where the north-moving Indo-Australian plate meets the west-moving Pacific plate. This has caused its highly variable geography both on the mainland and on its islands. Tectonic movement is also the cause of the country's active volcanoes and frequent earthquakes. The country is situated on the Pacific Ring of Fire, with altogether 14 known active volcanoes and 22 dormant ones. The area south of the mountainous spine is part of the Australian craton, with much of the land to the north being accreted terrain. Both the mainland and the main island groups of the Bismarck Archipelago and the Bougainville are dominated by large mountains. Altogether, mountains cover at least 72% of the country. Of the rest, 15% are plains and 11% swamps. There are four larger islands (Bougainville, Manus, New Britain, and New Ireland) and over 600 smaller ones; the smaller islands also often have steep slopes and small coastal areas.

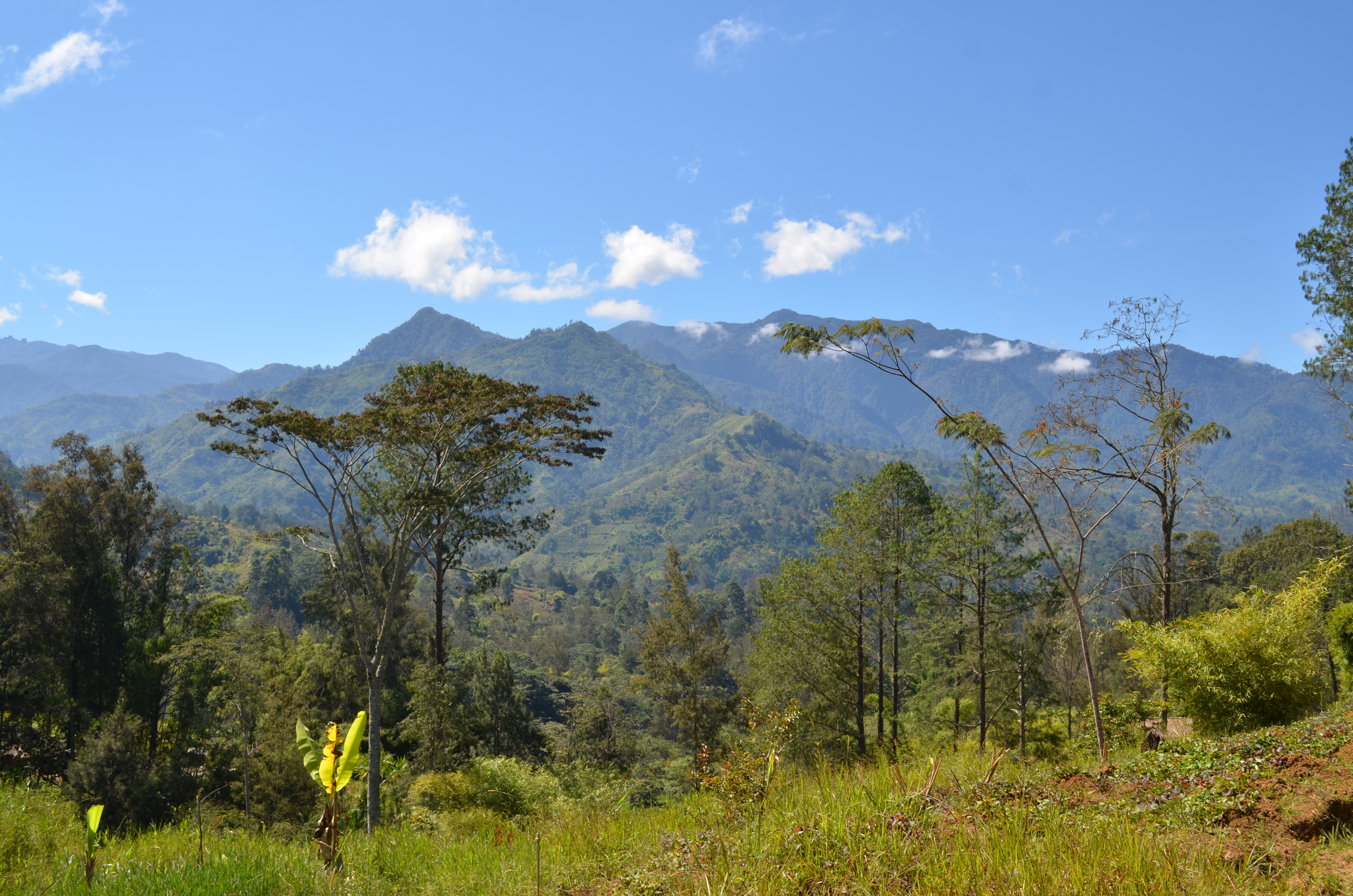
Papua New Guinea's highlands

The New Guinea Highlands lie within a spine of mountain ranges which run along the centre of the island from Milne Bay in the very southeast of Papua New Guinea through to the western end of Indonesian New Guinea. One of these mountains is Mount Wilhelm, which at 4,509 metres (14,793 ft) is the highest point in the country. Between these mountains are steep valleys, which have a variety of geological histories. The populous region referred to as the Highlands has shorter mountains than those to its northwest and southeast and includes some relatively flat areas between the mountains.

North of the central mountain belt, a large depression is drained by Sepik River in the west, and the Ramu and Markham Rivers flow through a graben in the east. The depression continues into the waters east of the mainland, forming the New Britain Trench. The northwest coast hosts the Bewani Mountains, Torricelli Range, and Prince Alexander Mountains, which the Sepik River separates from the Adelbert Range further east. East of this, the Huon Peninsula contains the Finisterre Range and the Saruwaged Range. Much of this northern coastline is made up of former seabed that has been raised, and the area remains tectonically active, prone to earthquakes and landslides. West of the Sepik river the northern coastline is highly exposed to the ocean, with no outlying islands, a lack of fringing reefs, and Sissano Lagoon the only sheltered bay. The Sepik river however is navigable for about half of its length.

The Sepik-Ramu river system extends across the north of the mainland, while the Fly River flows out the south. Both are surrounded by lowland plain and swamp areas. These form two of the nine drainage basins of the mainland. The other two major basins surround the Purari and Markham Rivers. Within this land lies over 5,000 lakes. Of these, only 22 exceed 1,000 hectares (2,500 acres), the largest being Lake Murray at 64,700 hectares (160,000 acres).

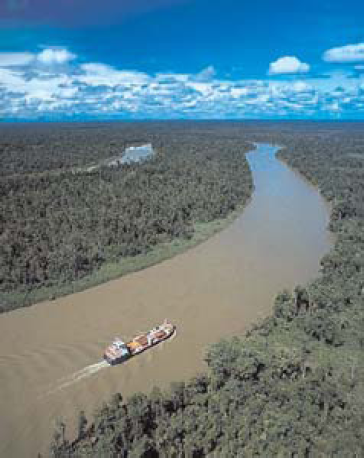
The Fly River flows through the country's largest contiguous lowland area.

The only geologically stable part of the country is its southwestern lowlands, which form the largest contiguous lowland area and has a number of floodplains and swamps. The volcanic Mount Bosavi lies in the north of these plains, and the coastal areas can be slightly hilly, especially towards the mouth of the Fly River. Forming a barrier between this area and the highland interior are the tall Southern Fold Mountains. Lake Kutubu lies within this mountain range. The Fly River, which originates in the central mountains, is navigable for the majority of its length.

The Papuan Peninsula (considered the island's "tail", and thus also known as the "Bird's Tail Peninsula") in the east contains Mount Lamington volcano and the Hydrographers Range on its northern side. Further east, the area around Cape Nelson has more volcanoes, including Mount Victory and Mount Trafalgar. In its centre runs the Owen Stanley Range, It has a number of sheltered bays, including Milne Bay, Goodenough Bay, Collingwood Bay, and the Huon Gulf. The small islands off the southeast, including the D'Entrecasteaux Islands, the Trobriand Islands, Woodlark Island, and the Louisiade Archipelago total just over 7,000 square kilometres (2,700 sq mi).

The major islands off the northeast of the mainland form along two arcs. One includes small islands near the mainland and the large island of New Britain. While New Britain is mostly not volcanic, volcanic activity along its north and especially in the Gazelle Peninsula around Rabaul has created fertile soil. The other island arc links Manus Island, New Hanover, New Ireland, and Bougainville. Bougainville hosts three large volcanoes. The area of these islands combined is around 68,000 square kilometres (26,000 sq mi).

The capital of Port Moresby lies on the southern coast. The city of Lae lies towards the east on the northern coast. Only around 2% of the country is regularly cultivated. The country is at risk of earthquakes, tsunamis, volcanic eruptions, floods, landslides, and droughts. Climate change is leading to rising sea levels. It is expected that populations will soon be forced to move from some areas of Bougainville, such as the Carteret Islands.

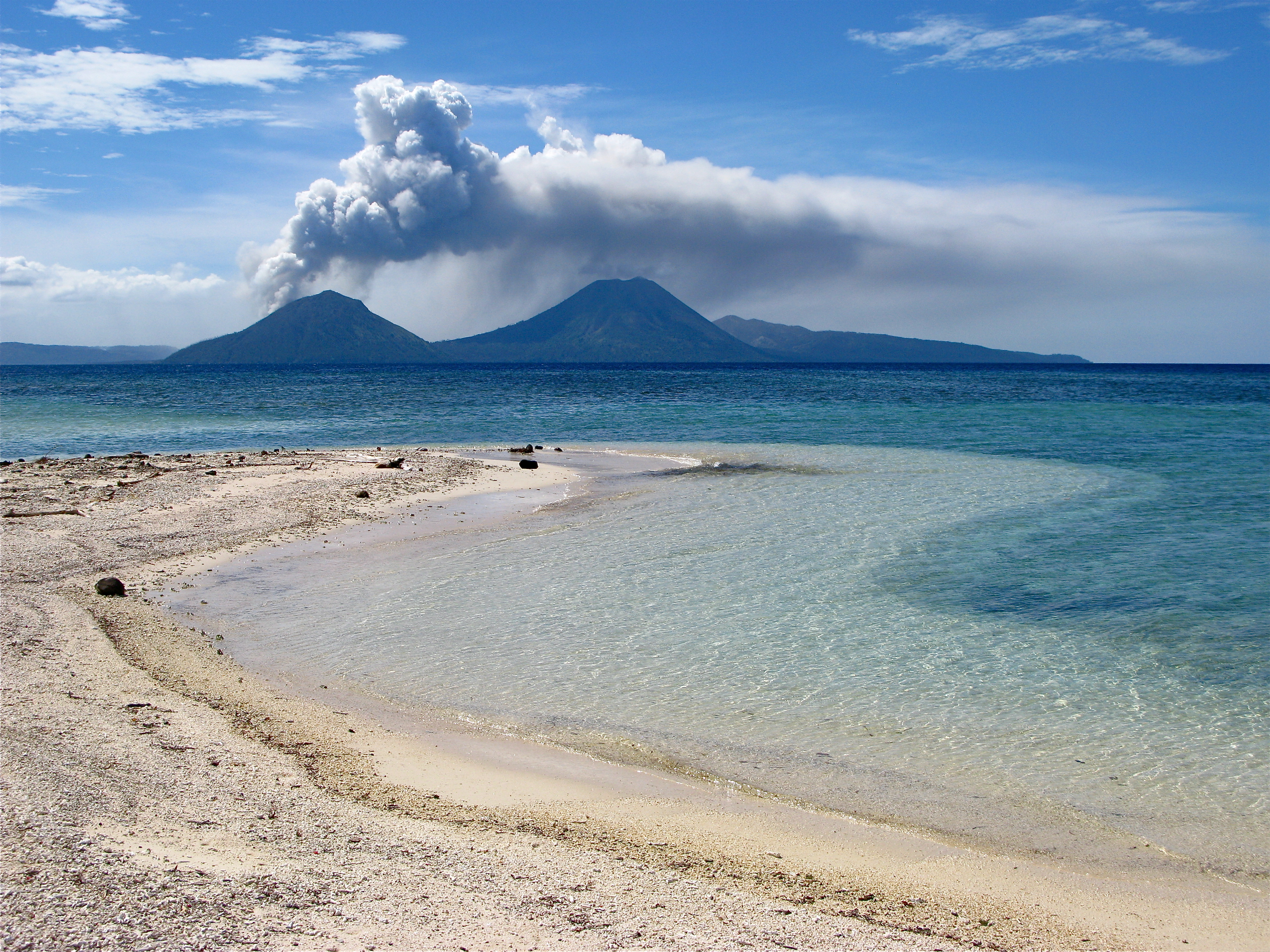
Tavurvur stratovolcano on New Britain in the Bismarck Archipelago

The country lies within the tropics, and more specifically within the Tropical Warm Pool, an area of ocean where sea surface temperatures and temperatures down to 200 metres (660 ft) remain mostly above 28 °C (82 °F) all year round. The overall climate is generally tropical, although it varies locally due to the highly variable geography. The average maximum temperature in coastal areas is around 32 °C (90 °F), while inland highlands average 26 °C (79 °F) and very mountainous areas 18 °C (64 °F). The average minimum temperature in coastal areas is 23 °C (73 °F). In the highlands above 2,100 metres (6,900 ft), night frosts are common, while the daytime temperature rarely exceeds 22 °C (72 °F), regardless of the season. Temperature roughly correlates with altitude.

The prevailing winds generally blow southeast from May to October, and northwest from December to March. This drives overall rain patterns, however the large mountains and rugged terrain create local weather conditions and wide variations in annual rainfall. The area around Port Moresby lies in a rain shadow and receives less than 1,000 millimetres (39 in) per year, while some highland areas receive over 8,000 millimetres (310 in). Lowland humidity averages around 80%, and cloud cover is very common. In some areas rain is highly seasonal, with a dry spell from May to November, while in other areas it is more regular. The period when the highest rainfall occurs differs by location. Various areas are affected by the Intertropical Convergence Zone, South Pacific convergence zone, the El Niño–Southern Oscillation, and monsoon seasons. Cyclones occasionally affect the country during the December to March wet season. The climate in the Papuan Peninsula is relatively mild compared to coastal areas more to the west.

=== Biodiversity ===
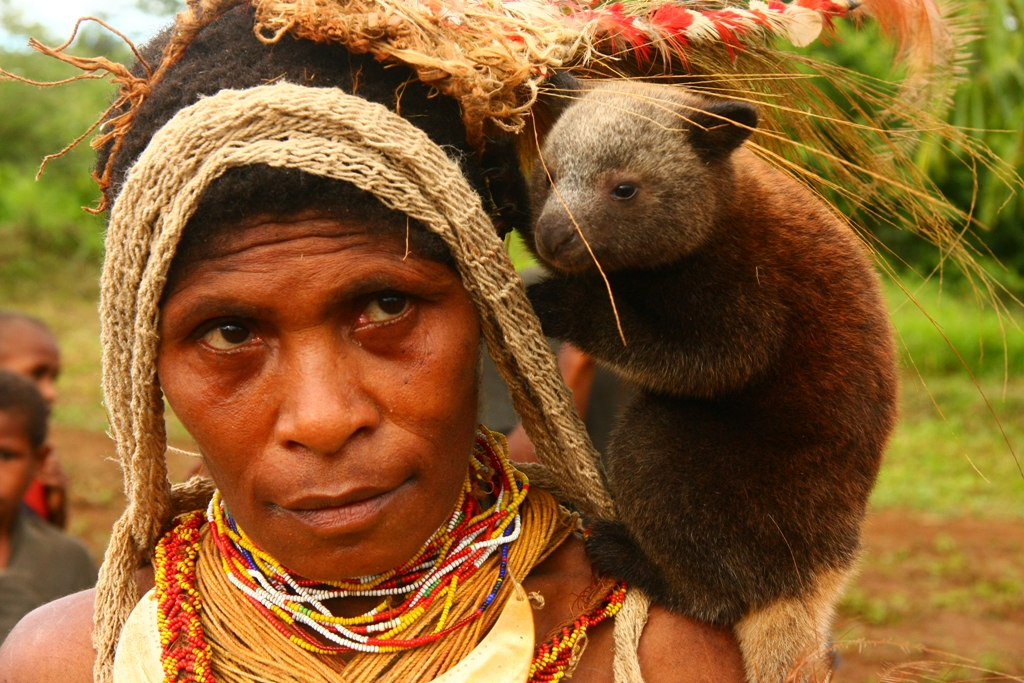
A tree-kangaroo in Papua New Guinea

Papua New Guinea is a megadiverse country, containing approximately 5% of known living species, of which perhaps one third are found nowhere else. It hosts 4.5% of known mammal diversity, and perhaps 30,000 vascular plant species. The forests of New Guinea form the third-largest contiguous rainforest area in the world. This large extent of forest contains rich biodiversity and contributes to the stability of the global climate. Vegetation can be broadly divided by altitude, into lowland, lower montane, upper montane, and alpine plant communities. These forests continue to provide food, natural resources, and other benefits derived from the environment to many communities. The complex geology and significant local variations in temperature, rainfall, and altitude mean the country has widely varying microclimates and numerous isolated habitats which host unique plant and animal communities. This local biodiversity can be sorted into broader classifications, such as those in coastal regions, mountainous areas, and different groups of islands.

A diverse variety of flora is found in the country, influenced by vegetation from Asia and Australia, and further varied by the country's rugged topography and distinct local climates. In areas heavily affected by human presence, Imperata and Themeda grasslands have formed. Cane grasses also grow in cleared areas, Miscanthus species in the highlands and Saccharum species in the lowlands. Such grasses often grow where land is left to fallow for 10 to 15 years. Around 4,800 square kilometres (1,900 sq mi) of mangroves stretch along the coast. The country is part of the Malesia biogeographical area, with its plant species more similar to those of East Asia than Australasia, although there are exceptions, especially at higher altitudes. The Bougainville archipelago is biogeographically most closely related to the rest of the Solomon Islands archipelago, distinct from the rest of the country.

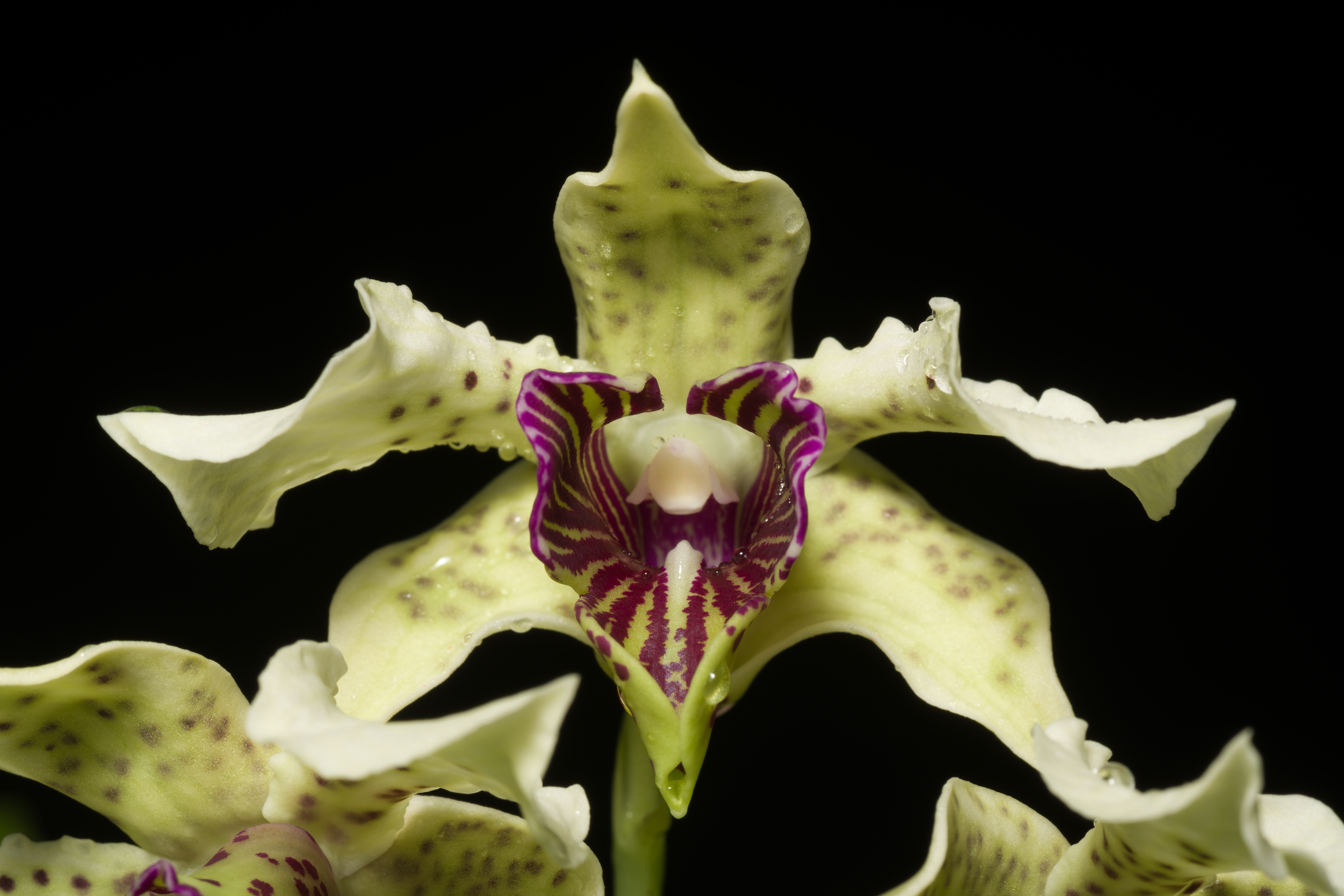
The Dendrobium atroviolaceum orchid is found only on some island groups within Milne Bay Province.

Within the rainforest, there are over 2,000 known species of orchids and around 2,000 species of ferns. The country is thought to have 150,000 species of insects, 813 birds, 314 freshwater fish, 352 amphibians, 335 reptiles, and 298 terrestrial mammals. It is believed that there are many undocumented species of plants and animals, with new species being regularly described. The western interior of the country is particularly poorly researched, although some groups such as birds-of-paradise and bowerbirds are likely well-known. Some areas have particularly large numbers of species of certain types of animals. Insect and lizard diversity is high north of the central mountain spine. Marsupial, snake, and freshwater fish diversity is highest in areas south of the mountain spine such as the Fly lowlands. Frog diversity is generally highest in mountainous areas on the mainland and Bougainville (an exception being the highly diverse Huon Peninsula).

Many animals are part of the same taxonomic groups as species on Australia. The large islands to the northeast have never been linked to New Guinea or another large landmass. As a consequence, they have their own flora and fauna; groups with many species on the mainland may have few or none on the islands, and well-known mainland groups such as birds-of-paradise, bowerbirds, and monotremes are completely absent from these islands. The islands have their own significant endemic animals, such as fruit bats and some frog groups. The reason different animal groups are present or absent on different groups of islands is not well understood. It is likely a product of geological history as well as dispersal. Islands lying between the mainland Huon Peninsula and New Britain provide an avenue for some migration. The small islands to the southeast were possibly linked to the mainland in the past and have similar wildlife. Papua New Guinea is surrounded by at least 13,840 square kilometres (5,340 sq mi) of coral reefs, although more may be unmapped. These reefs form part of the biodiverse Coral Triangle.

Nearly one-quarter of Papua New Guinea's rainforests were damaged or destroyed between 1972 and 2002, with around 15% being completely cleared. Up to a quarter of the forests are likely secondary forest, covering areas cultivated in the past. In these areas, cultivation cycles may include a fallow period of as long as 50 years. Clearing has turned a very small amount of forest area into savanna.

== Economy ==
Port Moresby's central business district

Papua New Guinea is classified as a developing economy by the International Monetary Fund. The economy is largely dependent on natural resources, with capital investment concentrated in mining and oil, while most labour is employed in agriculture. As of 2018, natural resource extraction made up 28% of overall GDP, with substantial contributors including minerals, oil, and natural gas. Measuring economic growth is difficult due to the resource-dependent economy distorting GDP. Other metrics such as gross national income are hard to measure. Even historical GDP estimates have changed dramatically. As of 2019, PNG's real GDP growth rate was 3.8%, with an inflation rate of 4.3%. The national currency, the Kina, is regulated by the Bank of Papua New Guinea, which has varied its approach to managing the exchange rate. Formal employment is low. There is a minimum wage, but it has declined in real terms since independence. In the late 2010s, around 40% of those employed in urban areas worked outside of agriculture, but only around 20% in rural areas.

Timber and marine resources are also exported, with the country being one of the few suppliers of tropical timber, Forestry is an important economic resource for Papua New Guinea, but the industry uses low and semi-intensive technological inputs. As a result, product ranges are limited to sawed timber, veneer, plywood, block board, moulding, poles and posts and wood chips. Only a few finished products are exported. Lack of automated machinery, coupled with inadequately trained local technical personnel, are some of the obstacles to introducing automated machinery and design. Forestry is an avenue for corruption and many projects face legal uncertainty. Up to 70% of logging may be illegal. Marine fisheries provide around 10% of global tuna catch.

Agriculture in the country includes crops grown for domestic sale and international export, as well as for subsistence agriculture. Agricultural exports of commodities such as copra, copra oil, rubber, tea, cocoa, and coffee have not grown. However, the conversion of forests to oil palm plantations to produce palm oil has become a significant and growing source of employment and income. Overall the country produces 1.6% of global palm oil, and 1% of global coffee. While not the largest sector of the economy, agriculture provides the most employment, at around 85% of all jobs.

Assessments of poverty have found that it is most common in rural areas. Nearly 40% of the population are subsistence farmers, living relatively independently of the cash economy. As a result, farming is the most widespread economic activity. Most is carried out through simple rainfed surface irrigation, with specific techniques varying by location. Taro is a historical crop, although the introduction of the now-staple sweet potato allowed for cultivation as high as 2,700 metres (8,900 ft). Metroxylon sagu, from which sago is extracted, is also commonly cultivated.

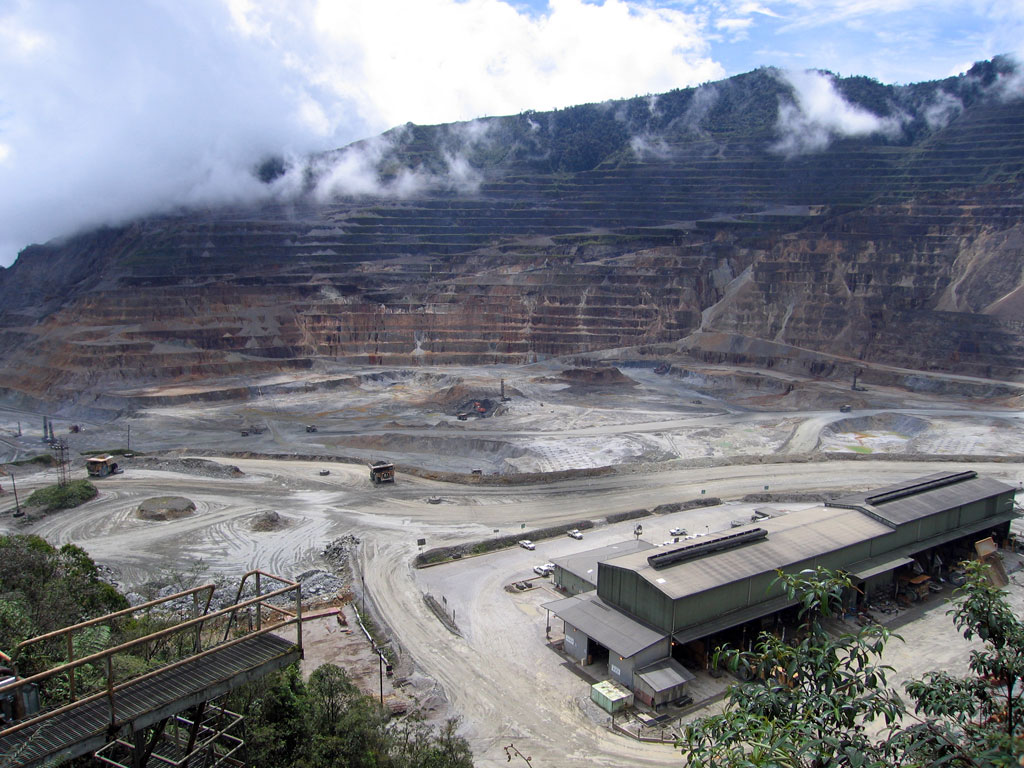
The Ok Tedi Mine in southwestern Papua New Guinea

Significant exported minerals include gold, copper, cobalt, and nickel. Oil and liquefied natural gas (LNG) are also major export commodities. Extractive resources make up 86% of all exports, and their high value has enabled the country to generally run current account surpluses. The biggest mine is a private gold mine on Lihir Island, which is followed by the state-run Ok Tedi Mine, and then the Porgera Gold Mine. LNG exports began in 2014, although the opening of new projects has been delayed due to disputes regarding revenue sharing.

The country's terrain has made it difficult for the country to develop transportation infrastructure, resulting in air travel being the most efficient and reliable means of transportation. There are five highways, although only two go into the interior. Domestic shipping is limited. There are 22 international ports, although not all are operational. The biggest is Lae Port, which handles about half of all international cargo. Papua New Guinea has over 500 airstrips, most of which are unpaved. Many roads are poorly maintained, and some cannot be used during the wet season. Nonetheless, the majority of the population lives within 5 kilometres (3.1 mi) of a national road, and even more live near district or rural roads.

The Sirinumu Dam and Yonki Dam provide some hydropower. There is limited sewage treatment, even in the capital. Some is discharged directly into the ocean, leading to issues with pollution. Renewable energy sources represent two-thirds of the total electricity supply.

Overall housing quality is low, with 15% of houses having a finished floor in the late 2010s. In urban areas, 55% of houses were connected to electricity in 2016. Rural areas saw only 10% connection, although this is a significant increase from 3% in 1996. Over half of urban houses had access to piped water, while only 15% of rural houses did, although rural houses had more access to wells. The average number of people per room was 2.5.

Over 97% of the country is designated as customary land, held by communities. Many such effective titles remain unregistered and effectively informal. Land registration efforts have had very limited success. The PNG legislature has enacted laws in which a type of tenure called "customary land title" is recognised, meaning that the traditional lands of the indigenous peoples have some legal basis for inalienable tenure. This customary land notionally covers most of the usable land in the country (some 97% of total land area); alienated land is either held privately under state lease or is government land. Freehold title (also known as fee simple) can only be held by Papua New Guinean citizens.

== Demographics ==
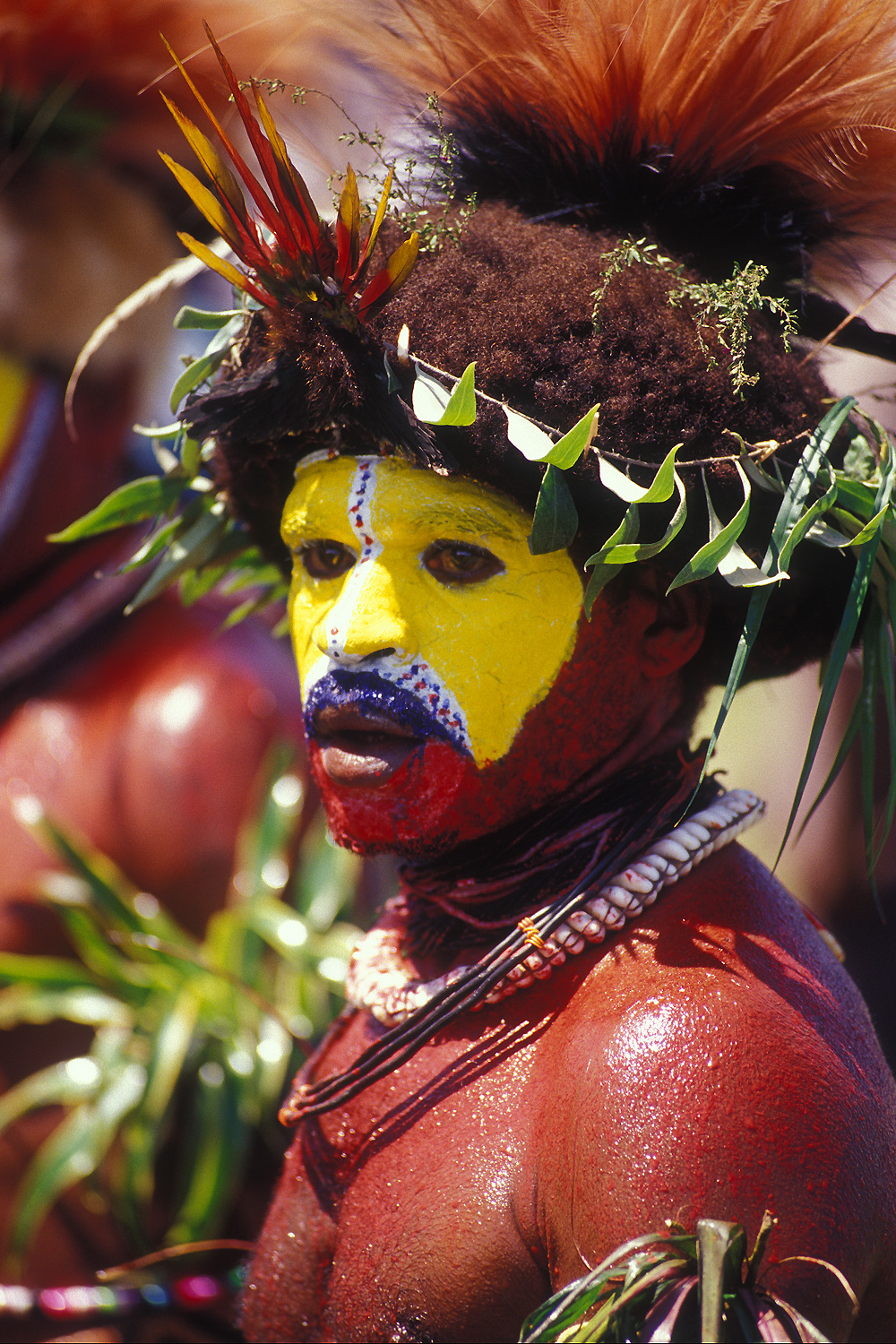
Huli wigman from the Southern Highlands Province

Papua New Guinea is one of the most heterogeneous nations in the world. In addition to having perhaps a quarter of the world's languages, ethnic identity within the country is further divided by factors such as geography, kinship ties, and external pressures. The United Nations Department of Economic and Social Affairs population estimate as of 2020 was 8.95 million inhabitants. Government estimates put the population at 11.8 million in 2021. With the National Census deferred during 2020/2021, ostensibly on the grounds of the COVID-19 pandemic, an interim assessment was conducted using satellite imagery. In December 2022, a report by the UN, based upon a survey conducted with the University of Southampton using satellite imagery and ground-truthing, suggested a new population estimate of 17 million, nearly double the country's official estimate. In July 2023 the UN officially revised its estimate to 11.8 million. While decadal censuses have been carried out since 1961, the reliability of past censuses is unsure. Nonetheless, the population is thought to have grown greatly since independence. Despite this growth, urbanisation has remained largely unchanged or only slightly increased. As of 2015, about 0.3% of the population was international migrants.

Papua New Guinea is one of the most rural countries, with only 14% of its population living in urban centres as of 2023. The biggest city is the capital Port Moresby, with other larger settlements including Lae, Mount Hagen, Madang, and Wewak. As of 2000, there were 40 urban areas with a population over 1,000. Most of its people live in customary communities. The most populated region is the Highlands, with 43% of the population. The northern mainland has 25%, the southern region 18%, and the Islands Region 14%. Traditional small communities, usually under 300 people, often consist of a very small main village, surrounded by farms and gardens in which other dwellings are dispersed. These are lived in for some of the year, and villagers may have multiple homes. In communities which need to hunt or farm across wide areas, the main village may be as small as one or two buildings. Up to two-thirds of the country might be classed as unoccupied. Outside of urban areas, the highest population densities are on small islands. An increase in urban populations has led to an average decrease in urban quality of life, even as the quality of life in rural areas has generally improved. Despite the widespread population, over four-fifths live within eight hours of a government service centre.

The gender ratio in 2016 was 51% male and 49% female. The number of households headed by a male was 82.5%, or 17.5% were headed by females. The median age of marriage is 20, while 18% of women are in polygynous relationships. The population is young, with a median age under 22 in 2011, when 36% of the population was younger than 15. The dependency ratio in urban areas was 64% in the late 2010s, while it was 83% in rural areas. As of 2016, the total fertility rate was 4.4.

Health infrastructure overall is poorly developed. There is a high incidence of HIV/AIDS, and there have been outbreaks of diseases such as cholera and tuberculosis. Vaccine coverage in 2016 was 35%, with 24% of children having no vaccines. As of 2019, life expectancy in Papua New Guinea at birth was 63 years for men and 67 for women. Government health expenditure in 2014 accounted for 9.5% of total government spending, with total health expenditure equating to 4.3% of GDP. There were 0.61 doctors per 10,000 people in 2023. The 2008 maternal mortality rate per 100,000 births for Papua New Guinea was 250. This is compared with 270 in 2005 and 340 in 1990. The under-5 mortality rate, per 1,000 births is 69 and the neonatal mortality as a percentage of under-5s' mortality is 37. The number of midwives per 1,000 live births is 1, and the lifetime risk of death for pregnant women is 1 in 94. These national improvements in child mortality mostly reflect improvement in rural areas, with little change or slight worsening in some urban areas.

In the late 2010s, the proportion of men without education was around 32%, while for the female population it was 40%. The literacy rate was 63.4% in 2015. Much of the education in PNG is provided by church institutions. Tuition fees were abolished in 2012, leading to an increase in educational attendance, but results were mixed and the fees were partially reintroduced in 2019. Papua New Guinea has four public universities and two private ones, as well as seven other tertiary institutions.

=== Languages ===
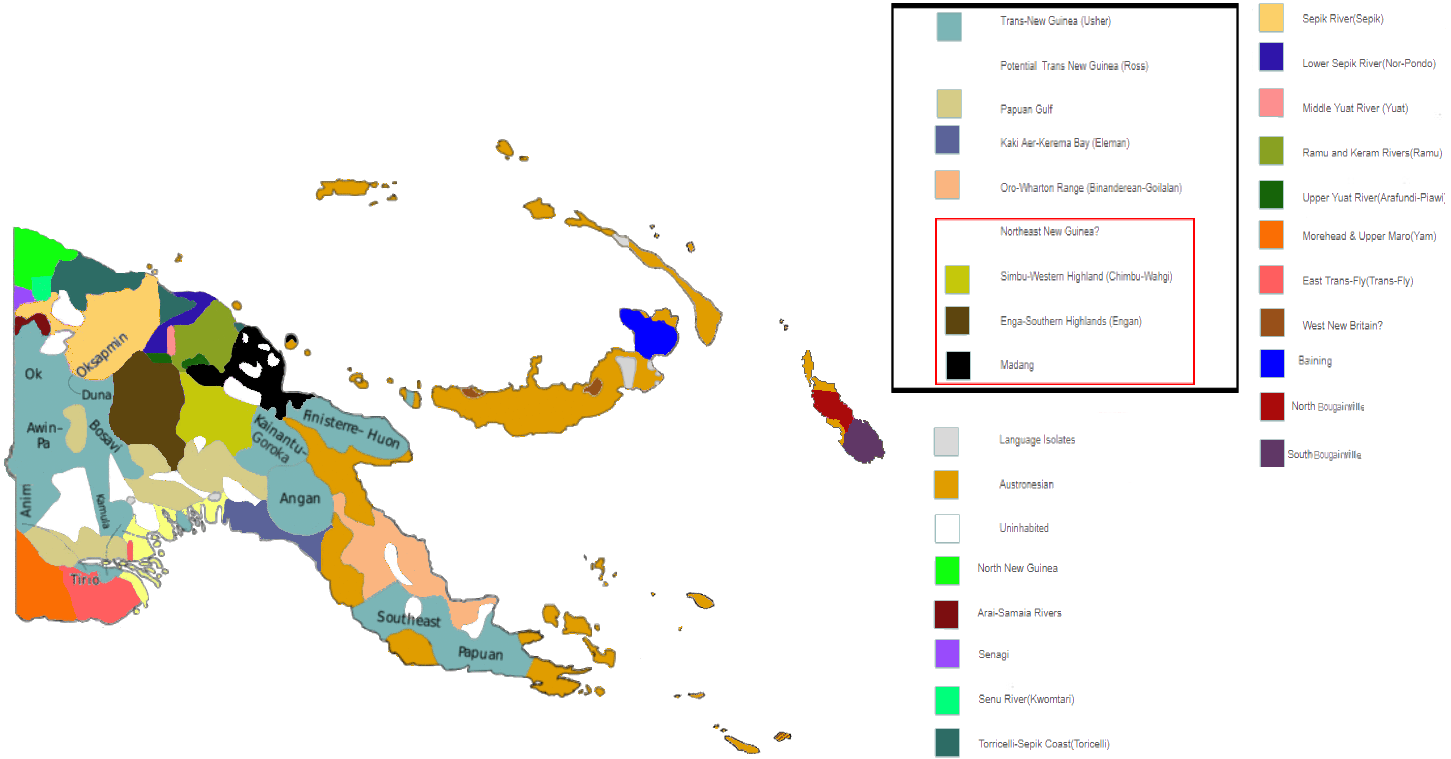
The language families of Papua New Guinea, according to Timothy Usher

The language families in Ross's conception of the Trans-New Guinea language family. The affiliation of some Eastern branches is not universally accepted.

There are around 840 known languages of Papua New Guinea (including English), making it the most linguistically diverse country in the world. Papua New Guinea has more languages than any other country, with over 820 indigenous languages, representing 12% of the world's total, but the majority are spoken by fewer than a thousand people, and an average of only 7,000 speakers per language. Papua New Guinea has the second highest density of languages among all nations on Earth, after Vanuatu. The most widely spoken indigenous language is Enga, with about 200,000 speakers, followed by Melpa and Huli. However, even Enga is divided into different dialects. Indigenous languages are classified into two large groups, Austronesian languages and Papuan, although "Papuan" is a group of convenience for local non-Austronesian languages, rather than defining any linguistic relationships.

There are four languages in Papua New Guinea with popular cultural recognition as national languages: English, Tok Pisin, Hiri Motu, and, since 2015, sign language (in practice Papua New Guinean Sign Language). However, there is no specific legislation proclaiming official languages. Language is only briefly mentioned in the constitution, which calls for "universal literacy in Pisin, Hiri Motu or English" as well as "tok ples" and "ita eda tano gado" (the terms for local languages in Tok Pisin and Hiri Motu respectively). It also mentions the ability to speak a local language as a requirement for citizenship by nationalisation, and that those arrested are required to be informed in a language they understand.

English is the language of commerce and the education system, while the primary lingua franca of the country is Tok Pisin. Parliamentary debates are usually conducted in a mixture of English and Tok Pisin. The national judiciary uses English, while provincial and district courts usually use Tok Pisin or Hiri Motu. Village courts may use a local language. Most national newspapers use English, although one national weekly newspaper, Wantok, uses Tok Pisin. National radio and television use English and Tok Pisin, with a small amount of Hiri Motu. Provincial radio uses a mixture of these languages, in addition to local ones. Over time, Tok Pisin has continued to spread as the most common language, displacing Hiri Motu, including in the former Hiri Motu-dominated capital, Port Moresby.

Most provinces do not have a dominant local language, although exceptions exist. Enga Province is dominated by Enga language speakers, but it adopted Tok Pisin as its official language in 1976. East New Britain Province is dominated by Tolai speakers, which has caused issues with minority speakers of the Baining languages or Sulka. However, language has generally not been a cause for conflict, with conflicts occurring between communities speaking the same language, and regional identities incorporating many linguistic communities. English and Tok Pisin are generally seen as neutral languages, while local languages are considered culturally valuable and multilingualism is officially encouraged.

The use of almost all local languages, as well as Hiri Motu, is declining, with some local languages having under 100 speakers remaining. The use of local languages has been encouraged by government, which after independence created a policy of teaching early literacy and numeracy in local languages. As of April 2000, 837 languages had educational support, with few problems reported from schools covering two local language communities. However, in 2013, education was shifted back towards English in an attempt to improve low English literacy rates.

=== Religion ===
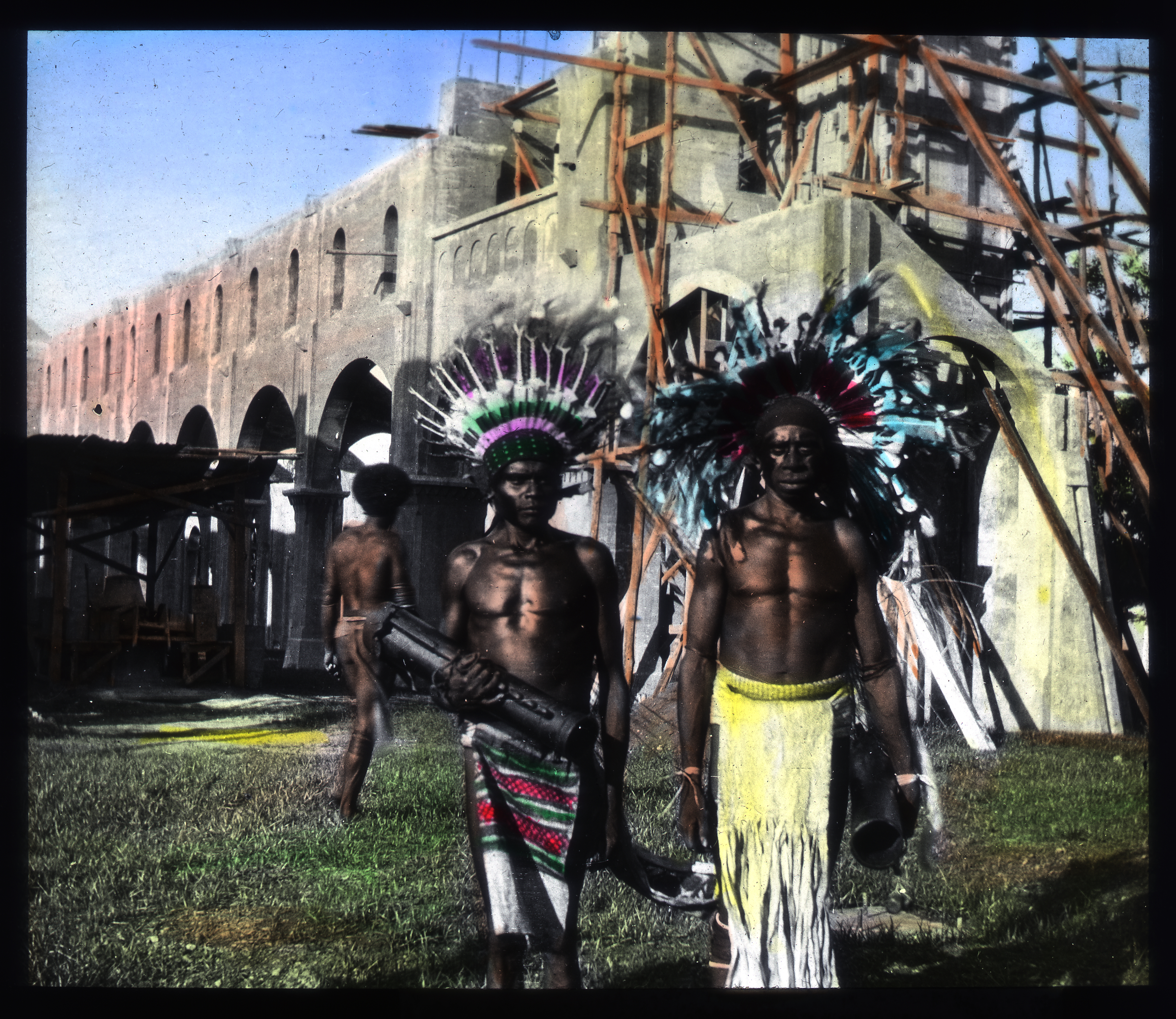
Ss Peter and Paul Cathedral in Dogura was once the largest building in the country.

The 2011 census found that 95.6% of citizens identified themselves as Christian, 1.4% reported other beliefs, and 3.1% gave no answer. Virtually no respondent identified as being non-religious. Religious syncretism is common, with many citizens combining their Christian faith with some traditional indigenous religious practices. Many Christian denominations have a large presence in the country. The largest denomination is the Catholic Church, followed by 26.0% of the population. The next largest is the Evangelical Lutheran Church of Papua New Guinea (18.4%), followed by the Seventh-day Adventist Church (12.9%), Pentecostal denominations (10.4%), the United Church in Papua New Guinea and Solomon Islands (10.3%), "Other Christian" (9.7%), Evangelical Alliance (5.9%), the Anglican Church of Papua New Guinea (3.2%), the Baptist Union of Papua New Guinea (2.8%) and smaller groups.

The government and judiciary have upheld the constitutional right to freedom of speech, thought, and belief. However, Christian fundamentalism and Christian Zionism have become more common, driven by the spread of American prosperity theology through visitors and televangelism. This has challenged the dominance of mainstream churches and reduced the expression of some aspects of pre-Christian culture. A constitutional amendment in March 2025 recognised Papua New Guinea as a Christian country, with specific mention of "God, the Father; Jesus Christ, the Son; and Holy Spirit", and the Bible as a national symbol.

== Culture ==
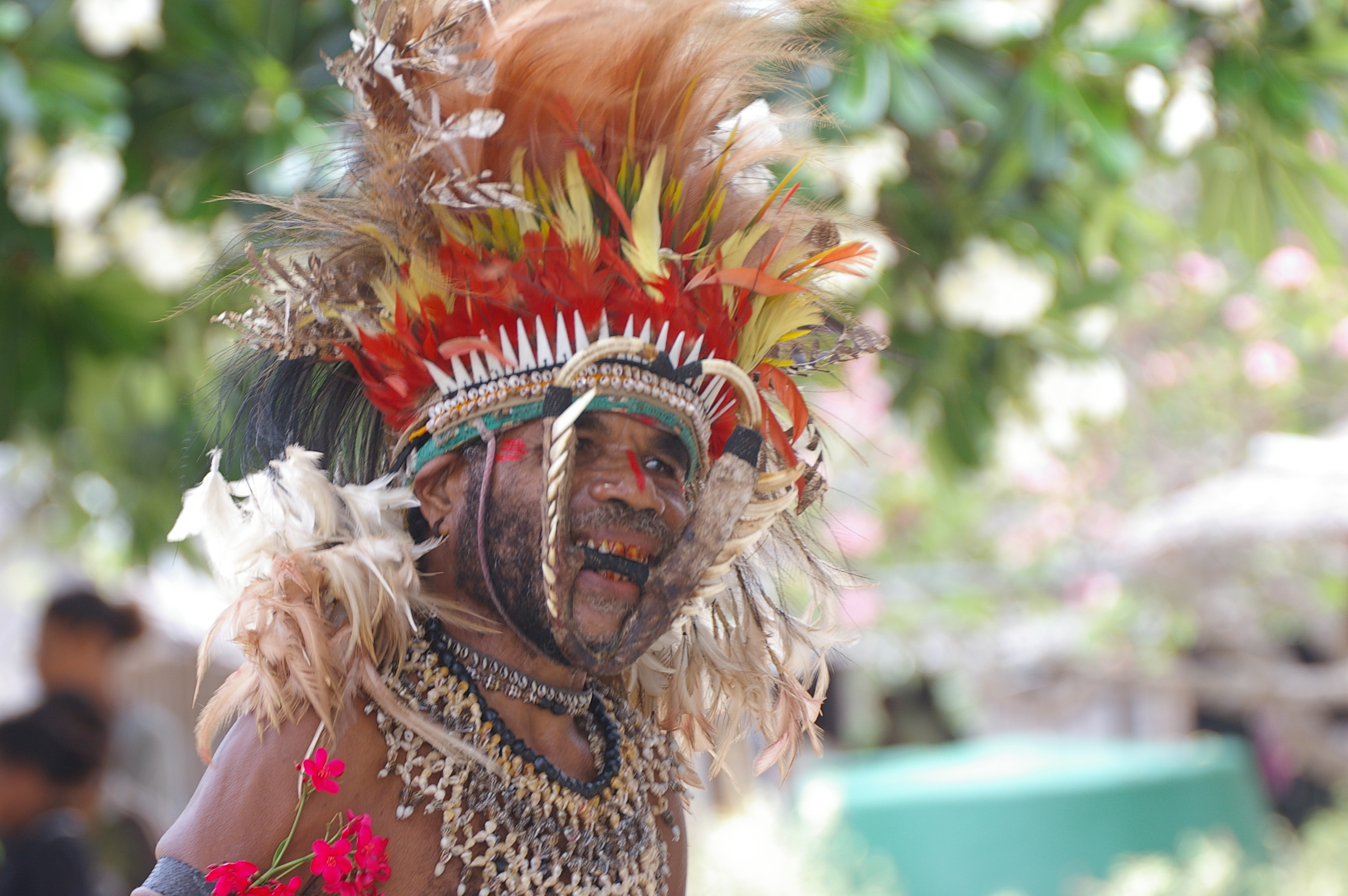
A resident of Boga-Boga, a village on the southeast coast of mainland Papua New Guinea

Melanesian culture developed without significant external influence due to the isolation of New Guinea. This culture places significant importance on relationships, both between people and between a person and aspects of the natural environment. The importance of relationships is seen in the Kula ring trade, where items are traded to maintain relationships rather than for direct economic benefit. Connections to and ownership of land are important, although these are generally at the community level rather than an individual one. Local in-group relations are a strong component of the wantok system, and so treatment by individuals of those in their communities will often differ from the way they treat those of other communities. The value of actions is often evaluated predominantly or exclusively by impact on one's local community.

The culture of traditional Melanesian societies sees small communities led under a "big man". These are often considered to be positions earned through merit and societies are thought to be relatively egalitarian, although at times hereditary influence does play a role, and there are varying social stratifications in addition to differences relating to age and gender. Broadly, highland societies were likely more individualistic than lowland societies. As in the traditional big man system the position is expected to be demonstrated in part through the generous dispersion of excess wealth, cultural expectations lead to the use of modern political and economic positions for patronage. The dominance of this system constrains modern gender roles, with the vast majority of politicians and leaders continuing to be men. The difference between men and women is the largest source of inequality in traditional communities. Those who become "big men" may maintain some respect throughout life, although status can be lost if others can outperform them. Kinship may come from expressed ties as well as biological ones. The importance of traditional communities can also clash with the concept of higher levels of authority.

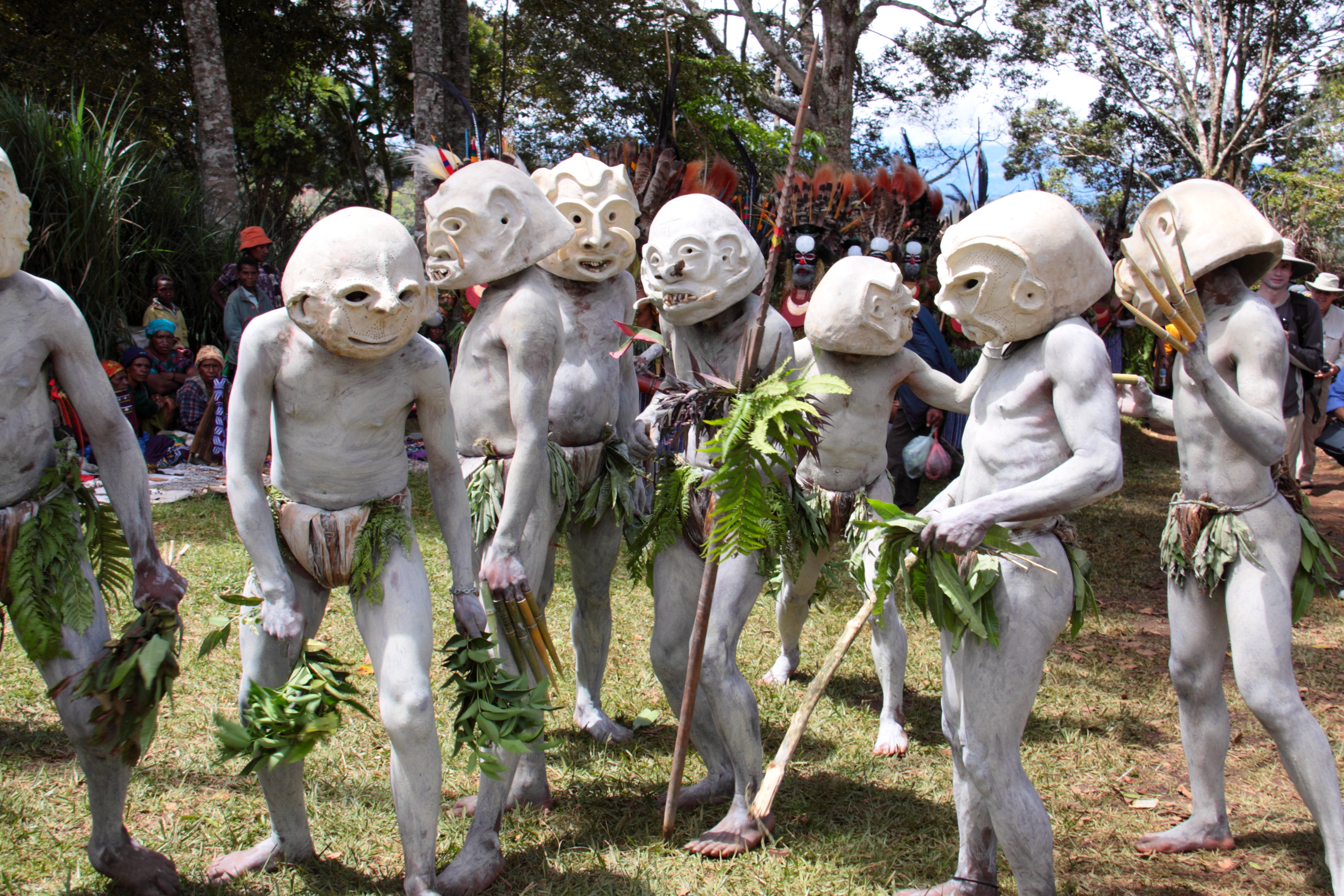
Asaro Mudmen

The country remains greatly fragmented, with strong local identities and allegiances that often contrast with a weak national identity. One joint symbol of national identity is the bird-of-paradise, which is present on the national flag and emblem. Feathers from these birds remain important in traditional ceremonies, and during sing-sing gatherings. The country possesses one UNESCO World Heritage Site, the Kuk Early Agricultural Site, which was inscribed in 2008. Seashells were historically valuable. In highland areas far from the coast, they were considered of greater worth than steel at the time of the first European contact. Shells retain ceremonial value, and in parts of East New Britain Province shells still retain some function as a form of currency. The name for the national currency, "kina", comes from a kind of gold-lipped pearl shell.

Music varies between linguistic communities, although there are regional similarities. Music is a common method of passing on cultural knowledge, and plays an important role in rituals and customs. Widespread traditional musical instruments include the garamut (a kind of slit drum), the kundu (a single-headed drum), bamboo flutes, and the susap (a mouth-operated lamellophone). Other local instruments have more restricted usage, while introduced instruments such as guitars and ukuleles became widespread after the Second World War. Modern music has been heavily influenced by Christian music, which has developed within multiple languages. The regional bamboo band style spread in the 1970s, and local musical recording has been undertaken since before independence. The first music video was shown on television in 1990. One early band, Sanguma, formed in 1977 at the National Arts School and toured internationally. Traditional musical performances are also known internationally, with well known examples including those of the Asaro Mudmen and the Huli people.

Sport is an important part of Papua New Guinean culture, providing an outlet for intergroup conflict while also helping maintain a source of national unity. Rugby league is extremely popular, serving as a unifying national sport. Support is passionate enough that people have died in violent clashes while supporting their team.

A distinct body of Papua New Guinean literature emerged in the leadup to independence, with the first major publication being Ten Thousand Years in a Lifetime, an autobiography by Albert Maori Kiki published in 1968. The government began to actively support literature in 1970, publishing works in multiple languages. Much of this early work was nationalistic and anti-colonial. 1970 saw the beginning of some local newspapers, as well as the publication of the first Papua New Guinean novel: Crocodile by Vincent Eri.

Of national newspapers, there are two national English language dailies, two English language weeklies, and one weekly Tok Pisin newspaper. There are some local television services, as well as both government-run and private radio stations. There are three mobile carriers, although Digicel has a 92% market share due to its more extensive coverage of rural areas. Around two-thirds of the population is thought to have some mobile access, if intermittent.

== See also ==
- Outline of Papua New Guinea
