= HIV/AIDS in Papua New Guinea =

Epidemic in Papua New Guinea

With 1.28 percent of the adult population estimated by UNAIDS to be HIV-positive in 2006, Papua New Guinea has one of the most serious HIV/AIDS epidemics in the Asia-Pacific subregion. Although this new prevalence rate is significantly lower than the 2005 UNAIDS estimate of 1.8 percent, it is considered to reflect improvements in surveillance rather than a shrinking epidemic. Papua New Guinea accounts for 70 percent of the subregion's HIV cases and is the fourth country after Thailand, Cambodia, and Burma to be classified as having a generalized HIV epidemic.

== History ==
Papua New Guinea's first case of HIV was reported in 1987. In the 1990s HIV prevalence rose steeply. In the years after 2002, approximately 2,000 new infections were reported annually, leading to a belief that there was an increasing trend in the projected number of new infections, particularly in rural areas. The National AIDS Council (NAC) and National Department of Health of Papua New Guinea estimated that 46,275 people were HIV-positive by the end of 2006.

2015 WHO data suggested that the HIV epidemic has been "stabilizing and declining". An estimated 32,000 people were living with HIV as of 2013. The 2013 adult HIV prevalence was 0.7 per 100. The number of people on antiretroviral therapy between 2007 and 2013 increased five-fold from 2,250 to 14,781 respectively.

== Transmission ==
The mode of transmission of HIV/AIDS in Papua New Guinea is predominantly heterosexual activity, with most cases occurring among people aged 20 to 40, according to a 2006 report by the National AIDS Council Secretariat and National Department of Health. The ratio of HIV-infected women to men is about one to one. Those most at risk include sex workers, their clients, and the partners of clients. In 2006, HIV prevalence of 14 percent was found among female sex workers in Port Moresby, according to UNAIDS.

Transactional sex is common, particularly in rural and peri-urban areas. A 2006 study found that 55 percent of women interviewed had exchanged sex for money, goods, or both, and 36 percent of men had paid for sex. According to the Papua New Guinea Institute of National Affairs, the spread of HIV/AIDS has typically occurred in areas surrounding mining and logging sites as well as along transportation routes. Children under age 18 are particularly vulnerable to HIV/AIDS. UNICEF reports that 10,946 children were HIV-positive, and 9,400 were orphaned by AIDS as of 2005.

A number of factors contribute to Papua New Guinea's growing HIV epidemic. Papua New Guinea shares an island with Papua, Indonesia, which has the highest HIV prevalence in Indonesia (4 percent) and has close to a third of all Indonesia's HIV cases. The proximity of Papua New Guinea to a high-prevalence neighboring region is cause for concern. Condom use is low, with only 24 percent of young men and 13 percent of young women in Port Moresby using condoms, according to UNAIDS. Other factors include a high proportion of the population that is of reproductive age and an average age at sexual debut of 15 for both sexes. Risky sexual activities, such as multiple partner relationships, high rates of transactional sex, and sexual violence against women, are common.

Knowledge about HIV transmission and prevention is low. High levels of urban migration have broken down traditional methods of social control. The national response to HIV/AIDS is also challenged by the large number of cultural and linguistic groups, geographical difficulties, and socioeconomic conditions associated with poverty and unemployment. Given the current situation, there is a need to address gender aspects, including male roles and the feminization of the epidemic. Stigma and discrimination are ongoing problems, resulting in families neglecting people living with HIV/AIDS (PLWHA).

Papua New Guinea has a high tuberculosis (TB) burden, with 111 new cases per 100,000 people in 2005, according to the World Health Organization. 9.7 percent of adults with TB were co-infected with HIV in 2005. High rates of HIVTB co-infections increase the difficulty of treating both diseases.

== National response ==
Papua New Guinea's national AIDS response has been overseen and coordinated by the National AIDS Council (NAC) since 1997. The council is a multisectoral committee, comprising representatives of government departments, councils of churches, the National Council of Women, the Chamber of Commerce, nongovernmental organizations, and PLWHA. The council's secretariat provides support, running day-to-day operations.

The National Strategic Plan for 2004–2008 focuses on seven priority areas of intervention: treatment, counseling, care, and support; education and prevention; epidemiology and surveillance; social and behavioral change research; leadership, partnership, and coordination; family and community; and monitoring and evaluation. The Plan stresses the importance of expanding access to voluntary counseling and testing services, especially at the district and provincial levels; ensuring the clinical management of opportunistic infections such as TB; and providing antiretroviral therapy (ART) to PLWHA. In 2006, the National AIDS Council finalized the Gender Policy on HIV/AIDS and its implementation plan and a Workplace Policy Tool Kit on HIV/AIDS, currently implemented by private and public sector entities.

In 2004, the Government of Papua New Guinea introduced prevention of mother-to-child transmission of HIV projects at six hospitals; however, according to UNAIDS, fewer than 3 percent of HIV-positive pregnant women were receiving ART in 2005.

The Global Fund to Fight AIDS, Tuberculosis and Malaria approved Papua New Guinea for a fourth-round grant in 2005 to scale up HIV/AIDS prevention, care, and treatment through an intensified multisectoral community-based program.

== National AIDS Council of Papua New Guinea ==
The NAC, led by its secretariat, is responsible for the formulation of policy for the prevention, control and management of HIV and AIDS. The secretariat comprises twenty five members, including eight Program Advisers and sixteen technical and support staff at national level.

The secretariat is chaired by Sir Peter Barter, OBE, and its president is Mr Wep Kanawi CSM, OBE.

=== Performance ===
The NAC has been subject to a number of controversies since its inception, all relating to corruption.

In February 2008, the NAC came under scrutiny when it was alleged that six senior officials, including acting director Romanus Pakure had misappropriated hundreds of thousands of dollars intended for the country's fight against AIDS. The misappropriation involved falsification of purchase orders, including a stationery order of US$361,000 that never arrived, and officials using money to go on overseas trips.

Pakure, along with the other five senior executives, was suspended pending an investigation into the matter. At the time, Pakure said he welcomed the investigation but questioned the legality of the suspension because he learnt about it in the media before receiving a letter from the Department of Health.

In March 2009, further allegations of misappropriation of funding emerged. At the time, Chairman Sir Peter Barter said that these matters were being investigated internally and he had written to the ministry of finance and other bodies for assistance.

These issues of corruption have become a notable hindrance to the country's fight against HIV/AIDS. It was reported in the media in March 2009 that corruption, misappropriation and mismanagement were responsible for two million condoms being left in a warehouse in Port Moresby until well after their expiry dates.

The NAC subsequently underwent a restructuring exercise in order to rid the council of corruption and poor management, which involved the sacking of several employees. In 2011, Wep Kanawi and an Australian adviser to the NAC were, separately, physically attacked as a result of their involvement in the fight against corruption.
