= List of political parties in Papua New Guinea =

This article lists political parties in Papua New Guinea. Papua New Guinea has a multi-party system with numerous political parties, in which no one party often has a chance of gaining power alone, and parties must work with each other to form coalition governments.

Political parties in Papua New Guinea are generally based on the personality of their leaders rather than on any concrete ideology, which has made party politics in the country dynamic and unpredictable. This has led to criticism of the Papua New Guinean party system, both in the country itself and overseas.

== Currently registered parties ==
=== Represented in parliament ===
Party	Abbr.	Leader	Ideology	MPs
Pangu Pati	—N/a	James Marape	Indigenism; Developmentalism; Economic nationalism	58 / 118
People's National Congress	PNC	Joseph Lelang	Populism	14 / 118
United Resources Party	URP	William Duma	Resource nationalism	12 / 118
National Alliance Party	NAP	Patrick Pruaitch		4 / 118
People's Party	—N/a	Peter Ipatas		4 / 118
Social Democratic Party	SDP	Powes Parkop	Social democracy	4 / 118
People's First Party	PFP	Richard Maru		4 / 118
Papua New Guinea Party	PNG Party	Belden Namah		3 / 118
United Labour Party	ULP	Vacant	Labour rights	3 / 118
Advance PNG Party	—N/a	Muglua Dilu		2 / 118
National Party	—N/a	Kerenga Kua		3 / 118
Liberal Party	—N/a	John Thomas Pundari		2 / 118
Allegiance Party	AP	Bryan Kramer	Anti-corruption	1 / 118
Papua New Guinea Greens	PNG Greens	Wan Wak	Green politics; Environmentalism; Participatory democracy	1 / 118
Melanesian Alliance Party	MAP	Joseph Yopyyopy	Centre-left politics	1 / 118
New Generation Party	NGP	Bire Kimisopa	Centralized government	1 / 118
Our Development Party	ODP	Charles Abel		1 / 118
People's Labour Party	PLP	Benedict Simanjuang	Christian democracy	1 / 118
People's Movement for Change	PMC	Gary Juffa	Nationalism; Anti-imperialism	1 / 118
People's Progress Party	PPP	Douglas Tomuriesa		1 / 118
People's Reform Party	PRP	James Donald		1 / 118
Papua New Guinea Destiny Party	Destiny	Marsh Narawec		1 / 118
Triumph Heritage Empowerment Party	THE Party	Don Polye	Christian democracy; Conservatism	1 / 118
Independent	—N/a			10 / 118

=== Other registered parties ===
As of May 2019, the list of registered parties is:

- Christian Democratic Party (CDP)
- Coalition for Reform Party (CFRP)
- Grassroot United Front Party (GRUF)
- Mapai Levites Party (MLP)
- Melanesian Liberal Party (MLP)
- Model Nation Party (PKP)
- National Conservative Party (NCP)
- Nations' Interest Party (NIP)
- Paradise Kingdom Party (PKP)
- People's Action Party (PAP)
- People's Democratic Movement (PDM)
- People's Freedom Party (UP)
- People's National Congress (PNC)
- People's Resource Awareness Party (PRAP)
- People's United Assembly Party (PUAP)
- PNG Country Party (PNCP)
- PNG First Party (PNGFP)
- PNG Human Rights Party (PNGHRP)
- PNG One Nation Party (PONP)
- PNG Socialist Party (PNGSP)
- PNG Youths Party (PNGYP)
- Republican Party (RP)
- SOM Pioneer Party (SOM)
- Star Alliance Party (SAP)
- Trust PNG Party (TPNGP)
- United Party (UP)
- Wantok in Godly Services Party (WINGS)

== Defunct or non-registered parties ==
- Advance PNG Party (APNGP)
- Economic Endeavour Party (EEP)
- Human Rights Protection Party (HRPP)
- Kingdom First Party
- Liberal Party (LP)
- Melanesian Labour Party (MLP)
- Melanesian People's Party (MPP)
- National Advance Party
- National Front Party (NFP)
- Nation Transformation Party (NTP)
- National Vision for Humanity Party (NVHP)
- One People Party (OPP)
- Pan Melanesian Congress Party (PMCP)
- Papua Besena
- Party for Justice and Dignity (PJD)
- People's Destiny & Development Party (PDDP)
- People's Development Party (PDP)
- People's First Conservative Party (PFCP)
- People's Heritage Party (PHP)
- People's Solidarity Party (PSP)
- People's Unity Party
- People's Welfare Party (PWP)
- PNG Conservative Party
- PNG Constitutional Democratic Party (PNGCDP)
- PNG Labour Party
- PNG Integrity Party (PNGIP)
- PNG Revival Party (PNGRP)
- Rural Development Party
- Rural Pipols' Pati (RPP)
- Simple People's Party (SPP)
- True People's Party (TPP)
- Yumi Reform Party (YRP)

League for National Advancement (LNA)

== Parties active only in Bougainville ==
- Bougainville Independence Movement
- Bougainville Labour Party
- Bougainville People's Congress
- New Bougainville Party

== See also ==
- Politics of Papua New Guinea
- List of political parties by country
