= Members of the National Parliament of Papua New Guinea, 2002–2007 =

This is a list of members of the National Parliament of Papua New Guinea from 2002 to 2007 as elected at the 2002 election.

Member	Party	Electorate	Province	Term in office
Sam Abal (Note: The National Court declared the election of Wabag Open MP Sam Abal to be void on 21 March 2003 due to electoral irregularities. Abal won the resulting by-election in November 2004.)	People's Democratic Movement	Wabag Open	Enga	2002–2003, 2004–2012
Sam Akoitai	United Resources Party	Central Bougainville Open	Bougainville	1997–2007
Tony Aimo	People's Action Party	Ambunti-Dreikikir Open	East Sepik	2002–2012, 2012–2013
Martin Aini	Pangu Party	Kavieng Open	New Ireland	2002–2012
Benny Allan	Independent	Unggai-Bena Open	Eastern Highlands	2002–present
Fr Louis Ambane (Note: Chimbu Provincial MP Louis Ambane died on 10 May 2003. Peter Launa won the resulting by-election in June 2004.)	National Alliance Party	Chimbu Provincial	Chimbu	1997–1998, 1999–2003
Tom Amukele	Pipol First Party	Okapa Open	Eastern Highlands	2002–2007
David Anggo (Note: The National Court declared the election of Chuave Open MP David Anggo to be void on 9 September 2005 due to electoral irregularities. Jim Nomane, the successful petitioner against Anggo, won the resulting by-election in August 2006.)	Nation Transformation Party	Chuave Open	Chimbu	2002–2005
Mark Anis	Christian Democratic Party	Tambul-Nebilyer Open	Western Highlands	2002–2007
Sir Moi Avei	Melanesian Alliance Party	Kairuku-Hiri Open	Central	1992–2007
Andrew Baing (Note: Markham Open MP Andrew Baing was dismissed from office in December 2006 after being found guilty of misappropriation by a leadership tribunal. A by-election was not held due to the proximity of the 2007 election.)	People's Progress Party	Markham Open	Morobe	1992–2006
David Basua (Note: In August 2012, after serious problems with voting in the Southern Highlands Province, the Papua New Guinea Electoral Commission declared the 2012 election to have failed in six electorates: Southern Highlands Provincial, Koroba-Lake Kopiago Open, Tari-Pori Open, Kagua-Erave Open, Komo-Magarima Open and Imbonggu Open. A supplementary election was held in the six electorates between 26 April and 9 May 2003. The six elected members (David Basua, Balus Libe, Timothy Tala, Petrus Thomas, Tom Tomiape and Hami Yawari) were sworn in on 28 May 2003.)	People's Democratic Movement	Kagua-Erave Open	Southern Highlands	1997–1998, 1999–2007
Yuntuvi Bao	People's Labour Party	Kainantu Open	Eastern Highlands	2002–2007
Sir Peter Barter	Independent	Madang Provincial	Madang	1992–1997, 2002–2007
Charlie Benjamin	Advance PNG Party	Manus Open	Manus	1997–2007, 2012–present
Roy Biyama	PNG Revival Party	Middle Fly Open	Western	2002–present
Sinai Brown	National Alliance Party	Gazelle Open	East New Britain	2000–2007
Atimeng Buhupe	Pangu Party	Telefomin Open	West Sepik	2002–2007
Dr Banare Bun	Christian Democratic Party	Henganofi Open	Eastern Highlands	2002–2007
Byron Chan	People's Progress Party	Namatanai Open	New Ireland	2002–2017
Bob Dadae	United Party	Kabwum Open	Morobe	2002–2017
Dr Bob Danaya	PNG Labour Party	Western Provincial	Western	2002–2012
Leo Dion	National Alliance Party	East New Britain Provincial	East New Britain	2000–2017
Cecilking Doruba	PNG First Party	Ijivitari Open	Northern	2002–2007
William Duma	Independent	Hagen Open	Western Highlands	2002–present
Teta Geoka	National Alliance Party	Menyamya Open	Morobe	2002–2007
Mathew Gubag	People's Democratic Movement	Sumkar Open	Madang	1997–2007
Bernard Hagoria (Note: Yangoru-Saussia Open MP Bernard Hagoria was dismissed from office in September 2003 after being found guilty of misappropriation by a leadership tribunal. Peter Waranaka won the resulting by-election in May 2004.)	People's Democratic Movement	Yangoru-Saussia Open	East Sepik	2000–2003
Chris Haiveta	Pangu Party	Gulf Provincial	Gulf	1992–2007, 2017–present
Leo Hannett (Note: Bougainville Provincial MP John Momis resigned in April 2005 to contest the inaugural Bougainville presidential election. Leo Hannett won the resulting by-election in January 2006.)	National Alliance Party	Bougainville Provincial	Bougainville	2006–2007
Conrad Haoda	Pangu Party	South Fly Open	Western	2002–2007
John Hickey	National Alliance Party	Bogia Open	Madang	2002–2017
Bani Hoivo	National Alliance Party	Northern Provincial	Northern	2002–2007
Fabian Inne	Rural Pipol's Pati	Goilala Open	Central	2002–2007
Philip Inou	People's Action Party	Vanimo-Green River Open	West Sepik	2002–2007
Peter Ipatas	People's Democratic Movement	Enga Provincial	Enga	1997–present
Dr Jacob Jumogot	People's Democratic Movement	Manus Provincial	Manus	2002–2007
Miki Kaeok	People's Labour Party	Wapenamanda Open	Enga	2002–2012
Michael Mas Kal	PNG National Party	North Waghi Open	Western Highlands	2002–2007
Hon Gabriel Kapris	People's Action Party	Maprik Open	East Sepik	2002–2012
Kimson Kare	Nation Transformation Party	Wewak Open	East Sepik	2002–2007
John Kekeno (Note: The National Court declared the election of Koroba-Lake Kopiago Open MP Petrus Thomas to be void on 3 January 2005. John Kekeno won the resulting by-election in July 2006.)	People's Action Party	Koroba-Lake Kopiago Open	Southern Highlands	2006–2012
Ben Kiagi	United Party	Daulo Open	Eastern Highlands	2002–2007
Lady Carol Kidu	Melanesian Alliance Party	Moresby South Open	NCD	1997–2012
Bire Kimisopa	United Party	Goroka Open	Eastern Highlands	2002–2007, 2012–2017
Kuri Kingal	Independent	Baiyer-Mul Open	Western Highlands	2002–2007
Alois Kingsley	Independent	Madang Open	Madang	2002–2007
John Koigiri	People's Solidarity Party	Obura-Wonenara Open	Eastern Highlands	2002–2007
Robert Kopaol	People's Progress Party	Nipa-Kutubu Open	Southern Highlands	2002–2007
Nick Kuman	Independent	Gumine Open	Chimbu	2002–2007, 2013–present
Andrew Kumbakor	People's Democratic Movement	Nuku Open	West Sepik	1997–2012
Francis Kunai	PNG National Party	Jimi Open	Western Highlands	2002–2007
Michael Laimo	National Alliance Party	South Bougainville Open	Bougainville	1992–2008
Peter Launa	United Resources Party	Chimbu Provincial	Chimbu	2004–2007
Balus Libe	People's Labour Party	Komo-Magarima Open	Southern Highlands	1992–1994, 1995–1996, 2003–2007
Ian Ling-Stuckey	Pangu Party	New Ireland Provincial	New Ireland	1997–2007, 2017–present
Mark Maipakai	People's Progress Party	Kikori Open	Gulf	2002–2017
Dickson Maki	PNG Country Party	Kompiam-Ambum Open	Enga	2002–2007
Moses Maladina	Independent	Esa'ala Open	Milne Bay	2002–2012
Dr Allan Marat	People's Progress Party	Rabaul Open	East New Britain	2002–present
Jamie Maxtone-Graham (Note: Anglimp-South Waghi Open MP Paul Wai died on 29 July 2003. Jamie Maxtone-Graham won the resulting by-election in June 2004.)	Independent	Anglimp-South Waghi Open	Western Highlands	2004–2012
Posi Menai	Independent	Karimui-Nomane Open	Chimbu	2002–2012
Fr John Momis	National Alliance Party	Bougainville Provincial	Bougainville	1972–2005
Sir Mekere Morauta	People's Democratic Movement	Moresby North-West Open	NCD	1997–2012, 2017–present
Alphonse Moroi	Independent	Central Provincial	Central	2002–2012
John Muingnepe	People's Democratic Movement	Bulolo Open	Morobe	2002–2007
Clement Nakmai	Independent	West New Britain Provincial	West New Britain	2000–2007
Michael Nali	People's Progress Party	Mendi Open	Southern Highlands	1992–2007, 2017–present
Sir Rabbie Namaliu	Pangu Party	Kokopo Open	East New Britain	1982–2007
Jeffrey Nape	National Alliance Party	Sinasina-Yonggamugl Open	Chimbu	2002–2012
Tim Neville	Independent	Milne Bay Provincial	Milne Bay	1992–1997, 2002–2007
Jim Nomane	Independent	Chuave Open	Chimbu Provincial	2006–2012
Peter O'Neill	People's Solidarity Party	Ialibu-Pangia Open	Southern Highlands	2002–present
Peter Oresi	People's National Congress	Sohe Open	Northern Province	2002–2007
Melchior Pep	PNG National Party	Dei Open	Western Highlands	1987–1992, 2002–2007
Bart Philemon	National Alliance Party	Lae Open	Morobe	1992–2012
Don Polye	National Alliance Party	Kandep Open	Enga	2002–2009, 2009–2017
Patrick Pruaitch	Independent	Aitape-Lumi Open	West Sepik	2002–present
Brian Pulayasi	People's Action Party	Kiriwina-Goodenough Open	Milne Bay	2002–2007
Ekis Ropenu	People's Labour Party	Kerema Open	Gulf	2002–2007
Ben Semri (Note: The National Court declared the election of Middle Ramu Open MP Ben Semri to be void on 17 March 2003 and declared runner-up Tommy Tomscoll to have been the duly elected MP. Tomscoll was sworn in as an MP in April, but Semri won a Supreme Court appeal later in the year and was ordered to be reinstated.)	People's Action Party	Middle Ramu Open	Madang	2002–2012
Yawa Silupa	National Alliance Party	Lufa Open	Eastern Highlands	2002–2012
Bill Skate (Note: National Capital District Provincial MP Bill Skate died on 3 January 2006. Wari Vele won the resulting by-election in July 2006.)	People's National Congress	Nat. Capital District Provincial	NCD	1992–2006
Mathew Siune	People's Democratic Movement	Kundiawa Open	Chimbu	2002–2007
Malcolm 'Kela' Smith	Independent	Eastern Highlands Provincial	Eastern Highlands	2002–2012
Arthur Somare	National Alliance Party	Angoram Open	East Sepik	1997–2012
Sir Michael Somare	National Alliance Party	East Sepik Provincial	East Sepik	1968–2017
David Sui	Pan Melanesian Congress	Kandrian-Gloucester Open	West New Britain	2002–2007
Martin Tabi	Rural Pipol's Pati	North Fly Open	Western	2002–2007
Isaac Taitibe	Independent	Alotau Open	Milne Bay	2002–2007
Timothy Tala	People's Progress Party	Imbonggu Open	Southern Highlands	2003–2007
Dr Puka Temu (Note: The National Court declared the election of Abau Open MP Puka Temu to be void on 5 March 2003. Temu won the resulting by-election in December.)	National Alliance Party	Abau Open	Central	2002–2003, 2003–present
Petrus Thomas	People's Progress Party	Koroba-Lake Kopiago Open	Southern Highlands	2003–2005, 2017–present
Paul Tiensten	People's Progress Party	Pomio Open	East New Britain	2002–2014
James Togel	National Alliance Party	North Bougainville Open	Bougainville	2002–2007
Tom Tomiape	People's Action Party	Tari Open	Southern Highlands	1997–2007
Tommy Tomscoll	People's Democratic Movement	Middle Ramu Open	Madang	1997–2002, 2003, 2012–2017
Anderson Vele	Melanesian Alliance Party	Rigo Open	Central	2002–2007
Wari Vele	National Alliance Party	Nat. Capital District Provincial	NCD	2006–2007
John Vulupindi	Independent	Talasea Open	West New Britain	2002–2007
Paul Wai	Christian Democratic Party	Anglimp-South Waghi Open	Western Highlands	2002–2003
Peter Waranaka	National Alliance Party	Yangoru-Saussia Open	East Sepik	2004–2012
Luther Wenge	Pipol First Party	Morobe Provincial	Morobe	1997–2012
Gordon Wesley	One People Party	Samarai-Murua Open	Milne Bay	2002–2014, 2016–2017
Alphonse Willie	National Alliance Party	Kerowagi Open	Chimbu	2002–2007
Paias Wingti	People's Democratic Movement	Western Highlands Provincial	Western Highlands	1977–2007, 2012–present
Casper Wollom (Note: The National Court declared the election of Moresby North East Open MP Casper Wollom to be void on 30 April 2004. Wollom won the resulting by-election later in the year.)	People's Democratic Movement/ People's National Congress	Moresby North-East Open	NCD	2002–2004, 2004–2007
James Yali	National Alliance Party	Rai Coast Open	Madang	2002–2007
Peter Yama	People's Labour Party	Usino Bundi Open	Madang	1994–1997, 2002–2007, 2017–present
Kappa Yarka	Independent	Lagaip-Porgera Open	Enga	2002–2007
Hami Yawari	People's Democratic Movement	Southern Highlands Provincial	Southern Highlands	2003–2007
Gallus Yumbui	Pan Melanesian Congress	Wosera Gaui Open	East Sepik	1997–2007
Carlos Yuni	Independent	West Sepik Provincial	West Sepik	2002–2007
Mao Zeming (Note: Tewae-Siassi Open MP Mao Zeming was dismissed from office in May 2003 after being found guilty of misappropriation by a leadership tribunal. The seat remained vacant for the rest of the term, as by the time the National Court ruled on his final appeal in February 2006, it was too close to the 2007 election.)	People's Democratic Movement	Tewae-Siassi Open	Morobe	1995–2003, 2012–2017
Sasa Zibe	National Alliance Party	Huon Gulf Open	Morobe	2002–2012
Guao Zurenuoc	People's Progress Party	Finschhafen Open	Morobe	2002–2007
Wesley Zurenuc	National Vision for Humanity	Nawae Open	Morobe	2002–2007
