= Sinasina-Yonggomugl District =

Sinesine-Yonggamugl District
- Location within Papua New Guinea
- Coordinates: 6.09533°S 145.02236°E
- Country: Papua New Guinea
- Province: Chimbu Province
- Capital: Yonggomugl

Government
  - MP: Kerenga Kua

Area
  - Total: 358 km^{2} (138 sq mi)

Population (2024 census)
  - Total: 67,055
  - Density: 187/km^{2} (485/sq mi)
- Time zone: UTC+10 (AEST)

Sinasina-Yonggomugl District is a district of the Simbu Province of Papua New Guinea. Its capital is Kamtai. The population was 56,805 at the 2011 census, and 67,055 in the 2024 census.

Population census
Year	Pop.	±% p.a.
1980	20,168	—
1990		—
2000	38,015	—
2011	56,805	+3.72%
2024	67,055	+1.28%

== Electoral history ==
The current member of the National Parliament is Kerenga Kua, leader of the National Party. He has been the MP since 2012.

During the 1992 Papua New Guinean general election, this district had 48 candidates, the most of any seat, and the lowest vote share for the winning candidate Kerenga Okoro, at 6.3% of votes cast (1,532 out of 24,288).

=== List of district elections ===
2022 general election: Sinasina-Yonggomugl (First preference)
Party	Candidate	Votes	%	±%
National Party	Kerenga Kua	7,449	14.45	−12.98
THE Party	Mark Gunua Ulka	3,385	6.57	N/A
Independent	John Gelua	2,939	5.70	N/A
Independent	Elijah Ilai Kua	2,757	5.35	N/A
NAP	Peter Kama	2,703	5.24	N/A
Independent	Kennedy Wemin	2,450	4.75	N/A
Independent	Joseph Numapo Kuabal	2,336	4.53	N/A
Independent	John Dabele Dege	2,303	4.47	−3.18
SDP	Mark Kumul	2,018	3.91	N/A
Independent	Paul Miamel	1,953	3.79	N/A
PNC	Morre Kamtai	1,938	3.76	N/A
Independent	Camillus Mondia Gagma	1,629	3.16	N/A
Country Party	Mawe Dala	1,605	3.11	N/A
Liberal	John Aramba	1,446	2.80	N/A
Independent	Peter Kiage	1,435	2.78	N/A
NGP	John Bagme	1,377	2.67	N/A
Independent	Ludger Luker Mond	1,354	2.62	−3.47
Independent	Martin Tonny	1,322	2.56	N/A
Independent	David Aukamane Digal	1,273	2.47	N/A
Independent	Joshua Kuntaia Kaman	1,190	2.31	N/A
Independent	Thomas Sil	939	1.82	N/A
Independent	Maima Nime	932	1.80	N/A
Independent	Karl Aina	888	1.72	−6.78
Independent	Moore Paias Poyieh	557	1.08	+0.68
Independent	Steven Gola Dom	553	1.07	−2.18
Independent	John Wawe Kagl	535	1.03	−2.53
Independent	Roderick Miopa Nilkapp	471	0.91	N/A
Independent	Buckley Buckhill Dama	187	0.36	N/A
Independent	Warren Kume	185	0.36	N/A
Independent	John Kuri	180	0.35	N/A
Independent	Ben Okoro	169	0.33	N/A
Independent	Stewart Boyd	144	0.28	N/A
Independent	Robert Gundu	116	0.23	N/A
Independent	Nick Appa Mathew	100	0.19	N/A
Independent	John Mawe	94	0.18	N/A
Independent	Bafinuc Taul Ilai	78	0.15	N/A
Independent	Aula Naru Kobale	77	0.15	−0.82
Independent	Nilemoa Joe	32	0.06	N/A
MLP	Simon Gigil	27	0.05	+0.03
Independent	Ilai Buafec Buge	10	0.02	−1.17
Independent	Bal Mark Roy	9	0.02	−0.01
Independent	Dom David Kua	5	<0.01	−4.69
Independent	Koromino Lapun Otto	5	<0.01	N/A
PAP	Joe Kile	3	<0.01	N/A
Independent	Jeremiah Maule Ninkama	2	<0.01	−0.01
Majority		4,064	7.88	−10.89
Turnout		51,515	99.84	+1.53
Rejected ballots		355	0.69	−0.16
Registered electors		51,595		
National Party hold		Swing	−12.98	

=== List of MPs elected ===
Election	Member	Party	Notes
1972	Kobale Kale		Seat known as 'Sinasina Open'
1977; 1982	Clement Kwipa Boye		Known as 'Clement Kuipa Poiye' in 1982 records.
1987	John Numi	National Party	
1992	Kerenga Okoro	Independent	
1997	Ludger Mond	People's Action Party	
2002; 2007	Jeffery Nape	National Alliance Party	Speaker of the National Parliament (2004–2012); Acting Governor General (2004, and 2010)
2012; 2017; 2022	Kerenga Kua	National Party	Leader of the National Party (2016–present); Minister for Petroleum (2019–2022); Minister for Petroleum and Energy (2022–2024)
