= Josephine Abaijah =

Papua New Guinean politician (born 1940)

Dame Josephine Abaijah

Member of the National Parliament
- In office 1972–1977
- Preceded by: Oala Oala-Rarua
- Constituency: Central Provincial
- In office 1977–1982
- Succeeded by: Phillip Bouraga
- Constituency: National Capital District Provincial
- In office 1997–2002
- Preceded by: Tim Neville
- Succeeded by: Tim Neville
- Constituency: Milne Bay Provincial

Personal details
- Born: 23 June 1940 (age 85) Misima, Territory of Papua

Dame Josephine Abaijah, GCL DBE (born 23 June 1940) is a Papua New Guinean former politician. She was the first woman to be elected to the House of Assembly in 1972.

== Biography ==
Born in Misima and one of 17 children, Abaijah began working in the Department of Public Health after leaving school, becoming a health education specialist. She also attended the University of London, where she obtained a diploma. She also played netball for the Papua New Guinea territory team, becoming vice-captain.

She contested the Central Provincial seat in the 1972 elections, becoming the first woman to win a seat in the House of Assembly, and only the second female legislator in Papua New Guinea after Doris Booth (who had been an appointed member in the 1950s). Abaijah was the only woman elected at that time. After being elected, she founded and led the Papua Besena movement, which agitated unsuccessfully for Papua to become a separate independent country instead of being linked with New Guinea as Papua New Guinea.

She was re-elected in 1977 in the National Capital District Provincial constituency, but was defeated by Phillip Bouraga in the 1982 elections. She ran unsuccessfully again in 1987 and 1992.

Asked by the Pacific Journalism Review for her opinion as to why there were (in 1995) no women in Papua New Guinea's Parliament, she stated:

I maintain that I will not give money to somebody to vote for me. So I think that's one big reason. The men can get money, the men can bribe. We are finding it very difficult for women to go around bribing people. I think this is where the country is going nowhere because here there is a lot of bribes, there is a lot of corruption, something that women don't want in this country.

However, Abaijah returned to parliament after winning the Milne Bay Provincial seat in 1997, unseating Tim Neville. She lost the seat to Neville in the 2002 elections.

Her autobiography, A Thousand Coloured Dreams, was published in 1991.
