= John Waiko =

Papua New Guinean academic and politician (1945–2024)

John Dademo Waiko
- Dademo
- Born: 8 August 1945; Tabara, Northern Province, Territory of Papua
- Died: 17 November 2024 (aged 79)
- Occupations: Playwright; politician; anthropologist
- Notable work: The Unexpected Hawk

John Dademo Waiko (8 August 1945 – 17 November 2024) was a Papua New Guinean historian, anthropologist, playwright and politician.

Waiko was born in the village of Tabara in the Northern Province.

== Education ==
He obtained a PhD in Social Sciences from the Australian National University, thus becoming the first Papua New Guinean to earn a PhD of any kind.

== Career ==
In 1986, he was the first Papua New Guinean to be appointed Professor, and became head of the History department at the University of Papua New Guinea. He published a number of articles on the history, culture and politics of his country. His book A Short History of Papua New Guinea was first published in 1993.

He was also the author of a play, The Unexpected Hawk, published in 1971.

In 1992, Waiko was elected to Parliament, beginning his national political career. He was Minister for Foreign Affairs from 2001 to 2002, before losing his seat in Parliament in the June 2002 general election. In the 2007 general election, he stood unsuccessfully for election at the Sohe Open constituency, representing the new Papua New Guinea Party.

Waiko was controversially involved with a prominent Malaysian businessman in the logging industry in Papua New Guinea, Philip Lee. After Lee had "fraudulently obtained three Papua New Guinea passports and was found guilty of violating PNG immigration laws", Foreign Affairs Minister John Pundari ordered his deportation. Pundari was sacked by Prime Minister Mekere Morauta, and replaced by Waiko, who suspended and reviewed the deportation order. When it was revealed in February 2002 that Waiko and Lee "held shares in the same company", and Waiko admitted they were "business partners", PNG Forest Watch expressed its concern over a "clear conflict of interest" and urged Waiko to resign. Papua New Guinea's Trade Union Congress also called for Waiko to be sacked.

Waiko was the subject of two biographical films. He was the subject of, starred in, and was associate producer of, the 1990 film Man Without Pigs, by Chris Owen. In 2007, he starred in Minister Without Money, a short film by Sandra Welkerling, focused on his political career, set against the wider context of Papua New Guinean politics.

== Personal life and death ==
Waiko married Anne Dickson-Waiko (1950–2018), a professor at the University of Papua New Guinea. They had one son. John Waiko died on 17 November 2024, at the age of 79.
