= Morauta =

Morauta is a surname. Notable people with the surname include:

- Louise Morauta (born 1945), anthropologist and public servant in Australia, wife of Mekere
- Mekere Morauta (1946–2020), Papua New Guinean politician and economist
