= Waliyato Clowes =

Papua New Guinean politician

Waliyato Clowes is a Papua New Guinean politician. She was a member of the National Parliament of Papua New Guinea from 1977 to 1982, representing the Middle Fly Open electorate in Western Province.

Clowes was a school teacher before entering politics. She was elected to the National Parliament of Papua New Guinea in the 1977 election, when she was only in her mid-20s. She supported John Guise over Michael Somare for Prime Minister. Initially associated with the United Party, she was later linked with the National Party and Papua Besena before founding her own party, Papuan Alliance (or Panal) in 1980. Her party sought to coordinate all the unaligned Papuan members of parliament, and had "up to eight" MPs, described as "moderate Papuan politicians" as distinct from the more radical Papua Besena. Clowes and her party supported the government of Julius Chan. She was described as a "proponent of women's rights". Clowes was defeated at the 1982 election.
