= Isaac Joseph =

Former politician from Papua New Guinea

Isaac Joseph (born 19 September 1975) is a Papua New Guinean politician. He was a New Generation Party member of the National Parliament of Papua New Guinea from July 2007 until 2012, representing the electorate of Mendi Open.

Joseph was a church pastor before entering politics. He was elected to the open seat vacated by Michael Nali, who made an unsuccessful attempt to shift to the Southern Highlands Regional seat. He was subsequently appointed Shadow Minister for the Public Service by Opposition Leader Sir Mekere Morauta. He has been critical of past neglect within the Mendi area, and has pledged to push for a number of reforms, including new development initiatives, reform of the public service, improved enforcement of law and order and an end to tribal fighting.

National Parliament of Papua New Guinea
Preceded by Michael Nali	Member for Mendi Open; 2007–2012	Succeeded by De Kewanu
