= Hugo Berghuser =

Sir Hugo Berghuser MBE (1934 – 23 August 2025) was a German-born businessman and politician in Papua New Guinea. He had business interests across a wide range of industries and served as a government minister in the late 1980s.

== Early life ==
Berghuser was born in 1934 in Bochum, Germany, and grew up in Stiepel. He immigrated to Australia in 1958, travelling aboard MS Skaubryn which caught fire and sank in the Indian Ocean during the journey. His possessions were destroyed and he arrived in Melbourne with no papers. In 1960 he moved north to the Australian-administered Territory of Papua and New Guinea, settling there permanently in 1965.

== Business career ==
Having initially worked as a carpenter and builder after arriving in PNG, Berghuser started a piggery outside of Port Moresby and expanded into smallgoods manufacturing, sausage-making and canned goods. His brands Ox & Palm bully beef, Sapphire Smallgoods and Triple 7 tinned fish were said to be "household names" in PNG. He also established a crocodile farm adjacent to the piggery, "feeding the creatures with the porcine leftovers" and producing crocodile meat and crocodile skin.

Berghuser amassed significant property interests in Port Moresby. He acquired the Papua Hotel from Burns Philp, but it proved unsuccessful and was later redeveloped. He later ran the Windjammer Beach Hotel in Wewak for over 40 years. In 1980, Berghuser commenced building Pacific View, a 15-floor apartment block in Port Moresby that was one of the town's tallest buildings and included a luxury penthouse with a helipad. The building was locally nicknamed "Hugo's Folly", but was said to have had an "an unusually high occupancy" and was popular among foreign diplomats.

According to Berguser's obituary in The National, Berghuser's business empire employed over 700 people at its peak and built a "network of enterprises that touched nearly every household in Papua New Guinea: farming, carpentry, meat processing, canning, hospitality, fishing and sustainable forestry". In 1982 he was estimated by Pacific Islands Monthly to have a net worth of A$20 million. Some aspects of his career were controversial, including allegations that his cannery had violated environmental regulations and that it had been deliberated situated outside of the city limits of Port Moresby to allow a lower minimum wage to be paid. In the 1990s he was the subject of an adverse finding by the Ombudsman Commission, which found that the National Capital District Commission (NCDC) had acquired Durand Farm from an entity associated with Berghuser for a price significantly above market value. The property was bought in 1992 from the Agricultural Bank for K150,000, of which only K15,000 was actually paid in cash. It was then sold to the NCDC in 1994 for K675,000.

== Politics ==
Berghuser stood for parliament at the 1982 general election, running unsuccessfully in the Kairuku-Hiri District. During the campaign he attracted attention for a series of controversial remarks, accusing his opponents of "sell[ing] the country for a couple of Filipino girls" and describing Adolf Hitler as "not a good man, not a bad man" and praising Hitler's land reforms.

At the 1987 election, Berghuser was elected to the National Parliament as an independent candidate in the National Capital District. He served as minister for lands and tourism and minister for civil aviation in the governments of Rabbie Namaliu and Paias Wingti, where he was credited with "major infrastructure initiatives and a strong focus on community development". As aviation minister he was involved in a "long-standing dispute" with Dennis Buchanan, the founder of PNG's leading private airline Talair, over accusations of favouritism towards the state-owned Air Niugini.

During the start of the Bougainville conflict in the late 1980s, Berghuser served as chairman of the parliamentary national emergency committee. In 1989 he described the conflict as a "rebellion and insurgency" and called for the deployment of the PNG Defence Force.

== Personal life and honours ==
Berghuser had four children, He died in Wewak on 23 August 2025, aged 91.

Berghuser was created a Knight Bachelor in 1989. He was also a Member of the Order of the British Empire (MBE).
