= John Pundari =

Papua New Guinean politician

The Honourable Sir John Pundari KBE, CMG, MP
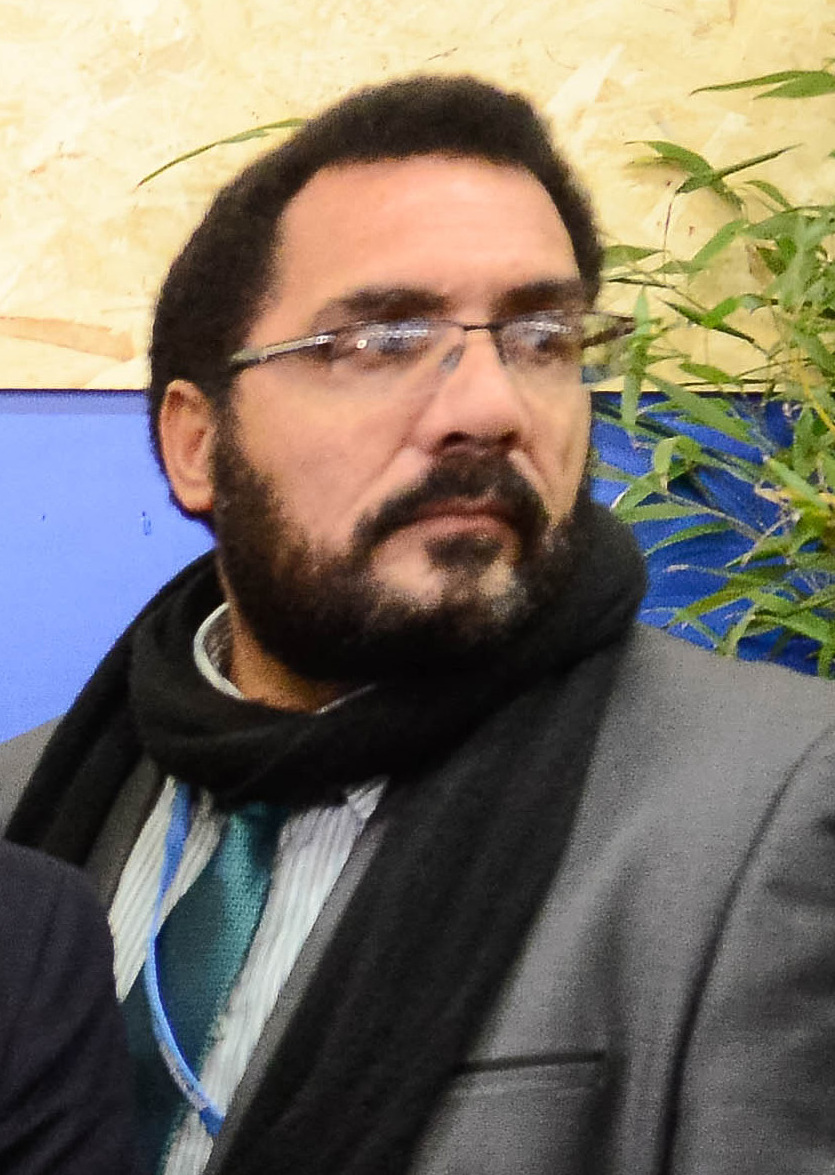
- Pundari in 2015

Minister for Finance and Rural Development
- In office 20 December 2020 – 2021
- Prime Minister: James Marape
- Preceded by: Renbo Paita
- Succeeded by: Renbo Paita

Speaker of the National Parliament of Papua New Guinea
- In office 22 July 1997 – 13 July 1999
- Preceded by: Sir Rabbie Namaliu
- Succeeded by: Iairo Lasaro

Deputy Prime Minister
- In office 15 July 1999 – 8 December 1999
- Prime Minister: Sir Mekere Morauta
- Succeeded by: Mao Zeming

Minister for Foreign Affairs
- In office 17 May 2001 – 31 October 2001
- Prime Minister: Sir Mekere Morauta
- Preceded by: Bart Philemon
- Succeeded by: John Waiko

Member of Parliament for Kompiam-Ambum
- Incumbent
- Assumed office 27 June 1992

Personal details
- Born: January 7, 1967 (age 59) Territory of Papua and New Guinea

Sir John Pundari KBE CMG (born 7 January 1967) is a Papua New Guinean politician. He has been Speaker of the National Parliament (1997–1999), Deputy Prime Minister (1999), Minister for Foreign Affairs (2001), and has served as the Minister of Finance and Rural Development from 20 December 2020 to 2021.

== Career ==
First elected to Parliament in the 1992 general election, as MP for Kompiam-Ambum, he was elected Speaker after retaining his seat in the 1997 election. He founded the Advance Papua New Guinea Party in May 1999, with twenty-two MPs, announcing his intention to challenge for the premiership. He accused Prime Minister Bill Skate's government of persistent political interference in administrative processes, including police investigations, and of a general lack of ethics. Pundari resigned as Speaker in July, and helped Sir Mekere Morauta form a majority in Parliament to successfully challenge for the premiership. Morauta, as the new prime minister, appointed him deputy prime minister and Minister for Women, Youth and Churches. In December, however, Morauta sacked him, citing the need for "political stability" in the coalition government. Pundari and his party were re-admitted to the Morauta government in April 2000, and he was appointed Minister for Lands and Physical Planning, then Minister for Foreign Affairs in May 2001. In October, he was sacked again, after disagreeing publicly with Morauta on the question of Papua New Guinea's participation in the Australian government's "Pacific Solution". Australia had begun deporting to a detention camp in Papua New Guinea asylum seekers who had arrived by boat in Australia; Pundari opposed the sending of 1,000 additional detainees to the camp.

He founded the Papua New Guinea Revival Party and led it into the 2002 election. He retained his seat in the 2007 election, this time as a member of the National Advance Party, and was appointed Minister for Mining by Prime Minister Sir Michael Somare in July 2010. Somare was replaced as prime minister by Peter O'Neill in August 2011, and Pundari lost his position in government. Becoming a member of O'Neill's People's National Congress Party, he was appointed Minister for the Environment and Conservation in O'Neill's government following the 2012 general election.

== Personal life ==
Pundari is an active member and leader of the Seventh-day Adventist Church in Papua New Guinea.

The Honorable John Pundari, was recognized as a Companion of the Order of St Michael and St George for his services to his country as a Member of the National Parliament, by Queen Elizabeth II on her birthday in 2014.

In 2022, Pundari founded the Liberal Party to compete in the 2022 Papua New Guinean general election.

Political offices
Preceded by Iairo Lasaro	Deputy Prime Minister of Papua New Guinea; 1999	Succeeded by Mao Zeming
Preceded by Bart Philemon	Minister for Foreign Affairs; 2001	Succeeded by John Waiko
Preceded by Renbo Paita	Minister for Finance and Rural Development; 2020–2021	Succeeded by Renbo Paita
National Parliament of Papua New Guinea
Preceded by Sir Rabbie Namaliu	Speaker of the National Parliament of Papua New Guinea; 1997–1999	Succeeded by Iairo Lasaro
