= Iairo Lasaro =

Papua New Guinean politician

The Honourable Iairo Lasaro

Deputy Prime Minister of Papua New Guinea
- In office October 1998 – July 1999
- Prime Minister: Sir Bill Skate
- Preceded by: Michael Nali
- Succeeded by: John Pundari

Speaker of the National Parliament of Papua New Guinea
- In office 13 July 1999 – 14 July 1999
- Prime Minister: Sir Bill Skate
- Preceded by: John Pundari
- Succeeded by: Bernard Narokobi

Member of Parliament for Alotau
- In office 1987–2002

Personal details
- Died: 13 May 2023
- Party: People's Democratic Movement (as of 1997)

Iairo Lasaro (died 13 May 2023) was a Papua New Guinean politician. He served as Deputy Prime Minister of Papua New Guinea from October 1998 to July 1999 under Prime Minister Bill Skate. He has held various ministries in the cabinet and shadow cabinet, being the Minister for Finance (Sep – Dec 1997) and then the Minister for Treasury (Dec 1997 – Jul 1999) in the Skate administration. He was member of parliament for Alotau Open Electorate from 1987 to 2002, having been re-elected twice. He was elected Speaker of the National Parliament on 13 July 1999 with 57 votes in favour and 45 against, but resigned the next day as Skate had lost the prime ministerial vote to Mekere Morauta that morning; Bernard Narokobi was elected the next speaker in a unanimous vote.

Political offices
Preceded by Michael Nali	Deputy Prime Minister of Papua New Guinea; 1998–1999	Succeeded by John Pundari
National Parliament of Papua New Guinea
Preceded by John Pundari	Speaker of the National Parliament of Papua New Guinea; 1999	Succeeded by Bernard Narokobi
