= De Kewanu =

Papua New Guinean politician (born 1965)

De Kewanu (born 7 June 1965) is a Papua New Guinean politician. He was a member of the National Parliament of Papua New Guinea from 2012 to 2017, representing the electorate of Mendi Open, firstly as an independent (2012) then the Triumph Heritage Empowerment Party (2013-2014) and then finally shifted to the People's National Congress (2014–present). He was Vice-Minister for Works and Implementation in the government of Peter O'Neill.

Kewanu was an accountant who ran a successful accounting practice in PNG known as HLB Niugini before entering politics. He also had a run for election in 1997 but was unsuccessful. He was elected to the National Parliament as an independent candidate at the 2012 election, defeating Isaac Joseph. Kewanu was appointed Vice-Minister for Works and Implementation after the election. He supported calls for the relaxation of Australian visa laws for those coming from Papua New Guinea. After a year in office, he was praised for effectiveness in service delivery, having boosted road construction efforts and funding for local schools. In May 2014, he joined the governing People's National Congress. He lost his seat to former Deputy Prime Minister Michael Nali at the 2017 election.

National Parliament of Papua New Guinea
| Preceded by Isaac Joseph | Member for Mendi Open; 2012–2017 | Succeeded by Michael Nali |
