= 1997 Papua New Guinean general election =

- 14–28 June 1997
Party	Leader	Vote %	Seats	+/–
NAP	Michael Somare	6.48	8	New
PPP	Julius Chan	6.47	16	+8
Pangu Pati	Chris Haiveta	5.31	15	−5
PDM	Mekere Morauta	4.42	8	−7
PAP	Ted Diro	4.10	4	−8
MAP	Bernard Narokobi	1.82	5	−2
United Party	Bire Kimisopa	1.75	3	+3
PUP	David Unagi	1.74	2	New
CDP	Dilu Goma	1.57	1	New
PNC	Bill Skate	1.56	5	New
PRAP	Michael Uvilio	1.21	3	New
MGA	Steven Pokawi	0.50	1	New
National Party	Philip Kapal	0.33	1	−1
PSP	Kala Swokin	0.06	1	+1
Independents	–	61.46	36	−3
This lists parties that won seats. See the complete results below.
Prime Minister before	Prime Minister after
Julius Chan; PPP	Bill Skate; PNC

General elections were held in Papua New Guinea between 14 and 28 June 1997. The result was a victory for the People's Progress Party, which won 16 of the 109 seats, despite receiving fewer votes than the National Alliance Party. Voter turnout was 66%.

== Results ==
Party	Votes	%	Seats	+/–
National Alliance Party	288,965	6.48	8	New
People's Progress Party	288,634	6.47	16	+8
Pangu Pati	237,028	5.31	15	–5
People's Democratic Movement	197,331	4.42	8	–7
People's Action Party	182,845	4.10	4	–8
Melanesian Alliance Party	81,303	1.82	5	–2
United Party	77,917	1.75	3	+3
People's Unity Party	77,407	1.74	2	New
Christian Democratic Party	69,889	1.57	1	New
People's National Congress	69,593	1.56	5	New
People's Resources Awareness Party	53,753	1.21	3	New
Melanesian Labour Party	23,889	0.54	0	New
Movement for Greater Autonomy	22,344	0.50	1	New
Christian Country Party	19,536	0.44	0	New
National Party	14,689	0.33	1	–1
Milne Bay Party	7,043	0.16	0	New
People's Solidarity Party	2,473	0.06	1	+1
Liberal Party	1,337	0.03	0	–1
PNGNA	1,320	0.03	0	New
Hausman Party	792	0.02	0	New
PNG First Party	722	0.02	0	New
Independents	2,741,089	61.46	36	–3
Total	4,459,899	100.00	109	0
Total votes	2,244,531	–		
Registered voters/turnout	3,414,072	65.74		
Source: PNG Elections Database, Nohlen et al.
