= Gang of Four (Papua New Guinea) =

Group of leading civil servants in Papua New Guinea in the 1970s

The Gang of Four in Papua New Guinea (PNG) were four influential young public servants who played an important role in the planning and development of the country immediately after the country's independence from Australia in 1975.

== Origin of the name ==
The name Gang of Four came from the Maoist political group in China, composed of four Chinese Communist Party officials who were prominent during the Cultural Revolution (1966–1976) and were later charged with treason. Its leading figure was Jiang Qing, the last wife of Mao Zedong.

== In Papua New Guinea ==
In Papua New Guinea, the term began to be applied, initially in a fairly negative way, to four young public servants who headed four important government departments and played a coordinating role for policies and programmes between 1975 and the early 1980s. The name is alleged to have been coined by older Papua New Guineans, who had worked with the Australian colonial administration before independence, and resented the authority of the younger men, who had only graduated a few years before independence. The Gang of Four consisted of Charles Lepani, Mekere Morauta, Rabbie Namaliu, and Anthony Siaguru. Two went on to be prime ministers, one became a senior diplomat, and the fourth had several ministerial roles and later led the fight against corruption in the country. All received knighthoods.

=== Charles Lepani ===
Sir Charles Lepani was head of the National Planning Office of Papua New Guinea during the time of the Gang of Four. He played an important role in the development of the country's mining industry and was PNG's ambassador to the European Union from 1991 to 1994 and high commissioner in Australia between 2005 and 2017.

=== Mekere Morauta ===
Sir Mekere Morauta was prime minister between 1999 and 2002, during which he restored some stability to an economy that went through a difficult phase when Bill Skate was prime minister before him. As a member of the Gang of Four in the 1970s, Morauta led the post-independence process of building financial infrastructure in Papua New Guinea as secretary of finance. He later became managing director of the state-owned Papua New Guinea Banking Corporation, and governor of the country's central bank. Morauta died in 2020.

=== Rabbie Namaliu ===
Sir Rabbie Namaliu was a close ally of PNG's first prime minister, Michael Somare. He became PNG's fourth prime minister, between 1988 and 1992. Prior to that he was the foreign minister. During the second half of the 1970s, as a member of the Gang of Four, he headed the Public Service Commission.

=== Anthony Siaguru ===
Sir Anthony Siaguru was secretary for foreign affairs and trade from 1975 to 1982, responsible for negotiating several important agreements. He went on to hold two ministerial appointments under Somare, from 1982 to 1985, having played a leading role in the success of the Pangu Pati in the 1982 elections. Between 1990 and 1995, Siaguru served as Deputy Secretary-General for Political Affairs for the Commonwealth in its London headquarters. Siaguru campaigned against corruption in Papua New Guinea and was the founder and first chairman of the Transparency International branch in the nation's capital, Port Moresby. Siaguru died in 2004.
