= Lucy Bogari =

Papua New Guinean diplomat

Lucy Bogari CBE ISO
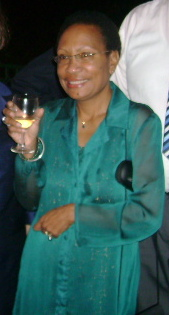
- At an Independence Day celebration at the American embassy in Port Moresby in 2007
- Born: Oro Province, Papua New Guinea
- Occupation: Diplomat

Lucy Blanche-Lee Badina Bogari CBE ISO is a Papua New Guinean diplomat. She has served as Acting Secretary of Foreign Affairs of Papua New Guinea and as Ambassador to nations including Australia, Fiji, New Zealand, South Korea and Tuvalu.

== Biography ==
Bogari is an Anglican from Oro Province, Papua New Guinea, who serves as a diplomat.

Bogari was the Papua New Guinean Ambassador to South Korea from 1992, where she encouraged potential investors in Seoul to bring business to Papua New Guinea. In 1993, she discussed in the Korean press the Papua New Guinean application to join the Asia-Pacific Economic Cooperation (APEC).

In 1995, Bogari was robbed by a gang of teenagers in Port Moresby, which was reported in the print press locally and internationally for its potential impact on foreign investment.

In 2004, Bogari was Chair of the Commission for the Conservation and Management of Highly Migratory Fish Stock in Western and Central Pacific. In 2006, Bogari was one of the candidates for the position of Director of the Solomon Islands-based Forum Fisheries Agency and served on the Regional Institutional Framework Review (RIF) Team for the South Pacific Applied Geoscience Commission (SOPAC).

Also in 2006, Bogari was appointed as Papua New Guinea's High Commissioner to New Zealand, the Cook Islands, Samoa and Niue. In 2007, she was awarded in Queen Elizabeth II of the United Kingdom's 2007 Birthday Honours, becoming a Companion of the Imperial Service Order (ISO) for distinguished public service.

Bogari was appointed as Papua New Guinea's High Commissioner to Australia in 2011, succeeding Charles Lepani to the position. In 2012, she served as Acting Secretary of Foreign Affairs and Trade Ambassador of Papua New Guinea, and also sought funding to complete the unfinished chancery building in the Solomon Islands.

Bogari served as Papua New Guinea's High Commissioner to Fiji from 2016, welcomed by the Fiji Minister for Foreign Affairs, Ratu Inoke Kubuabola. In June 2016, she presented her credentials as the Permanent Representative of Papua New Guinea to the Pacific Islands Forum to Secretary General of the Forum, Meg Taylor. She also gave Taylor gifts of tapa cloth and kotupu from the Oro Province.

In December 2016, Bogari worked towards the amendments and a Memorandum of Understanding (MOU) for a six-year extension of the South Pacific Tuna Treaty with the United States of America. She was also one of the representatives of Papua New Guinea who liaised with delegates from Fiji to resolve the 12 years impasse in the beef trade. In 2019, Bogari became the first diplomat to be commissioned to represent Papua New Guinea in Tuvalu. In 2022, Bogari was succeeded as High Commissioner to Fiji by Barbara Age.

In 2017, Bogari spoke at the inaugural Climate Action Pacific Partnership (CAPP) event. In 2019, Bogari was honoured with the Exceptional Leadership Award by the South Pacific Regional Environment Programme (SPREP), having served as chair for the previous 12 months. She was succeeded as Chair of SPREP by Peseta Noumea Simi of Samoa.

In 2018, Bogari was among Papua New Guineans awarded in Queen Elizabeth II of the United Kingdom's 2018 Birthday Honours, becoming appointed as Commander of the Order of the British Empire (CBE) for distinguished public service through her senior roles in the nation's foreign service.

In 2021, Bogari attended the funeral of Papua New Guinean "father of the nation" Michael Somare.
