= 1982 Papua New Guinean general election =

- 5–26 June 1982
- All 109 seats in the National Parliament; 55 seats needed for a majority
Party	Leader	Seats	+/–
Pangu Pati	Michael Somare	51	+21
PPP	Julius Chan	14	−2
National Party	Iambakey Okuk	13	+11
United Party	Roy Evera	9	−14
MAP	John Momis	8	New
Diro	Ted Diro	7	New
Papua Besena	Galeva Kwarara	3	−2
Independents	–	4	−23
This lists parties that won seats. See the complete results below.

General elections were held in Papua New Guinea between 5 and 26 June 1982. The result was a victory for the Pangu Party, which won 51 of the 109 seats. Voter turnout was 52%.

== Campaign ==
A total of 1,125 candidates contested the election, of which seventeen were women. Only one, Nahau Rooney, was elected. She had been standing for re-election, as had MPs Waliyato Clowes and Josephine Abaijah, who both lost their seats.

== Results ==
Following the elections, several elected MPs changed their party affiliation; the Pangu Party gained ten MPs to hold 61 seats and the National Party gained six MPs to hold 19. The People's Progress Party lost a seat, while the Melanesian Alliance lost two and the United Party lost three. All members of the Diro Independents Group left to join other parties, with no MPs left sitting as independents.

Party	Votes	%	Seats	+/–
Pangu Pati			51	+21
National Party			13	+11
People's Progress Party			14	–2
United Party			9	–15
Melanesian Alliance Party			8	New
Diro Independents Group			7	New
Papua Besena			3	–2
Papua Action Party			0	New
Independents			4	–23
Total			109	0
Total votes	1,194,114	–		
Registered voters/turnout	2,309,621	51.70		
Source: IPU, Nohlen et al.

== Aftermath ==
When the newly elected National Parliament met, Michael Somare was elected Prime Minister, defeating John Momis 66–40. Dennis Young was elected Speaker.

Position	Member
Prime Minister	Michael Somare
Deputy Prime Minister; Minister of National Planning and Development; Minister of Primary Industry	Paias Wingti
Minister of Commerce and Industry	Karl Stack
Minister of Correctional Services	Pundia Kange
Minister of Culture and Tourism	MacKenzie Jovoka
Minister of Decentralisation	John Nilkare
Minister of Defence	Epel Tito
Minister of Education	Barry Holloway
Minister of Environment and Conservation	Halalu Mai
Minister of Finance	Philip Bouraga
Minister of Foreign Relations and Trade	Rabbie Namaliu
Minister of Forests	Lukas Waka
Minister of Health	Martin Tovadek
Minister of Home Affairs	Roy Evara
Minister of Justice	Tony Bais
Minister of Labour and Employment	Kaspar Angua
Minister of Land	Bebes Korowaro
Minister of Media	Boyamo Sali
Minister of Minerals and Energy	Francis Didman
Minister of Parliamentary Services	Pita Lus
Minister of Police	John Giheno
Minister of Public Services	Anthony Siaguru
Minister of Public Utilities	Michael Pondros
Minister of Religion, Youth and Recreation	Tom Awasa
Minister of Transport and Civil Aviation	Matthew Bendumb
Minister of Urban Development	Kala Swokim
Minister of Works and Supply	Pato Kakarya
