= Anne Dickson-Waiko =

Papua New Guinean academic (1950–2018)

- Born: Anne Nealibo Dickson; 15 May 1950; Port Moresby, Papua New Guinea (PNG)
- Died: 23 April 2018 (aged 67); Port Moresby
- Other name: Anne Nealibo Dickson-Waiko
- Education: University of Papua New Guinea; University of Mississippi; Australian National University
- Occupation: University professor
- Known for: Introduction of gender studies in PNG
- Spouse(s): 1. John Kaniku; 2. John Waiko
- Children: Five

Anne Dickson-Waiko (1950–2018) was an academic from Papua New Guinea (PNG) who taught history and pioneered the teaching of gender studies in the country.

== Early life ==
Anne Nealibo Dickson-Waiko's family came from Milne Bay Province in PNG, but she was born in the capital of Port Moresby on 15 May 1950, where her father was working as an advisor to the administrator of the Territory of Papua. She was the fourth of five children. Her parents were both educated at the mission school on Kwato Island in Milne Bay Province, where her older brother and sisters were born. When she was seven, she was sent to Kwato as a boarder. From a young age she showed signs of considerable intelligence, topping her year in most grades and being the highest-ranking student in the school in 1962. She then transferred to Port Moresby High School, which was primarily a school for children of the Australian expatriate community. She was a prefect at the school, which was very unusual for a Papuan.

After leaving school she applied for a job with the government, thinking that she could perhaps be a primary school teacher. However Dickson-Waiko was sent to a new college for secondary school teachers in Goroka, in PNG's Eastern Highlands Province. She became involved in the college's drama club and played a number of leading roles. Again, she was the highest-ranking student on graduation in 1969. She then asked to be posted to schools in Port Moresby so that she could also follow courses at the new University of Papua New Guinea (UPNG). Her boyfriend, the playwright, actor and director, John Kaniku, made the same request. They married in 1971 and had a son. Finding it difficult to get to the university from the school where she had been posted, she began a job, writing course material for a community education programme. This enabled her to return to the university. She initially enrolled in a Bachelor of Education degree course before transferring to study history. While studying she continued to work, despite having had a second child. She graduated in 1977 with First-Class Honours. In 1978–81, accompanied by her husband, she studied for a master's in political science at the University of Mississippi, with a Fulbright Scholarship. Her studies were interrupted by the death of her first son.

== Career ==
In 1981, Dickson-Waiko began teaching in the UPNG history department. Inspired by John Waiko, who was the first Papua New Guinean to earn a PhD, she enrolled to do a doctorate at the Australian National University in Canberra, concentrating on women's studies. She obtained the PhD in 1994, with a dissertation with the title of A woman's place is in the struggle: feminism and nationalism in the Philippines. After completing this degree, she concentrated on teaching at UPNG and became head of the history department, teaching courses such as "Gender Issues in PNG", "Colonialism and Nation Building" and "South-East Asian History". Preferring teaching to administration, she resigned from her position as deputy dean of the school of humanities and social sciences in order to concentrate on teaching. She pioneered teaching of gender studies in PNG, authored or co-authored reports on subjects including gender-based violence and HIV/AIDS, and contributed opinion pieces to newspapers and magazines. She was a regular contributor to conferences, seminars, and workshops, with a particular interest in PNG Women's Political History, Oral History, Witchcraft, Gender and Development, and Nation Building. She played an important role in moves to have nominated seats for women in provincial and local councils.

Dickson-Waiko was president of the UPNG Women's Association between 1998 and 2003. She represented PNG in New York in 1995 and 2004 at sessions of the UN's Commission on the Status of Women. She was deputy chair of the PNG National AIDS Council from 2003 to 2006 and represented PNG again in New York for the Special UN General Assembly Session on HIV/AIDS in 2001. As a consultant she worked, mainly on gender issues, for the World Bank, World Vision, the United Nations, the European Union, the Secretariat of the Pacific Community, the Asian Development Bank, UNICEF, and others.

== Selected publications ==
Dickson-Waiko's publications included:

- 2013. Women, Nation and Decolonisation in Papua New Guinea. Journal of Pacific History 48 (2)
- 2003. The Missing Rib: Mobilizing Church Women for Change in Papua New Guinea. Oceania 74(1)
- 2001. Women, Individual Human Rights, Community Rights: Tensions within the Papua New Guinea State. In Patricia Grimshaw, Katie Holmes and Marilyn Lake, Women's Rights and Human Rights (pp 49–70)

== Death ==
Dickson-Waiko died on 23 April 2018, from cancer. She had divorced John Kaniku in the 1980s and married John Waiko. With John Kaniku she had three sons (one of whom died at a young age) and a daughter. With John Waiko she had a son.
