= Roy Biyama =

Papua New Guinean politician (1967–2021)

Roy Biyama (3 August 1967 - 11 September 2021) was a Papua New Guinean politician.

== Biography ==
He was a member of the National Parliament of Papua New Guinea from 2002 until his death, representing the electorate of Middle Fly Open. He was a member of four parties: the Papua New Guinea Revival Party, the People's Action Party, the United Resources Party and the People's National Congress. He served as Minister for Higher Education, Research, Science and Technology (2003-2004), Minister for Labour and Industrial Relations (2004-2006) and Minister Assisting the Prime Minister (2006-2007) in the Somare government. He had also been Governor of Western Province since February 2017.

Biyama was educated at Biula Community School, Awaba Secondary School and the Kiunga and Balimo Vocational Centres, where he studied as a motor mechanic and in electrical studies. He was a member of the Balimo Town Urban Council from 1999 to 2002. He was a businessman prior to entering politics.

He was elected to the National Parliament at the 2002 election for the Papua New Guinea Revival Party, but subsequently joined the People's Action Party. He has been critical of logging projects that he viewed as providing little benefit to landowners and of the Ok Tedi mine. He was promoted to Minister for Higher Education, Research, Science and Technology in the Somare government in August 2003 until he resigned amidst conflict between PAP and Prime Minister Somare's National Alliance on 18 May 2004. However, after further turmoil, he was reappointed to the ministry the same day as Minister for Labour and Industrial Relations. In August 2004, he supported Brian Pulayasi's successful challenge for the PAP leadership, ousting Moses Maladina. On 23 June 2006, he was demoted to Minister for State Assisting the Prime Minister.

Biyama was re-elected for the United Resources Party at the 2007 election. In May 2012, the Roy Biyama Building, a government office building in Balimo was opened in his honour. Having crossed to the newly-governing People's National Congress after Somare's ouster in 2011, he was re-elected for the PNC at the 2012 election. In the parliament of 2017, he was deputy chairman of the Culture and Tourism Permanent Committee and the Administrative Services Referral Committee and a member of the Emergency Permanent Committee and the Plans and Estimate Permanent Committee. He also assumed the role of Governor of Western Province in February 2017 following the conviction and imprisonment of Ati Wobiro, which fell to Biyama as the province's only remaining MP following a suspension and a death in the other two Western seats.

Biyama died of kidney failure on 11 September 2021.

National Parliament of Papua New Guinea
Preceded by Bitan Kuok	Member for Middle Fly Open; 2002–2021	Vacant
