= Charles Lepani =

Papua New Guinea public servant and diplomat (1947–2025)

Sir Charles Lepani KBE
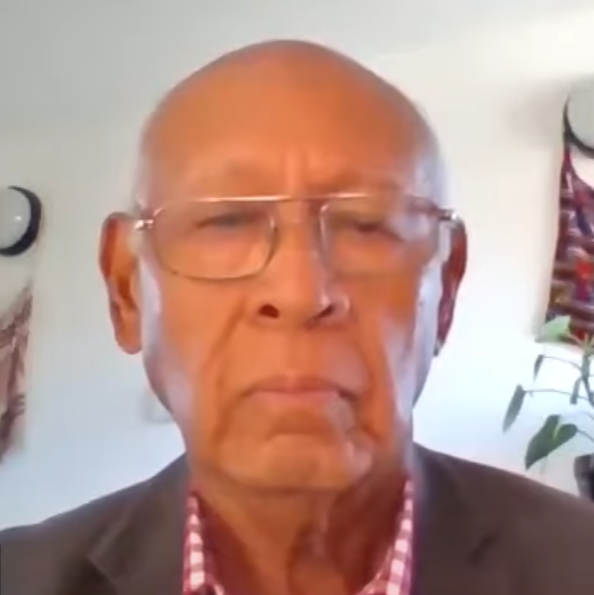
- In a Lowy Institute online discussion in 2020

Papua New Guinean high commissioner to Australia
- In office 2005–2017
- Succeeded by: Lucy Bogari

Papua New Guinean ambassador to the European Union
- In office 1991–1994

Director of the National Planning Office of Papua New Guinea
- In office 1985–1990

Personal details
- Born: 28 October 1947 Trobriand Islands, Milne Bay Province, Territory of Papua
- Died: 10 January 2025 (aged 77) Port Moresby, Papua New Guinea
- Spouse(s): 1. Barbara Lepani; 2. Katherine Lepani
- Children: With Barbara, 2; With Katherine 3.

Sir Charles Lepani, KBE (28 October 1947 – 10 January 2025) was a Papua New Guinean public servant and diplomat. He was the country's high commissioner in Australia from 2005 to 2017 and, prior to that, had been its ambassador to both the European Union and several European countries.

== Early life ==
Charles Watson Modudaya Lepani was born in the Trobriand Islands in the Milne Bay Province of Papua New Guinea (PNG). His father, Lepani Kaluweikalu Watson, had worked for the Australian colonial administration and became premier of Milne Bay Province in 1983. Lepani attended high school in Queensland, Australia and in 1967 went to the University of Papua New Guinea (UPNG), one year after the university had been opened. On graduating from UPNG with a degree in economics, he worked with PNG's Public Service Association as an industrial advocate and was then asked to head the new Bureau of Industrial Organizations, which had been set up by the PNG government and the International Labour Organization. He also studied industrial relations at the University of New South Wales, with a scholarship from the Australian Council of Trade Unions. There he met his first wife, Barbara, and they returned to PNG's capital, Port Moresby in 1972, shortly before their first son was born. The couple had a second son but separated when the elder boy was six.

== Career ==
Papua New Guinea became independent from Australia in 1975. Lepani was asked by the country's first prime minister, Michael Somare, to become head of the National Planning Office, a position he stayed in for almost six years. At the time he took the job, only his deputy was from Papua New Guinea; all other employees were expatriates. In this capacity he was involved in the formulation of PNG's macroeconomic policy and public-sector planning. During this time, he, together with Mekere Morauta, Rabbie Namaliu and Anthony Siaguru, who were all involved in different ministries coordinating policy development and government programmes, were known as the "Gang of Four". According to Lepani, this rather pejorative name came from older Papua New Guineans, who had worked with the colonial administration and resented the authority of the younger men.

In 1991, Lepani was appointed ambassador to the European Union, serving in that position until 1994. His responsibilities also made him ambassador in Belgium, Netherlands, Greece and Italy, as well as several UN agencies based in Europe. Returning to PNG, he became managing director of the Mineral Resources Development Company (MRDC), a company wholly owned by the PNG government. Some of the state's mining and petroleum assets were partially privatized in 1996, through the creation of Orogen Minerals Limited (OML), of which MRDC held a 51% stake, and Lepani then headed OML.

Lepani then studied for a master's degree in public administration from the Harvard Kennedy School in Cambridge, Massachusetts in the US, receiving a Fulbright scholarship. He worked as an advisor and consultant to the PNG government, as well as the United Nations Development Programme, United Nations Centre for Transnational Corporations and the Asian Development Bank, on a range of financial and policy issues, before being appointed in 2005 as high commissioner to Australia, based in Canberra. He stayed in that role until 2017, becoming the doyen of the diplomatic corps. Returning to PNG, Lepani became director-general of APEC Papua New Guinea 2018, in which he oversaw the meeting of APEC (Asia-Pacific Economic Cooperation) held in Port Moresby in November 2018.

In July 2020, it was announced that Lepani would become a member of the board of Geopacific Resources Ltd, a company involved in gold mining on Woodlark Island in Milne Bay Province. This mine has also caused considerable controversy because of its potential adverse impact on the environment and the fact that approval for the mine overrode traditional land rights.

== Personal life and death ==
After his divorce from Barbara Lepani, Lepani married Katherine, a U.S. national. Among their children are the former footballers Nathaniel Lepani and Andrew Lepani.

Lepani died from intestinal cancer in Port Moresby on 10 January 2025, at the age of 77.

== Awards ==
Lepani was made a Knight Commander of the Order of the British Empire (KBE) in 2017. Earlier, he had been made an Officer of the same Order (OBE) and a Commander (CBE).
