= Chris Owen (director) =

Australian film director (1944–2018)

Chris Owen (1944 – 9 March 2018) was an Australian filmmaker, who specialised in ethnographic documentary films about Papua New Guinea and its inhabitants.

He served as director of the film unit of the Institute of Papua New Guinea Studies in Port Moresby and has played a significant role in the creation of most documentaries about New Guinea since 1980.

== Filmography ==
Owen's 1984 film Tukana (also called What Went Wrong?) was not a documentary, but a fictionalised feature film about the problems facing young people in the Bougainville Province.

His 1990 film Man Without Pigs was about John Waiko (who would go on to become the PNG foreign minister from 2000 to 2001) returning to his home village to take part in a traditional ritual after receiving a PhD from the University of Papua New Guinea. The film was about the complexities of village politics, and the pressures and expectations placed on Waiko in a community where wealth and status are measured by the number of pigs one owns. The film won the awards for Best Documentary at the Hawaii International Film Festival, and the International Jurors' Prize at the Sydney Film Festival.

Bridewealth for a Goddess (2000) won the Award for Excellence at the American Anthropological Association Film and Video Festival in 2001.

Betelnut Bisnis (2004) won the award for Best Documentary at the Australian Capital Territory Film & Television Council.
