= Christian Democratic Party (Papua New Guinea) =

Political party in Papua New Guinea

- Leader: Kelly Naru
- Secretary: Korowa Pokeya
- General Secretary: Dr Banare Bun
- Founded: 1990s
- Ideology: Christian democracy
- National Parliament: 0 / 111

The Christian Democratic Party is a political party in Papua New Guinea.

It gained its first representation immediately after the 1997 election, when Puri Ruing, who had been elected for the People's Resources Awareness Party, joined the party. The party initially supported the government of Bill Skate, but later supported the government of Mekere Morauta, with Ruing made a minister in his government. Ruing defected to the People's Democratic Movement later in the term.

The party won three seats at the 2002 election: Mark Anis (Tambul-Nebilyer Open), Paul Wai (Angalimp-South Wahgi Open) and Dr Banare Bun (Henganofi Open), with Bun becoming parliamentary leader. Wai died in July 2003, and the party did not retain the seat. In October 2003, Bun criticised the National AIDS Council for using "explicit sexual language" in their information campaigns. In May 2004, amidst consternation over the role of the Papua New Guinea Party, Bun and Anis were the only recognised members of the opposition. Anis had defected to the People's Democratic Movement by the time of the 2007 election, at which Bun lost his seat.

It was revived in late 2015 after nine years of inactivity, with formerly independent Morobe Province governor Kelly Naru as leader and Bun returning as interim secretary. Bun stated that government leaders must "follow the legacy of Christ as a political principle for good governance." The party has a policy of giving "one tenth of earnings as tithes for the work of God", and pledged to campaign for a more equitable distribution of wealth.

== Election results ==
=== National elections ===
Election	Total votes	Share of vote	Seats	+/–	Government
2002			3 / 109	▲3	in opposition
2017	100,731	1.27	1 / 111	▲1	in opposition
