= 1987 Papua New Guinean general election =

- 13 June-4 July 1987
- All 109 seats in the National Parliament; 55 seats needed for a majority
Party	Leader	Vote %	Seats	+/–
Pangu Pati	Michael Somare	14.93	26	−25
PDM	Paias Wingti	10.93	17	New
National Party		4.97	12	−1
MAP	Michael Somare	5.62	7	−1
PAP	Ted Diro	3.21	6	New
PPP	Julius Chan	6.16	5	−9
Morobe	Utula Samana	2.23	4	New
LNA	John Nilkare	4.83	3	New
Papua Party	Galeva Kwarara	1.27	3	+3
United Party		3.19	1	−8
Independents	—	40.90	22	+18
This lists parties that won seats. See the complete results below.
Prime Minister before	Prime Minister after
Paias Wingti; PDM	Paias Wingti; PDM

General elections were held in Papua New Guinea between 13 June and 4 July 1987. The Pangu Party emerged as the largest party, winning 26 of the 109 seats. Voter turnout was 73.5%.

== Results ==
None of the eighteen female candidates were elected, leading to the first all-male National Parliament in Papua New Guinea's history.

Following the elections, all 22 elected independents joined parties, while two National Party MPs defected; the People's Democratic Movement (PDM) gained nine MPs, the People's Action Party eight, the People's Progress Party (PPP) five, and the Pangu Party and United Party one. The three vacant seats were later won by the National Party, PDM and PPP.

Party	Votes	%	Seats	+/–
Pangu Pati	408,082	14.93	26	–25
People's Democratic Movement	298,715	10.93	17	New
People's Progress Party	168,280	6.16	5	–9
Melanesian Alliance Party	153,611	5.62	7	–1
National Party	135,761	4.97	12	–1
League for National Advancement	132,001	4.83	3	New
People's Action Party	87,836	3.21	6	New
United Party	87,243	3.19	1	–8
Morobe Independent Group	60,922	2.23	4	New
Papua Party	34,636	1.27	3	0
Papua Besena	17,122	0.63	0	–3
Wantok Party	17,028	0.62	0	New
Country Party	10,743	0.39	0	New
Leiba Party	2,611	0.10	0	New
National Settlement Party	164	0.01	0	New
Independents	1,117,635	40.90	22	+18
Vacant			3	–
Total	2,732,390	100.00	109	0
Total votes	1,355,477	–		
Registered voters/turnout	1,843,128	73.54		
Source: Saffu, Nohlen et al.

== Aftermath ==
The newly elected Parliament met on 5 August to elect the Prime Minister. Incumbent Prime Minister Paias Wingti defeated former Prime Minister Michael Somare by a vote of 54 to 51. Wingti formed a 25-member cabinet, with Minister of Education Aruru Matiabe also serving as Acting Foreign Minister due to the previous incumbent Ted Diro being accused of corruption during an ongoing inquiry. Diro was instead appointed as a minister without portfolio.

Wingti cabinet
Position	Minister
Prime Minister	Paias Wingti
Deputy Prime Minister; Minister for Trade and Industry	Julius Chan
Minister for Administrative Services	Johnson Maladina
Minister for Agriculture and Livestock	Gai Duwabane
Minister for Civil Aviation	Hugo Berghuser
Minister for Communications	Gabriel Ramoi
Minister for Corrective Institutions	Aron Noaio
Minister for Defence	James Pokasui
Minister for Education	Aruru Matiabe
Minister for Environment and Conservation	Perry Zeipi
Minister for Finance and Planning	Galeva Kwarara
Minister for Fisheries and Marine Resources	Alan Ebu
Minister for Forests	Tom Horik
Minister for Health	Tim Ward
Minister for Home Affairs and Youth	Eserom Burege
Minister for Housing	Tom Amaiu
Minister for Justice	Albert Kipalan
Minister for Labour and Employment	Masket Iangalio
Minister for Lands and Physical Planning	Kalas Swokim
Minister for Minerals and Energy	John Kaputin
Minister for Police	Legu Vagi
Minister for Public Service	Dennis Young
Minister for Transport	Roy Yaki
Minister for Works	Aita Ivarato
Minister without Portfolio	Ted Diro
