= People's Unity Party (Papua New Guinea) =

Former political party in Papua New Guinea

The People's Unity Party was a political party in Papua New Guinea.

Prior to the 1997 election, it was a junior coalition partner in the government of Julius Chan. The party was "demolished" at that election, losing four of its five seats, including leader and Minister for Home Affairs David Unagi, deputy leader Albert Karo, and MP Reuben Parua. Karo had defected from the People's Democratic Movement in September 1995. Its sole surviving MP after the 1997 election, Alfred Kaiabe (Komo-Magarima), became leader.

Kaiabe crossed to the United Resources Party around 1999, and the party has not received media coverage since.
