= Louise Morauta =

Australian academic and public servant

Louise Morauta (née Hogg; born 1945) is an anthropologist and former public servant in Australia. For many years she taught anthropology and sociology at the University of Papua New Guinea (UPNG). She was the first wife of the former prime minister of Papua New Guinea (PNG), Mekere Morauta.

== Early life ==
Louise Morauta (née Hogg) was born in Birmingham, England. She studied at the London School of Economics, where she obtained a BA Honours degree in sociology in 1966 and a PhD in social anthropology in 1972. She carried out the fieldwork for her doctorate in the Madang Province of PNG (at that time the Territory of Papua and New Guinea) in 1968-69 and returned to the area to conduct research on the 1972 national elections, in association with UPNG.

== Career ==
Morauta taught at UPNG from 1970 to 1978. From 1978 to 1983 she was a senior research fellow at the Papua New Guinea Institute for Applied Social and Economic Research (IASER) in PNG's capital, Port Moresby. Her work there was focussed on transfers between rural and urban areas, transfers between households in a rural area of high outmigration, the emergence of permanent urban residents, and interhousehold transfers in poorer urban areas. Morauta returned in 1985 to teach at UPNG and at the end of 1986 she migrated from Papua New Guinea to Australia.

In 1987 Morauta joined the Australian Public Service in Canberra. After working in the Australian International Development Assistance Bureau (1987 - 1990) and the Department of Finance (1990 - 1994), Morauta moved to the Department of Health and Ageing. While at that department, Morauta occupied a number of first assistant secretary roles, including portfolio strategies, health benefits, health access and financing and acute care. She chaired several interdepartmental and inter-governmental committees, including the Jurisdictional Blood Committee (JBC).

In 2004 she was seconded to the Department of the Prime Minister and Cabinet to work on a health task force to examine the interface between state and federal health programs. In 2005 she moved to that department as a deputy secretary in charge of social policy, health and indigenous affairs, where she stayed until 2008. In 2008 and 2009 Morauta, then on secondment to the Department of Human Services in Victoria, was the project director for the National Registration and Accreditation Implementation Project. This project put in place the basic elements of the new national registration scheme for health practitioners, which replaced the previous state-based systems and commenced on 1 July 2010.

Following her retirement from the public service, Morauta was appointed as a lay member to the Australian Capital Territory (ACT) Human Research Ethics Committee, in January 2010. From 2014 to 2017 she was the Chair of that committee. Morauta also served as a director of the Lowitja Institute, the National Institute for Aboriginal and Torres Strait Islander Health Research from 2010 to 2013.

== Awards and honours ==
In 2005, Morauta was awarded the Australian Public Service Medal for work on Australia's health financing arrangements and the supply of blood and blood products.

== Publications ==
Morauta's publications include:

- 1974. Beyond the village: local politics in Madang, Papua-New Guinea
- 1979. Rural-urban relationships in Papua New Guinea: case material from the Gulf Province on net flows
- 1979. Facing the facts: the need for policies for permanent urban residents
- 1980. Traditional conservation in Papua New Guinea: implications for today: proceedings of a conference
- 1984. Income, unemployment, and welfare in low-income urban areas
- 1984. Left behind in the village: economic and social conditions in an area of high outmigration
- 1986. Law and order in a changing society
