= Papua Besena =

Political party in Papua New Guinea

Papua Besena (lit. Papua Tribe) was a political party in Papua New Guinea.

== History ==
The party was established in June 1973 by independent MP Josephine Abaijah. The party advocated a separate state of Papua and opposed immigration from New Guinea.

In the 1974 Port Moresby City Council elections, the party won a landslide victory, and on 16 March 1975 Abaijah declared an independent Papuan state. However, this was ignored by the government. In the 1977 general elections, the party secured six seats, winning all constituencies in Port Moresby and Central Province. When provincial elections were held in 1979, it was victorious in Central Province.

In 1980 the party joined a government coalition headed by Prime Minister Julius Chan, alongside the Melanesian Alliance Party, the National Party, the People's Progress Party and some members of the United Party.

The party was reduced to three seats in the 1982 general elections, after which it returned to opposition. In the 1987 elections, it received less than 1% of the vote and lost all three seats. It did not contest any further national elections.
