= Pan Melanesian Congress =

Papua New Guinean political party

The Pan Melanesian Congress was a political party in Papua New Guinea.

It was established in late 2001 by Karimui-Nomane MP Simeon Wai, with Wai as parliamentary leader, Privatization Commission chairman and former MP Ben Micah as party president, and future MP Nixon Duban as president of its student wing. It was immediately brought into Cabinet in advance of the 2002 election, with Wai promoted to Minister for Agriculture and Livestock by Prime Minister Mekere Morauta.

The party sought "full political, economic and social integration of the Melanesian nations by the year 2025", with a Melanesian federation along the lines of the European Union, with "a common currency, a Melanesian parliament and common policies on environment protection, resource development, foreign affairs, security and defence". It complained about a lack of visible development in Western Province and West Sepik Province. Middle Fly MP Bitan Kuok also stood for re-election in 2002 as a PMC candidate, while Micah resigned from the Privatization Commission in order to nominate as a candidate.

The party won two seats at the 2002 election: David Sui in Kandrian-Gloucester Open and Gallus Yumbui in Wosera Gawi Open. Little was reported of the party again after the post-election negotiations, and in February 2006 it was reported to have merged into People's National Congress. It still remained on the list of registered parties for the 2012 election, which it did not contest, and was formally deregistered in August 2015.
