= 1992 Papua New Guinean general election =

- 13-27 June 1992
- All of 109 seats in the National Parliament; 55 seats needed for a majority
- Turnout: 81.20%
Party	Leader	Vote %	Seats	+/–
Pangu Pati	Rabbie Namaliu	9.33	20	−6
PDM	Paias Wingti	7.83	15	−2
PAP	Ted Diro	4.67	12	+6
MAP	Bernard Narokobi	4.27	7	0
PPP	Julius Chan	2.85	8	+3
LNA	Karl Stack	2.16	4	+1
Liberal		0.95	1	New
National	Michael Mel	0.83	2	−10
BAP	Joseph Bare Onguglo	0.31	1	New
Independents	–	63.11	39	+17
This lists parties that won seats. See the complete results below.
Prime Minister before	Prime Minister after
Rabbie Namaliu; Pangu Pati	Paias Wingti; PDM

General elections were held in Papua New Guinea between 13 and 27 June 1992. The result was a victory for the Pangu Party, which won 22 of the 109 seats. Voter turnout was 81.2%.

== Results ==
Party	Votes	%	Seats	+/–
Pangu Pati	294,738	9.33	20	–6
People's Democratic Movement	247,379	7.83	15	–2
People's Action Party	147,538	4.67	12	+6
Melanesian Alliance Party	134,903	4.27	7	0
People's Solidarity Party	94,902	3.00	0	New
People's Progress Party	90,465	2.86	8	+3
League for National Advancement	68,188	2.16	4	+1
Liberal Party	29,979	0.95	1	New
National Party	26,303	0.83	2	–10
Country Party	18,646	0.59	0	0
Black Action Party	9,817	0.31	1	New
United Party	2,539	0.08	0	–1
People's Labour Party	274	0.01	0	New
Independents	1,994,132	63.11	39	+17
Total	3,159,803	100.00	109	0
Total votes	1,614,251	–		
Registered voters/turnout	1,987,994	81.20		
Source: Saffu
