= Papua and New Guinea Development Bank =

The Papua and New Guinea Development Bank (which later became the National Development Bank Limited of Papua New Guinea) commenced operations on 6 July 1967 from an office in Port Moresby. The Bank played a significant role in the economic development of the country immediately prior to and after it achieved independence on 16 September 1975.

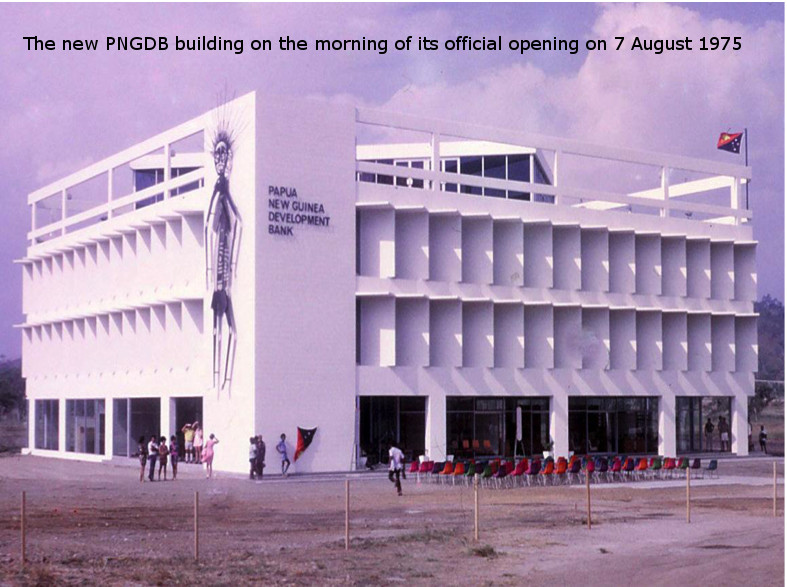
The new PNGDB headquarters on the morning of its official opening on 7 August 1975 in Waigani, Papua New Guinea

== Background ==
The Papua and New Guinea Development Bank was established by the Australian Government as administrator of the Territory of Papua and New Guinea following a report that the Australian Government had sought in 1964 from the International Bank for Reconstruction and Development (IBRD, commonly known as the World Bank). That request was for a report to make “recommendations to assist it in planning a development programme for the Territory of Papua and New Guinea designed to stimulate economic growth and to raise the standard of living of the people”.

Under the Papua and New Guinea Development Bank Ordinance of 1965, the functions of the Bank were set out as being:

1. to provide finance for persons for the purposes of primary production, or for the establishment or development of institutions or commercial undertakings, particularly small undertakings;
2. to provide advice and assistance with a view to promoting the efficient organisation and conduct of primary production or of industrial or commercial undertakings.

The Bank's enabling legislation charged the Board's duty as "within the limits of its powers, to ensure that the policy of the Bank is directed to the greatest advantage of the people of the Territory and have due regard to the stability and balanced development of the Territory economy and the advancement of the indigenous people". By 1968 the Australian Government had provided $7 million to the development bank.

== Lending role ==
The bank was the country's main source of soft loans for farmers and small rural projects. There were many issues facing the new Development Bank. The majority of residents were subsistence farmers with only limited involvement in the cash economy. They lacked the experience and available collateral to be eligible for normal trading bank assistance. The Papua and New Guinea Development Bank was able to lend widely where "specialised" support was provided by the Bank's staff and agents. This was known as "supervised credit".

The agents comprised extension officers ("Didimen") from the Department of Agriculture, Stock and Fisheries (DASF), Business Advisory Officers and Co-operatives Officers from the Department of Trade and Industry (DTI) and officers in charge of the Department of District Administration (DDA) stations.

By the end of August 1969, the Bank had created regional offices in Lae to service the New Guinea mainland, in Rabaul to service the New Guinea islands and in Mt Hagen to cover the Highlands region. Within just over one year, Representative offices were established in ten District (later Provincial) centres. As business expanded, most of these offices were upgraded while offices were opened in other larger towns to expand the services available to communities in rural areas.

The Papua and New Guinea Development Bank was quick to begin providing funding for business projects through its network of agents located throughout the country, approving 500 loans totalling A$3,750,796 by 30 June 1968. Of these loans, 422 were to Indigenous people. A small percentage of loans was made to expatriates in order to provide employment and skills opportunities for indigenous people in businesses that also facilitated provision of a range of support services critical to the success of the large number of locally (indigenous) owned operations.

In pursuit of its prime objective of promoting social and economic progress, the Bank approved loans totalling K72 million to almost 17,000 borrowers in the first ten years of operation.

Loans were provided for a range of industries including:

- Rural: cocoa, coconuts (for copra), rubber, tea, palm oil, sweet potato (kaukau) and other vegetables, rice, beef cattle, pigs, poultry, fishing including aquaculture, cultured pearls.
- Commercial: trade stores, transport – work boats, coastal shipping, dinghies and outboard motors, trucks, light trucks (including 4WD vehicles), taxis, coffee processing, tourism enterprises.
- Industrial: manufacturing (including textiles and footwear), food processing, palm oil processing.

Potential borrowers were required to demonstrate that they had the capacity to complete and successfully manage their project. The approval of funding was conditional on this prerequisite. With some projects, applicants were required to make a physical contribution towards the project prior to a Bank loan being approved. As an example, those wishing to extend plantings of coconuts, cocoa or rubber were limited to finance for the development of an area up to 4.5 times that developed prior to Bank financial support being authorised. In the case of cattle projects, intending borrowers were required to cut and prepare timber for yards and fencing up to the stage when wire could be strung. This personal commitment to the project by the intending developer came to be referred to as 'sweat equity'. In the case of other projects, such as vehicles, boats, equipment or commercial enterprises, clients were required make a contribution in cash.

The Bank funded smallholder land settlement schemes throughout the country, such as rubber plantations in Papua, the oil palm industry in West New Britain and cocoa farmers in East New Britain. The land occupied by these schemes was leasehold land so a mortgage could be taken over the land to secure the lending. However, the vast majority of land in Papua New Guinea was termed “clan land” with ownership being under the local Indigenous tribe or group. To ensure that borrowers for rural projects had approval from their clan or tribe to utilise a block of land for the proposed business, be it growing coconuts or cocoa or grazing cattle or pigs on it, the Bank developed and used a Clan Land Usage Agreement which required the tribal or village leaders to formally agree that the proposed borrower had the group's approval to use the land for that business.

== Staffing arrangements ==
The Papua and New Guinea Development Bank was led by experienced trading or development bankers from Australia and New Zealand with an emphasis placed on their ability to train local Indigenous staff in all facets of the operations so those local staff could take on senior roles as they gained knowledge and experience. The Bank supported the Papua New Guinea Bankers’ College and in addition provided scholarships and other support to local staff to enable them to gain qualifications from Papua New Guinea tertiary educational institutions as well as overseas institutions. All but two of the District Representative positions had been “localised” (with an Indigenous officer appointed to the position) by late 1972. The Banks’ first Indigenous Branch Manager Mr Egi Trudi was appointed to Popondetta Branch in 1974. Mr Masket Iangalio became the Bank's first Indigenous (local) Managing Director in 1976. By that time, other Indigenous staff filled managerial positions in the organisation such as Manager of the Administration Section and as the Bank's Economist.

== Innovative Development Programme ==
Under the Papua New Guinea Development Bank Ordinance of 1965 in addition to normal banking roles, the management ensured that the organisation employed experienced and specialised staff who were able to offer technical expertise and support to would-be entrepreneurs in the country to enable them to contribute to the country's economic development. The Bank introduced innovative programs to develop business leaders such as trade store owners who could compete with established operators. The Bank also instigated initiatives to establish businesses to provide services not otherwise available in the community that could be sold on to suitable entrepreneurs once operating viably. By mid 1970 the bank had outstanding loans of $7.4 million. As the principal agent for the share issue offered to Papua New Guineans by Bougainville Copper Limited in late 1971, the Bank was instrumental in enabling a large number of the Indigenous population to become shareholders of this public company and thus participate actively in the country's economic development. The Bank contributed to Papua New Guinea's economic development by working closely with the Village Economic Development Fund in funding projects which would lead to an increase in Indigenous participation in the economy in the mid-1970s, including in the funding of the purchase by Indigenous groups of expatriate-owned businesses, such as viable coffee, cocoa, coconut and rubber plantations. By 1975 the percentage of funds loaned to indigenous people had risen to 44% of the total.

From soon after commencing operations, the Bank took up minority shareholdings in profitable business developments as and when these were on offer with a view to ensuring national ownership interests were retained and, possibly, could be made available to trade on a National Stock Exchange if/when it was established. Ultimately, these investments were on-sold to the Papua New Guinea Investment Corporation when that statutory body came into being in 1971. The banks assets had grown to K100 million by 1988.

== Governance ==
When Papua New Guinea achieved self-government in 1973, the Bank's name was amended to the Papua New Guinea Development Bank to accord with the country's new name (deleting the “and”). In 1984, the name of the Bank was changed to The Agricultural Bank of Papua New Guinea. At this time, the Bank's commercial and industrial lending was transferred across to the Government-owned Papua New Guinea Banking Corporation. The Agricultural Bank was renamed the Rural Development Bank of Papua New Guinea in 1994 following Asian Development Bank intervention, which continued through 1996. After being renamed, the bank focused on rural loans only, with a preference for small and medium-sized operations. The bank was insolvent in 2004, resulting in a new board being appointed and a subsequent recovery plan was successful. As a result of new legislation passed through the Papua New Guinea Parliament on 25 April 2007, the National Development Bank Limited of Papua New Guinea, a wholly owned subsidiary of the Independent Public Business Corporation, was established and took over the role and the lending of the Rural Development Bank of Papua New Guinea in 2007. In June 2007 the prime minister launched the National Development Bank in Madang.
