= 2002 Papua New Guinean general election =

- 15–29 June 2002
Party	Leader	Vote %	Seats	+/–
PDM	Mekere Morauta	10.73	12	+4
NAP	Michael Somare	6.85	19	+13
PPP	Michael Nali	5.55	8	−8
National Party		4.24	3	+2
PLP	Peter Yama	4.08	4	New
Pangu Pati	Chris Haiveta	3.79	6	−7
PAP		3.55	5	+1
Revival Party	John Pundari	2.31	1	New
United Party	Bire Kimisopa	2.01	3	+3
PNC	Bill Skate	1.41	2	New
Country Party		1.39	1	+1
CDP	Banare Bun	1.36	3	New
NVFP		1.33	1	New
PFP	Luther Wenge	1.30	2	New
PMC	Simeon Wai	1.29	2	New
NTP	Francis Apurel	1.26	2	New
PNG Labour Party	John Paska	1.24	1	New
Advance PNG		1.22	1	New
PSP		1.13	2	+1
MAP	Bernard Narokobi	0.67	3	−2
Rural Pipol's Pati	Peter Namus	0.47	2	New
One People Party		0.44	1	New
URP	Anderson Agiru	0.43	1	New
PNG First Party		0.36	1	+1
Independents	—	32.33	17	−19
This lists parties that won seats. See the complete results below.
Prime Minister before	Prime Minister after
Mekere Morauta; PDM	Michael Somare; NAP

General elections were held in Papua New Guinea between 15 and 29 June 2002. Michael Somare's National Alliance Party won the most seats and he went on to become Prime Minister.

The elections had electoral violence, as well as allegations of vote-rigging and destruction of ballot boxes.

== Results ==
Party	Votes	%	Seats
People's Democratic Movement	639,877	10.73	12
National Alliance Party	408,658	6.85	19
People's Progress Party	330,921	5.55	8
National Party	252,652	4.24	3
People's Labour Party	243,509	4.08	4
Pangu Pati	225,787	3.79	6
People's Action Party	211,567	3.55	5
Papua New Guinea Revival Party	137,872	2.31	1
United Party	119,607	2.01	3
People's National Congress	84,041	1.41	2
PNG Country Party	82,855	1.39	1
Christian Democratic Party	80,951	1.36	3
National Vision for Humanity Party	79,444	1.33	1
People's First Party	77,475	1.30	2
Pan Melanesian Congress Party	76,748	1.29	2
Nation Transformation Party	75,332	1.26	2
PNG Labour Party	74,074	1.24	1
Advance PNG Party	72,549	1.22	1
Melanesian People's Party	72,422	1.21	0
Party for Justice and Dignity	72,341	1.21	0
People's Solidarity Party	67,612	1.13	2
True Peoples Party	62,106	1.04	0
National Front Party	55,506	0.93	0
Melanesian Alliance Party	39,815	0.67	3
People's Heritage Party	39,145	0.66	0
People's Freedom Party	37,175	0.62	0
Melanesian Labour Party	32,683	0.55	0
Rural Pipol's Pati	28,048	0.47	2
One People Party	26,203	0.44	1
United Resources Party	25,793	0.43	1
People's Destiny & Development Party	25,142	0.42	0
People's Development Party	25,037	0.42	0
PNG First Party	21,270	0.36	1
PNG Greens Party	20,756	0.35	0
Yumi Reform Party	19,875	0.33	0
Economic Endeavour Party	19,162	0.32	0
Simple Peoples Party	15,938	0.27	0
People's Welfare Party	15,599	0.26	0
PNG Integrity Party	11,872	0.20	0
Liberal Party	8,347	0.14	0
People's First Conservative Party	8,053	0.14	0
Human Rights Protection Party	6,448	0.11	0
People's Resources Awareness Party	4,867	0.08	0
Independent	1,927,941	32.33	17
Vacant			6
Total	5,963,075	100.00	109
Valid votes	5,963,075	99.46	
Invalid/blank votes	32,153	0.54	
Total votes	5,995,228	100.00	
Source: Wood
