= Kerenga Kua =

Papua New Guinean politician

The Honourable Kerenga Kua CBG LLB MP
- Kua serving as Attorney General in 2014

Personal details
- Born: 1963 (age 62–63) Kundiawa, Chimbu, Papua New Guinea
- Party: National Party

Kerenga Kambriyupo Kua CMG LLB MP (born 1963) is a Papua New Guinean lawyer and politician who has served as the Member of Parliament for Sinasina-Yongamugl since 2012.

== Personal life ==
Kua was born at the Enga Lutheran Mission Station in Kundiawa, Chimbu in 1963. He studied at the University of Papua New Guinea from 1982.

In June 2023, Kua was awarded the Order of St Michael and St George (CMG) by King Charles III for his 2023 birthday honours.

== Early career ==
Kua achieved a law degree from the University of Papua New Guinea and served as president of the Papua New Guinea Law Society for five consecutive terms. He was a senior managing partner of Posman Kua Aisi Lawyers, having worked in law for 24 years. In December 2011, he announced his intention to run for parliament.

== Political career ==
=== Cabinet minister ===
Kua ran for the seat of Sinasina-Yongamugl in the 2012 Papua New Guinean general election. The Electoral Commission listed Kua as an independent, but he had been endorsed by the National Alliance Party, who had led the Fourth Somare cabinet from 2007 to 2011. He was elected with 25.3% of the vote.

Following the election, he was appointed to the role of Minister for Justice and Attorney General in the O'Neill-Dion cabinet from August 2012 until June 2014.

=== Leader of the National Party ===
==== Opposition (2016–2019) ====
On 13 April 2016, Kua left the government to join the opposition. He believed the government was neglecting and suppressing the systems of holding the government to account, and expressed that the government was failing on the national issues.

He decided to join the National Party and was praised by party president David Yak, who alongside party executives agreed to make Kua party leader. Yak said, "Mr. Kua has made a very tough and wise decision to captain this shop... into the rough seas ahead."

At the 2017 Papua New Guinean general election, the National Party received 186,279 votes (2.36%) and 3 seats. Kua increased his vote share to 44.8% in this election, winning re-election.

Kua refused to serve under Peter O'Neill, participating an attempt to force no confidence in the government in January 2019. He said, "Major crimes are going unpunished because those crimes are committed by those people who prop up O'Neill as the prime minister." During his time in opposition, he served in the shadow cabinet of Patrick Pruaitch from 2017 to 2019.

==== Government (2019–2024) ====
James Marape became prime minister in May 2019, and Kua decided to return to government and was appointed as Minister of Petroleum and Energy.

At the 2022 Papua New Guinean general election, the National Party received 1 seat, down two from the previous election. The vote share of Kua in his own constituency fell to 31.7% this time around. Kua was re-appointed as Minister of Petroleum and Energy, one of three opposition MPs to join the government. Kua later said, "That is unprecedented, I think... I felt duty-bound to go beyond the call of duty to do more than any other minister to reforming the petroleum industry. And that is what I did."

On 26 January 2024, Kua resigned from the government after five years. He opted to resign due to the splitting of his ministry, having been offered just the position of Minister of Petroleum. He issued several other reasons for his departure, including cronyism and threats to projects in the hydrocarbon industry.

==== Opposition (2024–present) ====
Since May 2024, Kua has served in the Tomuriesa shadow cabinet with the portfolios of Petroleum and Energy, and International Trade and Investment.
