= National Front Party (Papua New Guinea) =

Political party in Papua New Guinea

The National Front Party was a political party in Papua New Guinea.

The party was established in 2002 by Kundiawa-Gembogl MP and former Minister for Defence Peter Waieng. Waieng subsequently resigned his seat due to pending misconduct proceedings against him, but contested and lost the seat at the election. The party won no other seats.

The party endorsed one candidate at the 2007 election, and won no seats. At the time of the 2012 election, the party was led by Philip Kende.

It was deregistered in 2015.
