= Kingdom First Party =

Political party in Papua New Guinea

The Kingdom First Party was a political party in Papua New Guinea, led by John Kuimb. At the time of the 2012 parliamentary election its president was Danny Puli, general secretary Jacob Sanga Kumbu and treasurer Lorraine Kumbu. The party fielded five candidates, but none was elected. It was deregistered in 2015.
