= Anthony Siaguru =

Papua New Guinea public servant and anti-corruption campaigner

Sir Anthony Siaguru KBE

Deputy Secretary-General for Political Affairs for the Commonwealth
- In office 1990–1995
- Preceded by: Chief Emeka Anyaoku

Minister for Youth and Development, Papua New Guinea
- In office 1985–1985

Minister for The Public Service, Papua New Guinea
- In office 1982–1984

Secretary for Foreign Affairs and Trade, Papua New Guinea
- In office 1975–1982

Personal details
- Born: 4 November 1946 East Sepik Province, Territory of Papua and New Guinea (now Papua New Guinea)
- Died: 16 April 2004 (aged 57)
- Spouse: Wilhemina Siaguru (m. 1972)
- Children: 3

Sir Anthony Siaguru KBE (4 November 1946 – 16 April 2004) was a Papua New Guinean civil servant, lawyer, international diplomat, politician, sportsman and anti-corruption campaigner.

== Early life and education ==
Anthony Siaguru was born on 4 November 1946 in the East Sepik Province of what is now Papua New Guinea (PNG). After school in Wewak, capital of East Sepik Province, he studied at Marist College Ashgrove, a Roman Catholic day and boarding primary and secondary school for boys, located in the northern Brisbane suburb of Ashgrove, in Queensland, Australia. In 1971, he was among the first graduates in law from the University of Papua New Guinea. In 1972, he was attached to the Australian Foreign Service and spent a brief period at the Australian mission in Geneva. There were further studies from 1980, at the Harvard Institute for International Development at Harvard University in the United States, as an Edward S. Mason Fellow, with the benefit of a Fulbright Scholarship. Learning rugby union in Australia, Siaguru became captain and, later, coach, of the Papua New Guinea national rugby union team.

== Career ==
Papua New Guinea became independent in late 1975. At the time Siaguru graduated, there was a strong demand for graduates who could play leading roles in the public service, as these positions were mainly occupied by Australians. By the time of independence, Siaguru had become the first Secretary for Foreign Affairs and Trade. In this position he played a significant role in negotiations between Pacific Island countries and Australia and New Zealand, leading ultimately to the establishment of the South Pacific Regional Trade and Economic Co-operation Agreement (SPARTECA) in 1981, which allowed smaller South Pacific Island countries tariff-free access for many of their exports into Australian and NZ markets. He negotiated PNG's associate membership of the European Union under the Lomé Agreement, as well as the Torres Strait Treaty with Australia and a border agreement with Indonesia. Siaguru played a major role in shaping PNG's foreign policy of "Friends to All, Enemies to None" and in persuading the prime minister, Michael Somare, to give diplomatic recognition to China.

Together with Mekere Morauta in the Ministry of Finance, Rabbie Namaliu in the Public Service Commission, and Charles Lepani of the National Planning Office, Siaguru became one of the so-called "Gang of Four" young Papua New Guinean senior public servants who coordinated policy development and government programmes.

Siaguru helped organise the 1982 election campaign for the Pangu Pati, which was led by Michael Somare. In a country where there are numerous political parties, requiring problematic coalitions, the Pangu Pati victory in 1982 was the most successful result for a single party in PNG's history. Siaguru was elected to parliament in that year, winning a seat in Port Moresby, and becoming the minister for the public service in 1982–84 and the minister for youth and development in 1985. Following a split in the party, however, Siaguru joined together with John Nilkare and Sir Barry Holloway to form a new party, the League for National Advancement (LNA), but Siaguru was not re-elected in 1987, although the party gained seats in 1987 and again in 1992. In 1987 he joined the international law company, Blake Dawson Waldron. In February 1990, Siaguru became deputy secretary-general for political affairs at the Commonwealth Secretariat in London, serving for five years. Among his roles was to support the transition process from apartheid in South Africa, leading up to the 1994 election when the African National Congress, led by Nelson Mandela achieved a majority.

Siaguru returned to PNG in 1996 and went back to working with Blake Dawson Waldron. He became a pioneering leader in the country's civil society. He was much in demand as a board member of private companies and was the founding chairman of the Port Moresby Stock Exchange; chairman of Pacific Reinsurance; deputy chairman of Lihir Gold, which provided a successful model for establishing community relations with extraction industries; a director of Steamships Trading Company; chairman of the oil palm producer Pacific Rim Plantations; chairman of PNG Water; chairman of an investment fund; and a director of the Papua New Guinea Post-Courier. He represented PNG on the Asia-Pacific Economic Cooperation Business Advisory Council and was a member of the Policy Advisory Council of the Australian Centre for International Agricultural Research (ACIAR). For the Post-Courier, he wrote a weekly column called In House, in which he condemned corruption in PNG, and made proposals for constitutional reform, in part to address the numerous political parties in the country. His writings were later published as a book, called In House in Papua New Guinea with Anthony Siaguru.

Reflecting his concerns about corruption in the country, Siaguru became the founding chairman of the PNG chapter of Transparency International. He launched the Integrity Pact at the time of the 1997 national elections, requiring politicians to sign a Charter committing themselves to transparent governance.

== Death ==
Siaguru died of 16 April 2004 in Brisbane, while undergoing treatment for liver cancer. He was survived by his wife, Wilhelmina (Mina), who served for many years as Chairperson of PNG's Commission for Higher Education, whom he married in 1972, and three sons.

== Awards and posthumous recognition ==
- Siaguru was appointed as a Knight Commander of the Order of the British Empire in 1990.
- In 2004, the Post-Courier newspaper announced that it was instituting an annual "Sir Anthony Siaguru Investigative Journalism Scholarship" for one of its journalist interns to go to Australia to work with investigative journalists at one of Australia's leading newspapers.
- Transparency International established a fund known as the Siaguru Endowment Fund, to give the Port Moresby office an ongoing capacity to continue the anti-corruption work of Siaguru.
- An annual "Sir Anthony Siaguru Walk against Corruption" is held in Port Moresby.
