= Papua New Guinea Revival Party =

Political party in Papua New Guinea

The Papua New Guinea Revival Party was a political party in Papua New Guinea from 2002 to 2003.

It was founded in January 2002 by John Pundari upon his resignation from the governing People's Democratic Movement following his sacking as foreign minister. Pundari contested and lost the Enga Provincial seat at the 2002 election, but new candidate Roy Biyama won in Middle Fly Open.

Biyama had defected to the People's Action Party by mid-2003. The party was deregistered in 2003.
