= Rural Pipol's Pati =

Political party in Papua New Guinea

The Rural Pipol's Pati was a political party in Papua New Guinea.

It was launched in March 2002, in advance of the 2002 election. Headed by Peter Namus, it sought to "correct the imbalance in the distribution of funds and resources" between rural and urban areas, arguing that it was unfair that so much development was concentrated in urban areas when both the bulk of people and resources were in rural areas. The party also pledged to start electoral development authorities and cooperative societies to assist in small and medium business development. By May, Menyamya MP Thomas Pelika had signed up to lead the party into the election.

The party won two seats at the election: Fabian Inne in Goilala Open and Martin Tabi in North Fly Open. Both MPs later defected to other parties, and little was heard of the party again.
