= Nation Transformation Party =

Political party in Papua New Guinea

The Nation Transformation Party (NTP) was a political party in Papua New Guinea.

It was established for the 2002 election by pastor Francis Apurel, who ran for the Southern Highlands Provincial seat vacated by dismissed Governor Anderson Agiru. The party repeatedly referred to the United Resources Party as their "sister party". It won two seats at the election: David Anggo in Chuave Open and Kimson Kare in Wewak Open.

The party soon dissipated, with Anggo identified as an independent by December that year and Kare drifting to the People's National Congress. It was reported in February 2006 to have merged into the People's National Congress.
