= New Generation Party (Papua New Guinea) =

Papua New Guinean political party

- Leader: Bire Kimisopa
- President: George Leahy
- Secretary: Quentan Cholai
- Founder: Bart Philemon
- Founded: 2006
- National Parliament: 1 / 118

The New Generation Party is a political party in Papua New Guinea.

It was established in 2006 by former Treasurer Bart Philemon and Lae businessman Bob Sinclair. It pledged to abolish provincial governments and administrators and ban the export of whole logs, switching to downstream processing of timber in Papua New Guinea. It stated that it would not work with the government of Michael Somare, and allied with Mekere Morauta's Papua New Guinea Party. It won four seats at the 2007 election, with Philemon becoming deputy opposition leader under Morauta.

The party passed into government when Peter O'Neill ousted Somare in August 2011, and O'Neill appointed Philemon as Minister for Public Service in the new government. During the campaign for the 2012 election, Philemon argued that former Prime Ministers Julius Chan, Paias Wingti and Michael Somare should retire to allow for younger leadership. The election saw the party return three MPs: Dr William Tongamp (Jiwaka Provincial), Bire Kimisopa (Goroka Open) and Ronny Knight (Manus Open), but saw Philemon lose his seat to Loujaya Toni. Asked about the party's future at the time of his concession, Philemon stated he had "not given any thought to it at this stage".

The party initially elected Ronny Knight as their second leader after Philemon's defeat, but by 2016 Bire Kimisopa had assumed the leadership. The party crossed to the opposition in July 2016 and supported a no-confidence vote against Prime Minister O'Neill.
