= PNG Labour Party =

Political party in Papua New Guinea

- Founded: 2001
- Dissolved: 2012 (est.)
- Ideology: Social Democracy

The Papua New Guinea Labour Party was a political party in Papua New Guinea.

It was launched in 2001 by the PNG Trade Union Congress, with Andrew Kandakasi as party president. In February 2002, Australian Labor Party president Greg Sword visited Port Moresby to support the party. PNGTUC secretary-general John Paska became the party leader for the 2002 election. Paska was unsuccessful, but Dr Bob Danaya was elected in Western Provincial. Danaya then supported Michael Somare for Prime Minister.

Danaya was re-elected as the party's sole MP in the 2007 election. Danaya lost his seat to Ati Wobiro in the 2012 election.

The party did not contest the 2017 election and as of 2018 was no longer registered.
