= Bire Kimisopa =

Bire Kimisopa (born 22 December 1962) is a Papua New Guinean politician. He was a member of the National Parliament of Papua New Guinea from 2002 to 2007 and from 2012 to 2017, both times representing the seat of Goroka Open. He was Minister for Internal Security (2003–2006) and Minister for Justice (2006–2007) in Michael Somare's third government. He was the leader of the United Party from 2002 to 2007 and leader of the New Generation Party from 2016 to 2017.

== Early life and election to parliament ==
Kimisopa was educated at the Papua New Guinea University of Technology and the University of New England in Australia, and was an accountant before entering politics. He was elected to the National Parliament for the United Party at the 2002 election, and was immediately appointed party leader following the defeat of his predecessor at the election. In his first months in office, he called for a budget honesty and integrity bill to prevent over-expenditure for political reasons and called for a hold to be placed on appointments to statutory bodies after a number of appointments he viewed as political in nature.

== Minister for Internal Security ==
In August 2003, he was promoted to Minister for Internal Security in the Somare government. He pledged to clean up the national Department of Immigration, claiming that some government officers were taking bribes to "turn a blind eye" to human-smuggling and gun-running, called for proper post-mortems to determine causes of death and prevent revenge killings for perceived "sorcery" and pledged to ban MPs from using police officers as private bodyguards. He proposed to change the constitution to allow Papua New Guinean police to deploy overseas on regional assistance missions, which would be supported by the parliament in January 2004. He also proposed introducing curfews on major highways and extending the term of the police commissioner to reduce political influence.

In early October, he declared the police force was in "crisis" due to poor discipline, political interference, low wages and poor housing, and called for increased funding, the recruitment of 2,000 more officers, and a one-off aid assistance package from Australia to remedy a series of issues. He initiated a review committee to identify problems that could be tackled within the police force, and lamented that while low wages were causing major problems, the government could not afford a salary increase. In November, he announced that there would be no police recruitment in 2004 due to a lack of funds; however, following the December announcement of an Australian aid package, he announced that 400 officers could now be recruited.

The proposed Australian assistance package also involved the deployment of 300 Australian officers, which saw Kimisopa involved with the passage of legislation surrounding the powers and liabilities of the officers, as well as defending them from claims that the deployment breached the country's sovereignty. He was subjected to particular criticism from some MPs for the proposed immunity for the Australian police. In March 2004, he was involved in the deployment of Papua New Guinean police to the Solomon Islands, following the January passage of enabling legislation. Domestically, he continued attempts to limit the supply of firearms and ammunition within Papua New Guinea, ultimately proposing a total ban on the sale of guns. In September 2004, he called for new legislation to crack down on illegal immigration to Papua New Guinea.

In late 2004, Kimisopa clashed with his own government over police funding, submitting a request for a 10-million-kina increase and lashing out at a budget that delivered a 10% cut in funding for 2005. He also repeatedly advocated for mandatory funding of police by provincial and local governments from their own budgets. His advocacy was successful, and in October won executive approval for a one-off 10% pay rise for police. In the same month, he announced that women would form half of the next intake of police recruits in an attempt to improve gender parity in the police force. In November 2004, he initiated a bill to regulate the security industry in Papua New Guinea, which was passed unanimously by parliament, successfully separated the pay structure for police from the other uniformed forces, permitting the police union to negotiate their own pay, and won executive support for the establishment of a gun control committee headed by former PNGDF commander Jerry Singirok.

In December 2004, as Australian police finally prepared to arrive in Papua New Guinea, Kimisopa argued that the five-year timeframe of the program should be doubled. He continued to be outspoken about the poor state of the police, declaring that corruption went "right to the top" and that "Chinese mafia have bought off officials throughout the system...they are siphoning money out, corrupting Government officials, colluding with police and making attempts to kill officials as well." In February 2005, he called for an amnesty for corrupt police who admitted wrongdoing and promised to reform, and suggested introducing a standing Police Complaints Tribunal if the situation did not improve. He also announced an urgent review of firearms legislation in Papua New Guinea in his ongoing campaign against illegal weapons. He also faced ongoing opposition to the Australian police deployment, with the Police Association of Papua New Guinea calling for their removal and one-time ally Luther Wenge launching a court challenge to the program.

The Supreme Court ruled that the enabling legislation for the Australian deployment was unconstitutional in May 2005, forcing Kimisopa to concede that the Australian police would have to leave the country. He labelled the ruling "devastating", declaring that the Australian assistance was vital for planned reforms to the police and suggesting a solution be found to "resuscitate" it. He flew to Canberra later that month for negotiations with Australian officials, but faced problems around the issue of immunity for the Australian police. In July 2005, a long-planned gun summit was held in Goroka to finalise a report on addressing illegal firearms, resulting in wide praise for Kimisopa's efforts on the issue. In late August he faced the international media over a Human Rights Watch report about police abuses against children in Papua New Guinea, declaring that it was "something we cannot hide from" and again emphasising the need to reform in concert with Australian assistance. In September, a revised agreement was agreed with the Australian government, which Kimisopa criticised for its more limited role for Australian police and lower levels of financial assistance.

== Minister for Justice and 2007 defeat ==
In April 2006, Kimisopa was shifted from the internal security portfolio to the role of Minister for Justice. He announced his opposition to the death penalty in his new role, declaring "killing Papua New Guineans is out of my calendar" and expressing concern about the state of forensic facilities in death penalty cases. He split with his government over the Julian Moti extradition, declaring that "the law should take its course and diplomatic sensitivities should not override that", in contrast to Prime Minister Somare's staunch opposition, and stating that Moti's escape from Papua New Guinea "compromises the integrity of this nation" He suggested that if the government of the Solomon Islands were found to have been involved in the escape, that Papua New Guinea would "now critically have to assess our relationship in terms of the bilateral relationship we have with the Solomon Islands". In November, it was reported that Kimisopa may be sacked as Minister for Justice over his position on the Moti affair; however, this did not occur.

A pre-election poll by a Port Moresby firm in April 2007 found Kimisopa was seen as the best performing minister in the government. However, Kimisopa lost his seat to Pangu Party candidate Thomson Harokaqveh at the 2007 election. He was succeeded as leader of the United Party by Bob Dadae. Following his defeat, Kimisopa served as director of the Goroka Preparatory School, and continued to be involved in justice-related issues as a member of the Community Coalition Against Corruption.

== Return to parliament ==
Kimisopa was re-elected to his old seat at the 2012 election, alternatively described as either an independent or a New Generation Party candidate, defeating Harokaqveh. He was appointed chairman of the Public Sector Reform Special Committee and as a member of the Communications Referral Committee in his second term. He attacked Prime Minister Peter O'Neill over corruption issues in early August following his re-election, to which his New Generation Party, a member of O'Neill's coalition, distanced themselves. He opposed National Capital District Governor Powes Parkop's "buai ban", suggesting Parkop have compassion for Central Province growers who relied on betel nuts for economic sustenance. In May 2015, he spoke out about the dire state of medical facilities in Mabudawan in Western Province, declaring that he "broke down in tears" in response to what he witnessed on a fact-finding trip, and raised concerns about the impact of severe underfunding on an outbreak of drug-resistant tuberculosis in the province.

In September 2015, Kimisopa sharply criticised the Australian government over high visa fees "only on Papua New Guinea citizens", declaring them "blatantly discriminatory". In June 2016, he broke with protocol to publicly release two damning reports on public health management before they had been tabled in parliament, citing "the national tuberculosis health emergency" and stating "we simply cannot wait forever to take strong and decisive action on health management...the health system is in disarray and incapable of meeting public expectations." He noted the government's refusal to table other critical reports placed on the parliamentary notice paper as justification. He succeeded William Tongamp as leader of the New Generation Party in mid-2016.

Kimisopa lost his seat to Henry Ame at the 2017 election.

National Parliament of Papua New Guinea
Preceded by Henry Smith	Member for Goroka Open; 2002–2007	Succeeded by Thompson Harokaqveh
Preceded by Thompson Harokaqveh	Member for Goroka Open; 2012–present	Succeeded by Henry Ame
Party political offices
Preceded by Gabia Gagarimabu	Leader of the United Party; 2002–2007	Succeeded by Bob Dadae
Preceded by William Tongamp	Leader of the New Generation Party; 2016–present	Incumbent
