= Michael Nali =

Papua New Guinean politician

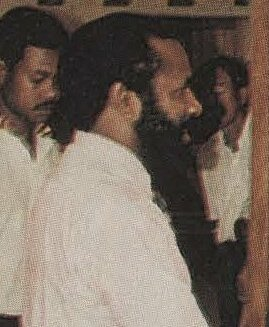
Micheal Nali in 1997

Michael Buku Nali, CMG, CBE (born 1961) is a Papua New Guinean politician. He was the leader of the People's Progress Party from 2002 to 2007 and was Member of Parliament for the electorate of Mendi Open, in Southern Highlands Province, from 1992 until 2007. During this period he held various ministerial positions, including Deputy Prime Minister and Minister for Trade and Industry. At the 2007 general election he chose to contest the Southern Highlands Provincial electorate, which was won by Anderson Agiru.

He was appointed Commander of the Order of the British Empire (CBE) in the 2008 Birthday Honours.

He was also appointed a Companion of the Order of St Michael and St George (CMG) in 2018 Birthday Honours.

== Footnotes ==
Political offices
Preceded by Chris Haiveta	Deputy Prime Minister of Papua New Guinea; 1997–1998	Succeeded by Iairo Lasaro
National Parliament of Papua New Guinea
Preceded by William Ank	Member for Mendi Open; 1992–2007	Succeeded by Isaac Joseph
