= Bernard Narokobi =

Papua New Guinean politician, jurist, and philosopher

Nakarobi in 1999

Bernard Mullu Narokobi OBE (1943 – March 2010) was a Papua New Guinean politician, jurist, and philosopher. He was serving as the Papua New Guinean High Commissioner to New Zealand prior to his death. Between 1987 and 1997 he represented his Wewak Open Electorate as a Member in the Papua New Guinea's National Parliament. During his time as a Member of Parliament (MP), he served as the Minister of Justice of Papua New Guinea (1988–1992) in the government led by the then Prime Minister Rabbie Namaliu; Agriculture Minister (1992–1994) under the leadership of Prime Minister Sir Julius Chan led government; and Leader of the Opposition from July 1997 to 1999, and Speaker of the National Parliament of Papua New Guinea, until he lost his seat to the then Wewak MP Kimson Kare during the 2002 elections. He was displaced as a minister in the Chan government for failing to vote in favour of constitutional reforms in the provincial system of government.

In April 2009, The Guardian described him as one of Papua New Guinea's "living national icons", along with Michael Somare and Mal Michael.

== Background and family life ==
Narokobi was born around 1943 in Wautogik village, East Sepik Province, Papua New Guinea, to his father Anton (Kukum) Narokobi and mother Maria Mokoi and was the second eldest of five siblings. His siblings were Veronica, Apolonia, Caroline and Camillus. Camillus his younger and only brother is intending to stand for the Wewak Open seat. Camillus is also a lawyer in his own right at the family law firm, Narokobi Lawyers. Narokobi's father Anton was taught by pioneer Catholic missionaries and became one of the early catechists who served the people of Boiken and Dagua villages through teaching the Catholic faith. Narokobi was a widower, having lost his wife Regina to breast cancer in 2007. He had 7 children: Vergil, Daniel, Anna, Justina, Ottonia, Benedine and Regina (twins). His son Vergil is also a lawyer and after completing a bachelor's degree in law with honours at the University of Papua New Guinea, he went on to do his Masters in law at Cambridge University. His daughter Anna has also recently completed her degree in law in Australia.

Few paper records exist of Narokobi's early life, but it appears that he started primary education at around the age of ten or twelve, roughly around 1952. He began school at the Dagua Catholic Mission and then attended Brandi High School in Wewak, East Sepik Province. In 1959 he was taught by Michael Somare who later became the first Prime Minister of Papua New Guinea. From Brandi High School he went on to matriculate at the then Kerevat National High School in East New Britain Province, where he met another future Prime Minister of Papua New Guinea, Rabbie Namaliu. In 1966 Narokobi went off to Australia where he undertook a degree in law at the University of Sydney, where he received an LLB in 1972. In that same year he was made a barrister in the New South Wales. Narokobi was amongst the first few Papua New Guineans to receive education abroad. In those days, preparations were underway for Papua New Guinea to gain political independence from Australia. Soon after completing his law degree, Narokobi was recruited to become the Permanent Consultant to the Constitutional Planning Committee that was chaired by his former teacher Michael Somare. Narokobi thus had a personal hand in the writing of what became the Constitution when Papua New Guinea gained independence in 1975.

Narokobi died in March 2010 after a brief illness. Prime Minister Michael Somare paid tribute to him as "a humble man who dedicated his life to the development of a legal regime that incorporates Melanesian values".

== Political career ==
After Papua New Guinea gained independence, Narokobi held several jobs including serving as the legal advisor to the provincial government in his home province, East Sepik, he also worked as a private lawyer, a lecturer in law at the University of Papua New Guinea and had a stint as an acting judge in the Papua New Guinea National and Supreme Courts. He has published a number of papers and articles which are scattered in various journals and several books including The Melanesian Way; Life and Leadership in Melanesia and Lo Bilong Yumi Yet and a short book of fiction entitled Two Seasons.

Narokobi aligned with a team of like minded Papua New Guineans to start their Melanesian Alliance Party. The original founders of this Party include John Momis, John Kaputin and Moi Avei. John Momis was the Deputy Chairman of the Constitutional Planning Committee which recruited Narokobi as their Permanent Consultant. Narokobi became actively involved in politics when he decided to contest the national elections in 1982 where he ran an unsuccessful campaign against his former teacher Michael Somare for the East Sepik Regional Seat. Learning from his failed election in 1982, Narokobi entered Parliament in 1987 after toppling Tony Bais in the Wewak Open Electorate. He enjoyed three terms as the Member for Wewak and was defeated in the 2002 elections. As a lawyer and thinker, Narokobi was a firm believer in human rights, a staunch advocate of Melanesian philosophy and identity, and he supported strongly the call for a free and independent West Papua. He was also a devout and a highly respected member of the Catholic Church in Papua New Guinea.

National Parliament of Papua New Guinea
Preceded by Iairo Lasaro	Speaker of the National Parliament of Papua New Guinea; 1999–2002	Succeeded by Bill Skate
