= National Party (Papua New Guinea) =

- Leader: Kerenga Kua
- President: David Yak
- General Secretary: Dick Wama
- National Parliament: 3 / 118

Website
- Facebook page

The Papua New Guinea National Party is a political party in Papua New Guinea.

It was formed in September 1969 by Thomas Kavali, Sabumei Kofikai and Siwi Kurondo when the three MPs broke away from the Compass Party. It was formally launched on 14 November 1969. (Kofikai later rejoined the Compass Party). Paul Pora and later Iambakey Okuk were also prominent members.

At the 2002 election, the party won 3 of 109 seats. The party won 1 out of 109 seats in the 2007 General Elections. It was led into the 2012 election by Simon Sanangke from outside parliament; however, the party won no seats.

It is currently led by MP Kerenga Kua, who assumed the leadership in 2016 after his resignation from the National Alliance Party.

As of May 2019, the party has 2 seats in the National Parliament.
