= Mekere Morauta =

7th Prime Minister of Papua New Guinea

The Right Honourable Sir Mekere Morauta KCMG, PC
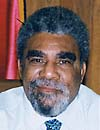
- Morauta in 2000

7th Prime Minister of Papua New Guinea
- In office 14 July 1999 – 5 August 2002
- Monarch: Elizabeth II
- Governor General: Sir Silas Atopare
- Preceded by: Bill Skate
- Succeeded by: Sir Michael Somare

Personal details
- Born: 12 June 1946 Kukipi, Territory of Papua (now Papua New Guinea)
- Died: 19 December 2020 (aged 74) Brisbane, Queensland, Australia
- Party: People's Democratic Movement
- Spouse(s): Louise Morauta; Lady Roslyn Morauta
- Education: University of Papua New Guinea, Flinders University
- Profession: Economist

Sir Mekere Morauta KCMG PC (12 June 1946 – 19 December 2020) was a Papua New Guinean politician and economist who served as the 7th Prime Minister of Papua New Guinea from 1999 to 2002. Inheriting a depressed economy and a fractious legislature, he embarked on fundamental reforms of the country's economy and political system.

Before entering politics, Morauta led the post-independence process of building financial infrastructure in Papua New Guinea as Secretary of Finance, Managing Director of the state-owned Papua New Guinea Banking Corporation, and Governor of the central bank. As a member of parliament, he represented Port Moresby North West from 1997 until 2012, and again from 2017 until his death in 2020.

Morauta remained an active opposition leader during the successive governments of Sir Michael Somare and Peter O'Neill, especially focusing on the politics of natural resources.

== Personal background ==
Sir Mekere was born in 1946 in Kukipi, a coastal village east of Kerema in the Gulf Province of Papua New Guinea. He was educated at local primary schools, at Kerema High and at Sogeri National High School. He went on to study at the University of Papua New Guinea, where in 1970 he became the first student to obtain a Bachelor of Economics. He was also an exchange student at Flinders University in South Australia.

After graduating from university he worked as an economist in both the public and private sectors. In 1975, he was the first Papua New Guinean to be appointed Secretary of the Department of Finance, a position which he held until 1982. Other positions he held included Managing Director of the government's commercial bank, the Papua New Guinea Banking Corporation (1983–1992), and Governor of the Bank of Papua New Guinea (July 1993 – September 1994), PNG's central bank. Morauta was also a successful businessman after he retired from governing the central bank. From 1994 to 1997, he was executive chairman of Morauta Investments, Ltd. (Delta Seafoods and Morauta and Associates). After entering politics he withdrew from actively managing the firm and his wife Lady Roslyn Morauta took over the management of his businesses.

Sir Mekere was a member of the so-called "Gang of Four", a group of influential young civil service chiefs who played a leading role in holding together public administration and public policy in the formative decade or so after Papua New Guinea's independence in 1975. The other members of the group were Charles Lepani, Sir Rabbie Namaliu and Sir Anthony Siaguru. Namaliu also later went on to become prime minister. Morauta maintained from that period a strong professional and warm personal relationship with the Australian economist Ross Garnaut.

== Political career ==
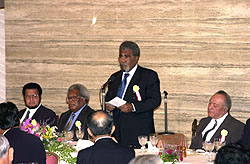
Morauta (standing) at the PALM 2000 summit in Japan

Sir Mekere entered the National Parliament of Papua New Guinea in July 1997 as the member for Moresby North-West. He was in 1998/99 Minister for Fisheries in the government of Bill Skate that emerged from the 1997 elections. The Skate government did not cope with the economic and political crises that beset PNG then and the government was defeated in a vote of no confidence. Sir Mekere was then, in July 1999 elected by parliament as prime minister with a huge majority : 99 votes for Sir Mekere and 5 votes for his challenger. His government was a reforming government and developed policies to deal with the crises. Sir Mekere was re-elected in Moresby North West in 2002 and 2007.

However, he was manoeuvered out of government by Sir Michael Somare after the 2002 elections. Somare's National Alliance Party (NA) was the biggest party with 19 out of the 109 seats as compared to 12 for Mekere's People's Democratic Movement. Somare excluded Morauta in the coalition building after the elections and Morauta became leader of the opposition. However he was also deposed from that post by a coup within his party and spent 2004–2007 on the government bench. This is in PNG distinct from being in government.

He was in government again in the period of the 2011–2012 Papua New Guinean constitutional crisis. Morauta was then Minister for Public Enterprises in the Peter O'Neill/Belden Namah cabinet that was formed in 2011 after a vote of no confidence put an end to the Somare/Abal government.

In May 2012, he announced that, after fifteen years in Parliament, he would not stand for re-election and so left Parliament in June 2012. However, he became during the O'Neil/Leo Dion government in the period 2012–2017 a player in major controversies. This resulted in calls for him to stand again. He decided therefore to give in to major pressures and stood again successfully in Moresby North-West in 2017.

=== Party identification ===
He joined parliament in 1997 as a member of the People's Democratic Movement (PDM). PDM was founded by Paias Wingti who lost his seat in the 1997 election and Morauta became the party leader.

During his time as prime minister, between 1999 and 2002, Morauta was also leader of the PDM. When Sir Michael Somare took over as prime minister after the 2002 general elections, it was expected that Morauta would be leader of the opposition. However, he was challenged from within his own party by John Muingnepe, the deputy leader of the party. Muingnepe dismissed Morauta as leader of the party in favor of Paias Wingti who had succeeded in returning to parliament in 2002. PDM split then into two groups. After being deposed as leader Morauta left to form his own party, the Papua New Guinea Party. Morauta had advocated already to change the name of PMD to indicate a fresh start. Morauta was installed as leader of the opposition after a successful appeal to the Registrar of Political Parties and the Ombudsman Commission against the actions of Muingnepe.

He did not gain acceptance among his colleagues in the opposition and became part of the government bench. After the 2007 election, he became again leader of the opposition until he joined the O'Neill/Namah government in 2011. He stood as an independent in the 2017 election. Morauta then joined the ranks of the Pangu Pati under the leadership of Sam Basil together with 4 other Independent MP's.

This did not last long: the Pangu Pati joined the government bench and Morauta was again an independent. Party identification and formation is not a determining factor in PNG politics: coalition building is crucial. Morauta was a politician who had a strong regional base in Gulf and Western province because of the economic importance of his fishing interests as well as the benefits brought by the Ok Tedi mine.

He had also a solid base in Port Moresby. He was elected four times in the same constituency. However, power eluded him often because of difficulties in forging coalitions.

== Morauta government ==
The Morauta government was in office from 14 July 1999 until 5 August 2002 and deployed far reaching initiatives. The most urgent task when coming to power was macro economic stabilization. Morauta looked back with satisfaction in his last budget speech before the election in 2002 on lower interest rates, lower inflation and a more stable currency. This had been achieved with the support of the International Financial Institutions and the Australian government.

Second, the financial structure of PNG was reformed. The independence of the Central Bank was restored and reinforced. The government withdrew from the banking sector. Government used to be a major player in the banking sector through the Papua New Guinea Banking Corporation (PNGBC). This bank was privatised. The state owned enterprises (SOES) were brought together under a holding company called the Independent Public Business Corporation (IPBC). This was supposed to be a shell company that refrained as much as possible from direct management of the businesses under its control. Its core function was to stimulate the privatisation of SOES and managing the dividends that came from those enterprises.

Thirdly, there were major political reforms aimed at strengthening party formation. MPs used to shift allegiances easily and created therefore political instability. The Organic Law on the Integrity of Political Parties and Candidates (OLIPPAC) had as its main provision that MPs had to remain loyal to the Prime Minister they had chosen whether they had supported the PM on a party platform or as independents. It proscribed crossing the floor on virtually all issues. It also laid down a framework for the organisation and registration of political parties. Similarly the electoral system was changed from a First Past the Post system to a system of Limited Preferential Voting. The idea was that candidates under such a system would approach other candidates searching for support in voters casting second or more preferences. This would stimulate cooperation between candidates and encourage stable party formation.

Fourthly, government involvement in the natural resources sector was reorganised. Previous governments had involved themselves more and more with managing such resources through equity participation. Orogen Minerals Ltd was the major vehicle to bring government and private investment together in natural resources projects. The Morauta government sold the government's 51% controlling interest in Orogen to Oil Search Ltd. Government withdrew therefore from direct management and was merely drawing dividends from Oil Search. A different vehicle was created for the big Ok Tedi mine in Western Province. BHP was the controlling interest and manager of this mine. A tailings dam broke and BHP was faced with big claims of environmental damages. BHP wanted to avoid these and these were settled by transferring their shares to an entity representing the people of Western Province : the Papua New Guinea Sustainable Development Fund. Income from these shares was used for development projects in Western province and Papua New Guinea as a whole. However, one third of that income was paid in a trust account in Singapore as a reserve for the people in Western Province when the mine would be exhausted. The Mineral Resources Development Corporation (MRDC) remained in existence. It was originally also a vehicle for government equity participation. However, its mission was limited when Orogen was established. MRDC's task was merely to administer the equity interest of landowner groups and provincial governments in natural resources projects.

The Morauta government faced stiff opposition after the first benefits of macro economic stabilization were realized and economic reforms were on the table. This opposition was primarily directed against austerity and privatization demanded by the International Financial Institutions and the Australian government. Soldiers rebelled when a report was leaked proposing the curtailment of the army and even merging it with the police into a mere paramilitary force. Soldiers protested not only against these plans but also strongly against the terms of retrenchment.

A widespread protest movement of soldiers, workers and especially students emerged against the influence of the World Bank, IMF and the Australian government. During student protests against the privatizations in 2001, three students were shot dead by police. At a meeting with the parents of a dead student, Sir Mekere referred to the previous loss of his son and he described the events as "the blackest day in our nation's history".

Morauta entered the elections of 2002 as a highly respected reformer, but this did not find favor with the voters. His PMD party declined from 42 to 17 seats. The National Alliance Party had fought a hard campaign against privatization and won the largest number of seats and therefore could invite the prime minister. Michael Somare succeeded in bringing together a large coalition of 88 votes in the 109 seat parliament. The PDM party boycotted this election. Somare put further privatisations on hold but he did not backtrack on the reforms that had already been implemented. Morauta held the portfolio of Minister of Finance from 1999 to 2000.

=== Effects of the reforms by the Morauta cabinet ===
The long lasting beneficial effects of the reforms by the Morauta cabinet were most clearly felt in the macro economic situation. The Bank of Papua New Guinea could operate independently of political influence and this was especially felt in debt management. Public debt decreased from 72.3% in 2000 to 25.5% in 2010. External debt fell also spectacularly from over 50% of GDP in 2000 to just 10% in 2010.

The decade 2000–2010 was in contrast to the decade of 1990–2000 characterized by a stable currency (Kina), low and stable inflation and a sharp decline in interest rates. Prime Minister Michael Somare, left the reforms of the Morauta government intact and could benefit from those. A fiscally conservative attitude of the Somare government as well as high commodity prices in the second half of the decade were important as well.

The political reforms left a much more mixed legacy. The Somare government that followed the Morauta government was the first PNG government that made a full term. The increased stability in political life seems at first sight to be due to the reforms. However, closer inspection makes this doubtful. The reforms did not lead to a decrease in the number of parties or the emergence of policy driven parties. PNG politics remained dominated by opportunistic diverse coalitions. The ban on switching allegiance to a particular prime minister did not work, if only because the prime minister switched seeking support. The increased stability is in the first place due to organizational arrangements in parliament: first, a long grace period during which votes of no-confidence are not allowed and second, scheduling sessions advantageously for the government due to a coalition between the speaker of parliament and the prime minister.

Finally, the Supreme Court of Papua New Guinea considered in 2010 the provisions in OLIPPAC contrary to the freedoms guaranteed in the Constitution of Papua New Guinea.

The third set of reforms : privatization and regulating income from natural resources became the major issue in the opposition by Sir Mekere. The reorganization of the natural resources sector by the Morauta government led to a stable income from the sector. Rent from Natural Resources provided in the decade 2000–2010 a large share of GDP: on average 45.74% as compared to an average of 28.9% in the whole period 1970–2014. However, the Somare governments returned to increased state intervention in the sector through equity participation. This gave rise to opposition by Morauta. Sir Mekere Morauta gave himself a review of the achievements of that cabinet when departing from politics in 2012 and stressed that the reforms were incomplete: much work still needed to be done.

== Sir Mekere Morauta in opposition ==
Sir Mekere Morauta had the same two crucial concerns in the variety of political positions he had between 2002 and 2017. Primarily and above all, he was concerned about the concentration of power in PNG. He protested against the emasculation of parliament and the rise of politically sanctioned economic power outside parliament. He advocated as much privatisation as possible; when there was government ownership, he pleaded for a maximum distance between politics/government and the enterprises involved. This was linked to his second major concern: the management of PNG's natural resources and especially government participation in such projects. From 2012 onwards his criticism of the governance of the O'Neill government broadened: he became increasingly pessimistic about the economy as a whole.

The power of parliament: Somare proposed immediately after the defeat of Morauta in 2002 an extension of the grace period for the government in power from 18 to 36 months. During the grace period no-confidence motions cannot be tabled. Parliament rejected this proposal twice but government did not relent. Morauta challenged this attempt to ignore parliament before the courts. There were various attempts at votes of no confidence when the grace period of this Somare government ended in 2004. Morauta was not active in these and this has to be seen in the light of being ousted from the post of leader of the opposition.

In response to being slighted by the opposition, he joined the government bench. After the elections in 2007, he returned as leader of the opposition and the concentration of power outside parliamentary control became a main theme. He protested against granting IPBC power to raise loans outside the normal controls of the Ministry of finance and the Central Bank. The Minister, Arthur Somare, was securing loans in Abu Dhabi just by himself. He strongly objected against further concentration of power when Arthur Somare was appointed as Minister of Finance on top of his appointment as Minister for Public Corporations. When the grace period ended in 2009 Morauta actively proposed a vote of no confidence. This was blocked by the speaker resorting to procedural matters such as leaving the issue in committee through adjournment. This resistance was overcome in 2011 and the Speaker allowed a no confidence vote. The Abal government was brought down. Abal was a caretaker while Sir Michael Somare was in hospital in Singapore. Morauta became Minister of Public enterprises in the O’Neill/Namah government that succeeded the Abal government. Morauta charged Arthur Somare, his predecessor, in that position, with bad management, corruption and theft. The loss of parliamentary oversight and ignoring the parliamentary approved legal framework was crucial in these criticisms: "The failure of Public Enterprises to obtain legally required approvals has played a significant role in their financial decline and in substantial costs to the taxpayer. The old IPBC had become a secretive, unaccountable organisation that disregarded due process". At the time when Morauta decided to return to politics in 2016/2017, the same criticisms returned: "The National Parliament is in danger of becoming a rubber stamp for the decisions taken by the Prime Minister, surrounded by a small group of unelected advisers, high-priced foreign consultants and vested interests. In recent years the Office of the Prime Minister and those who influence it have come to dominate the structures and processes of decision-making by the Parliament and the Executive".

The management of natural resources: When Morauta left office in 2012 there was no government holding company specifically for natural resources projects. Morauta's policy was that there should be an arms length distance between the management of enterprises and the government. The independent Public Business Corporation (IPBC) supervised all the enterprises in which the government participated and a minister was in charge of that company. It was definitely not meant to be involved in direct management. Arthur Somare changed that policy when he was Minister of Public Corporations. He established Petromin which was meant to be more than merely a holding company: the management of natural resources moved out of the mere control of IPBC. Government went into business.

The IPIC loan: Arthur Somare, then minister of public enterprises, wanted to promote government's shareholding in enterprises in line with that policy. This became an urgent concern in the LNG/PNG gas project. Government was facing a cash call, but it had no money. Therefore, he financed the acquisition of equity in LNG/PNG through a loan from the International Petroleum Investment Corporation (IPIC) in Abu Dhabi. Government income therefore became dependent upon profit and a change in taxation led to more dependence upon profit instead of income or output.

Arthur Somare only maintained corporation tax (a tax on profits) and waived income tax, GST and withholding tax for LNG. Sir Mekere Morauta as leader of the opposition protested strongly in 2002 against this loss of revenue for the government of PNG. Morauta protested as well against the loan from the Sovereign Wealth Fund of Abu Dhabi (IPIC). The loan from IPIC was secured through the government interest in enterprises under PNG's Independent Public Business Corporation (IPBC). Moreover, IPIC got the option to be repaid by the government shareholding in Oil Search plus the amount that the value of the shares would fall short of the amount loaned at the time of redemption. In the meantime, government had to pay interest on the loan. Morauta considered the arrangement risky as government could lose valuable assets and he also considered it unwise as it had to be repaid before the income stream from LNG/PNG was available to service the loan. He was proved right. The PNG government could not service the loan and the shares plus the difference between the value of the shares and the loan went to IPIC.

Ok Tedi and SNDP: Morauta's decision to leave politics in 2012 was stymied by the decision of prime minister O’Neill to nationalise without compensation the Ok Tedi mine and the majority owner of the mine: Papua New Guinea Sustainable Development Program (PNGSDP). The mine was according to O’Neill run for the benefit of foreigners and local people still suffered from the environmental problems under the new ownership that should have tackled these. O’Neill declared as an opening shot the chairman of the Ok Tedi board, the economist Ross Garnaut, a friend of Morauta, a prohibited immigrant. Morauta proposed that the government should pay compensation for the mine to the SNDP. The SNDP was according to him owned by the people of Western Province. O’Neill refused and took possession of the mine. Morauta divested as much as possible the assets of PNGSDP within PNG and distributed this in Western Province. The external fund of PNGSDP to the tune of US$1.5 billion was located in Singapore and therefore out of reach for the O’Neill government. That fund was meant to be used for projects when the mine was exhausted and was under control of Morauta. The fund became subject of protracted legal battles; Morauta as chairman of PNGSDP embarked on a case for arbitration before the International Centre for Settlement of Investment Disputes (ICSID) in Washington. PNGSDP requested a restitution of the shares taken by government. The case was not considered admissible to the court of arbitration because the government of PNG had not assented to the arbitration. The PNGSDP started at the same time as a court case at the Supreme Court in Singapore protesting against the government's removal of directors and its chairman, Morauta. The PNG government retaliated with a case in the High Court in Singapore alleging misappropriation of funds in PNGSDP. The claim of misappropriation was thrown out. However, the High Court in Singapore gave government representatives as directors the right to inspect the books of PNGSDP. The government appealed. Morauta started two cases within the PNG court system. In one case it sought the rights of PNGSDP to dividends from the Ok Tedi mine. Morauta had as well started a court case as a private citizen in the Supreme Court of Papua New Guinea challenging the constitutionality of the Act appropriating the Ok Tedi mine. It was decided that he had no standing in the case: the case had to be brought by the company PNGSDP. That company has been taken over by the government and can therefore not be plaintiff and defendant at the same time. Production and profitability at the mine dropped significantly after nationalisation. This was also caused by climatological factors, but for Morauta the cause was in the first place in the management: "They show that a well-managed and very profitable company under PNGSDP’s majority ownership has been turned into a corporate disaster under Mr O’Neill, as I predicted", Sir Mekere said. The Singapore high court came to a verdict on the ownership of PNGSDP in April 2019. The judge produced a 149-page judgment in which it considered the reasoning of the government compelling but wanting in one crucial respect: there was no evidence to back up the argument. Prime Minister Peter O’Neill announced immediately to appeal against the ruling. The change of government in 2019 brought no difference in the government's position. The new prime minister, James Marape, travelled very soon after taking power to Singapore in an attempt to take control over the fund. He intended to avoid the courts and hoped to put pressure on those professionals who managed the fund. He was accompanied by politicians from Western province. The latter took an ambiguous position: they welcomed the Singapore ruling and asked at the same time to bring the management of the fund back to PNG.

The UBS loan: The government of PNG had thus lost the shares in OilSearch in exchange for shares in LNG/PNG. The PNG government made however an agreement with Oil Search that it could buy shares from an expanded share capital. UBS Australia loaned the government of PNG $A 1.3 billion in 2013 to buy a ten percent share in Oil Search. Oil Search wanted to use that money to buy a participation in the next big gas development, the Elk/Antelope field. The PNG government wanted to service the loan from UBS through the proceeds from the previous gas field, the LNG/PNG project. The loan was secured by a claim on the government's Oil Search shares. Morauta did not comment immediately after the loan was made. However, in October 2015 when maturity of the loan was nearing, he asked together with the ex-prime minister Michael Somare for more transparency and information on the loan. The loan was according to them illegal and posed a danger to the PNG economy. The PNG government failed to repay when the loan matured in mid 2016. When the loan matured, it was refinanced but its ultimate fate was reached in 2017. The government lost in that process the shares in Oil Search and a big sum of money. Mekere Morauta as MP asked for a full government enquiry after the termination of the loan agreement: Prime Minister O’Neill and Oil Search Manager Peter Botten should testify. Prime minister Marape has installed a Commission of inquiry under the leadership of the chief justice and with the head of the anti corruption Task force Sweep as counsel. Its brief is limited to the legality of the events and it has to report within three months.

The hopes on a PNG Sovereign Wealth Fund were essential in Morauta's analysis of the economy. Proceeds from the gas fields should be channelled into a Sovereign Wealth Fund under mixed government and private sector management dedicated to building and maintaining infrastructure. Such hopes appear idle after these debacles.

In 2019, his work in the opposition was a major factor in the O’Neill/Abel government losing power. However, this did not result in Morauta returning to the role of prime minister: he lost the leadership vote to James Marape.

Sir Mekere Morauta was a highly praised and at the same time controversial politician. It is logical that his political opponents, for example Arthur Somare and Peter O’Neill did not appreciate his ideas. However, the criticism of Morauta is broader. For example: Mao Zeming, who was his deputy prime minister between 1999 and 2002 was highly critical when Morauta re-entered politics. Zeming queried the successes of the Morauta government as well as his leadership.

== Personal life ==
Sir Mekere was married to Lady Roslyn Morauta, an economist. He had two sons, James and Stephen, from a previous marriage to Dr Louise Morauta. His younger son Stephen died in 1999.

== Death ==
Morauta died of cancer in Brisbane on 19 December 2020. James Marape called him "the number one prime minister in the country", while Julius Chan remembered him as a friend and "visionary leader". Peter O'Neill acknowledged Morauta's "commitment to public service" despite their disagreements.

== Honours ==
In 1990, Morauta was made a Knight Bachelor. He was appointed Knight Commander of the Order of St Michael and St George (KCMG) in the 2009 Queen's Birthday Honours.

== See also ==
- List of members of the Papua New Guinean Parliament who died in office

Political offices
Preceded by Bill Skate	Prime Minister of Papua New Guinea; 1999–2002	Succeeded by Sir Michael Somare
Preceded by Michael Somare	Leader of the Opposition; 2002–2004	Succeeded by Peter O'Neill
Preceded by Peter O'Neill	Leader of the Opposition; 2007–2011	Succeeded by Belden Namah
