= Members of the National Parliament of Papua New Guinea, 2012–2017 =

This is a list of members of the National Parliament of Papua New Guinea from 2012 to 2017, as elected at the 2012 election.

Member	Party	Electorate	Province	Term in office
Charles Abel	People's National Congress	Alotau Open	Milne Bay	2007–present
Anderson Agiru (Note: Hela Provincial MP Anderson Agiru died on 28 April 2016. No by-election will be held due to the proximity of the 2017 election.)	People's United Assembly	Hela Provincial	Hela	1997–2002, 2007–2016
Paru Aihi (Note: Kairuku-Hiri Open MP Paru Aihi was unseated by the National Court on 3 December 2012 after he was found to have committed bribery. Peter Isoaimo, the successful petitioner against Aihi, won the resulting by-election in February 2014.)	People's National Congress	Kairuku-Hiri Open	Central	2007–2012
Tony Aimo (Note: The National Court voided the election of Ambunti-Dreikikir Open MP Ezekiel Anisi on 28 November 2012, finding that he had been too young to legally hold office when elected, and declared losing candidate and former MP Tony Aimo to have been rightfully elected. Aimo served as the MP for Ambunti-Dreikikir until Anisi won a Supreme Court appeal on 28 June 2013, at which time the court unseated Aimo and ordered a by-election in the seat. Anisi won the resulting by-election in December 2013.)	National Alliance Party	Ambunti-Dreikikir Open	East Sepik	2002–2012, 2012–2013
Benny Allan	People's National Congress	Unggai-Bena Open	Eastern Highlands	2002–present
Labi Amaiu	People's Movement for Change/ People's National Congress	Moresby North-East Open	NCD	2012–2017
Ezekiel Anisi (Note: Ambunti-Dreikikir Open MP Ezekiel Anisi died on 24 May 2017, during the campaign period for the 2017 election.)	People's Progress Party/ People's National Congress	Ambunti-Dreikikir Open	East Sepik	2012, 2013–2017
David Arore (Note: The National Court held that the election of Ijivitari MP David Arore was null and void on 29 May 2015, after he was found to have committed bribery. Arore won the resulting by-election in November 2015.)	Triumph Heritage Empowerment Party/ People's National Congress	Ijivitari Open	Northern	2007–2015, 2015–2017
Robert Atiyafa	Independent/People's National Congress	Henganofi Open	Eastern Highlands	2012–present
Lauta Atoi	People's National Congress	North Bougainville Open	Bougainville	2011–2017
Francis Awesa	People's National Congress	Imbonggu Open	Southern Highlands	2007–2017
Sam Basil	Papua New Guinea Party/Pangu Party	Bulolo Open	Morobe	2007–present
Charlie Benjamin	People's National Congress	Manus Provincial	Manus	1997–2007, 2012–present
Roy Biyama	People's National Congress	Middle Fly Open	Western	2002–present
Byron Chan	People's Progress Party	Namatanai Open	New Ireland	2002–2017
Sir Julius Chan	People's Progress Party	New Ireland Provincial	New Ireland	1977–1997, 2007–present
Bob Dadae (Note: Kabwum Open MP Bob Dadae became Governor-General of Papua New Guinea on 28 February 2017. No by-election will be held due to the proximity of the 2017 election.)	People's National Congress	Kabwum Open	Morobe	2002–2017
Camillus Dangma	Independent	Kerowagi Open	Chimbu	2012–2017
Lucas Dekena (Note: The National Court held that the election of Gumine MP Lucas Dekena was null and void on 15 January 2013 and ordered a by-election in the seat. After a series of appeals, the Supreme Court quashed the by-election decision on 30 August 2013 and instead directed a recount of the 2012 results. Nick Kuman, the successful petitioner against Dekena and a former MP, was declared the winner of the recount, and on 22 November 2013 a further National Court decision declared Kuman to have been duly elected.)	Papua New Guinea Party	Gumine Open	Chimbu	2007–2013
Leo Dion	Triumph Heritage Empowerment Party/ People's National Congress	East New Britain Provincial	East New Britain	2000–2017
Mai Dop	United Resources Party	Jimi Open	Jiwaka	2012–2017
Nixon Duban (Note: Madang Open MP Nixon Duban was unseated by the National Court on 3 June 2013 after he was found to have committed bribery. Duban won the resulting by-election in December 2013. Subsequent challenges to the by-election result led to a recount but did not overturn the result.)	People's National Congress	Madang Open	Madang	2012–2013, 2013–2017
William Duma	United Resources Party	Hagen Open	Western Highlands	2002–present
Ken Fairweather	People's National Congress/ People's Progress Party	Sumkar Open	Madang	2007–2017
Ron Ganarafo	Independent/People's National Congress	Daulo Open	Eastern Highlands	1997–2002, 2012–2017
Aide Ganasi (Note: South Fly Open MP Aide Ganasi died on 8 November 2016. No by-election will be held due to the proximity of the 2017 election.)	People's National Congress	South Fly Open	Western	2012–2016
Robert Ganim	People's Party/People's National Congress	Wabag Open	Enga	2012–2017
James Gau	Triumph Heritage Empowerment Party	Rai Coast Open	Madang	2010–2017
Delilah Gore	Triumph Heritage Empowerment Party/ People's National Congress	Sohe Open	Northern	2012–2017
Kila Haoda	Independent/People's National Congress	Central Provincial	Central	2012–2017
John Hickey	National Alliance Party	Bogia Open	Madang	2002–2017
Peter Ipatas	People's Party/People's National Congress	Enga Provincial	Enga	1997–present
Paul Isikiel	People's National Congress	Markham Open	Morobe	2012–2017
Peter Isoaimo	National Alliance Party	Kairuku-Hiri Open	Central	2014–present
Gary Juffa	People's Movement For Change	Northern Provincial	Northern	2012–present
Jim Kas	Papua New Guinea Party/ National Alliance Party/ United Resources Party	Madang Provincial	Madang	1997–2000, 2012–2017
Elias Kapavore (Note: Pomio Open MP Paul Tiensten was sentenced to nine years imprisonment in March 2014 after his conviction on misappropriation charges. Elias Kapavore won the resulting by-election in April 2015.)	Independent/People's National Congress	Pomio Open	East New Britain	2015–present
Havila Kavo	People's National Congress	Gulf Provincial	Gulf	2007–2017
De Kewanu	Independent/People's National Congress	Mendi Open	Southern Highlands	2012–2017
Bire Kimisopa	Independent/New Generation Party	Goroka Open	Eastern Highlands	2002–2007, 2012–2017
Mehrra Minne Kipefa	Star Alliance Party/United Resources Party	Obura-Wonenara Open	Eastern Highlands	2012–present
Ronny Knight	New Generation Party/National Party	Manus Open	Manus	2012–2017
Komun Joe Koim	Independent/People's Democratic Movement	Angalimp-South Waghi Open	Jiwaka	2012–2017
Noah Kool	Independent/People's National Congress	Chimbu Provincial	Chimbu	2012–2017
Jeffery Komal	People's National Congress	Nipa-Kutubu Open	Southern Highlands	2012–present
Boka Kondra (Note: North Fly Open MP Boka Kondra was found guilty on misappropriation charges by a leadership tribunal in April 2015, and was recommended to be dismissed from office in May 2015. He successfully applied to stay the decision while he appealed to the National and Supreme Courts, but was dismissed in December 2016 following the failure of his Supreme Court appeal. No by-election will be held due to the proximity of the 2017 election.)	People's National Congress	North Fly Open	Western	2007–2016
Loujaya Kouza	Indigenous People's Party/ People's National Congress/ Triumph Heritage Empowerment Party	Lae Open	Morobe	2012–2017
Kerenga Kua	National Alliance Party/National Party	Sinasina-Yongomugl Open	Chimbu	2012–present
Jeffery Kuave	Papua New Guinea Country Party/ People's National Congress	Lufa Open	Eastern Highlands	2012–2017
Tobias Kulang	PNG Constitutional Democratic Party/ People's Progress Party/ People's National Congress	Kundiawa Open	Chimbu	2012–2017
Nick Kuman	People's National Congress	Gumine Open	Chimbu	2002–2007, 2013–present
James Lagea	Independent/People's National Congress	Kagua-Erave Open	Southern Highlands	2007–2017
Joseph Lelang	Coalition for Reform Party	Kandrian-Gloucester Open	West New Britain	2012–present
Joe Lera	United Resources Party	Bougainville Provincial	Bougainville	2012–present
Amkat Mai (Note: The National Court held that the election of West Sepik Provincial MP Amkat Mai was null and void on 4 October 2013. Mai won the resulting by-election in August 2015.)	Triumph Heritage Empowerment Party/ National Alliance Party	West Sepik Provincial	West Sepik	2012–2013, 2015–2017
Mark Maipakai	Triumph Heritage Empowerment Party	Kikori Open	Gulf	2002–2017
Michael Malabag	People's National Congress	Moresby North-West Open	NCD	2012–2017
Nixon Mangape	Independent/ Triumph Heritage Empowerment Party	Lagaip-Porgera Open	Enga	2012–2017
James Marape	People's National Congress	Tari Open	Hela	2007–present
Dr Allan Marat	Melanesian Liberal Party	Rabaul Open	East New Britain	2002–present
Richard Maru	Independent/People's National Congress	Yangoru-Saussia Open	East Sepik	2012–present
Francis Marus	Papua New Guinea Party/ People's National Congress	Talasea Open	West New Britain	2007–2017
Timothy Masiu (Note: South Bougainville Open MP Steven Pirika Kama died on 20 February 2016. Timothy Masiu won the resulting by-election in July 2016.)	People's Progress Party/ National Alliance Party	South Bougainville Open	Bougainville	2016–present
Richard Mendani	Papua New Guinea Country Party/ United Resources Party/ National Alliance Party	Kerema Open	Gulf	2012–present
Ben Micah	People's Progress Party	Kavieng Open	New Ireland	1992–1997, 2012–2017
Jimmy Miringtoro	People's National Congress	Central Bougainville Open	Bougainville	2007–2017
Solan Mirisim	Independent/People's National Congress	Telefomin Open	West Sepik	2012–present
Daniel Mona (Note: Goilala Open MP Daniel Mona died on 4 February 2015. William Samb won the resulting by-election in August 2015.)	Papua New Guinea Party/ People's National Congress	Goilala Open	Central	2012–2015
Wera Mori	Triumph Heritage Empowerment Party/ People's National Congress	Chuave Open	Chimbu	2012–present
Sasindran Muthuvel	Coalition for Reform Party/ People's National Congress	West New Britain Provincial	West New Britain	2012–present
Belden Namah	Papua New Guinea Party	Vanimo-Green River Open	West Sepik	2007–present
Kelly Naru	Independent/Christian Democratic Party	Morobe Provincial	Morobe	2012–2017
Wesley Nukundj	People's Party/People's National Congress	Dei Open	Western Highlands	2012–present
Peter O'Neill	People's National Congress	Ialibu-Pangia Open	Southern Highlands	2002–present
Ano Pala	People's National Congress	Rigo Open	Central	2007–2017
Powes Parkop	Social Democratic Party	Nat. Capital District Provincial	NCD	2007–present
Rimbink Pato	United Party	Wapenamanda Open	Enga	2012–present
Titus Philemon	People's Progress Party/ United Resources Party	Milne Bay Provincial	Milne Bay	1992–2002, 2012–2017
Benjamin Philip	United Resources Party/ People's National Congress	Menyamya Open	Morobe	2007–2017
Steven Pirika Kama	United Resources Party	South Bougainville Open	Bougainville	2012–2016
Dr Fabian Pok	United Resources Party	North Waghi Open	Jiwaka	1997–2002, 2012–present
Don Polye	Triumph Heritage Empowerment Party	Kandep Open	Enga	2002–2009, 2009–2017
Benjamin Poponawa	Triumph Heritage Empowerment Party/ People's National Congress	Tambul-Nebilyer Open	Western Highlands	2007–2017
Francis Potape	Papua New Guinea Party/ People's National Congress/Independent	Komo-Magarima Open	Hela	2007–2017
William Powi	People's National Congress	Southern Highlands Provincial	Southern Highlands	2012–present
Patrick Pruaitch	National Alliance Party	Aitape Lumi Open	West Sepik	2002–present
John Pundari	People's Party/People's National Congress	Kompiam-Ambum Open	Enga	1992–2002, 2007–present
William Samb	Pangu Party	Goilala Open	Central	2015–present
Ludwig Schulze (Note: Angoram Open MP Ludwig Schulze died on 8 March 2013. Salio Waipo won the resulting by-election in August 2013.)	Pangu Party	Angoram Open	East Sepik	1994–1997, 2012–2013
Ross Seymour	Papua New Guinea Party/ National Alliance Party	Huon Gulf Open	Morobe	2012–present
Jim Simatab	National Alliance Party	Wewak Open	East Sepik	2007–2010, 2012–2017
John Simon	National Alliance Party	Maprik Open	East Sepik	2012–present
Gisuwat Mangere Siniwin	People's National Congress	Nawae Open	Morobe	2012–2017
Sir Michael Somare	National Alliance Party	East Sepik Provincial	East Sepik	1968–2017
Julie Soso	Triumph Heritage Empowerment Party/ People's National Congress	Eastern Highlands Provincial	Eastern Highlands	2012–2017
Davis Steven	People's Party	Esa'ala Open	Milne Bay	2012–present
Joe Sungi	National Alliance Party	Nuku Open	West Sepik	2012–present
Malakai Tabar	Melanesian Liberal Party; National Alliance Party	Gazelle Open	East New Britain	2007–2017
Sir Puka Temu	People's National Congress	Abau Open	Central	2002–2003, 2003–present
Paul Tiensten	People's United Assembly	Pomio Open	East New Britain	2002–2014
Justin Tkatchenko	Social Democratic Party/ People's National Congress	Moresby South Open	NCD	2012–present
Ereman Tobaining Jr.	People's National Congress	Kokopo Open	East New Britain	2012–2017
Tommy Tomscoll	People's Democratic Movement/ People's National Congress/ Trust PNG Party	Middle Ramu Open	Madang	1997–2002, 2003, 2012–2017
Douglas Tomuriesa	Triumph Heritage Empowerment Party/ People's National Congress	Kiriwina-Goodenough Open	Milne Bay	2012–present
William Tongamp	New Generation Party/People's Party	Jiwaka Provincial	Jiwaka	2012–present
Koi Trape	People's National Congress	Baiyer-Mul Open	Western Highlands	2012–present
Johnson Tuke	Independent/People's National Congress/ People's Progress Party	Kainantu Open	Eastern Highlands	2012–present
Phillip Undialu	Triumph Heritage Empowerment Party/ People's National Congress	Koroba-Lake Kopiago Open	Hela	2012–present
Isaac Waigavara	People's National Congress	Okapa Open	Eastern Highlands	2012–2017
Salio Waipo	National Alliance Party	Angoram Open	East Sepik	2013–present
Mogerema Sigo Wei	People's Party/People's National Congress	Karimui-Nomane Open	Chimbu	2012–2017
Gordon Wesley (Note: The National Court held that the election of Samarai-Murua MP Gordon Wesley was null and void in December 2014 after upholding an allegation of bribery during the 2012 campaign. Wesley won the resulting by-election in May 2016.)	People's National Congress	Samarai-Murua Open	Milne Bay	2002–2014, 2016–2017
Paias Wingti	People's Democratic Movement	Western Highlands Provincial	Western Highlands	1977–2007, 2012–present
Ati Wobiro	People's United Assembly	Western Provincial	Western	2012–2017
Anton Yagama	United Resources Party	Usino-Bundi Open	Madang	2012–2017
Joseph Yopyyopy	Social Democratic Party/ United Resources Party/ Melanesian Alliance Party	Wosera-Gaui Open	East Sepik	2012–present
Mao Zeming	People's National Congress	Tewae-Siassi Open	Morobe	1995–2003, 2012–2017
Theo Zurenuoc	People's Progress Party/ People's National Congress	Finschhafen Open	Morobe	2007–2017
