= The Independent (Papua New Guinea) =

- Type: Weekly newspaper
- Owner: Word Publishing
- Founded: September 1980
- Ceased publication: June 5, 2003
- Headquarters: Boroko, Port Moresby
- Country: Papua New Guinea
- Sister newspapers: Wantok Niuspepa

The Independent was a national weekly newspaper published in Papua New Guinea from September 1980 to 5 June 2003.

It was an English-language publication. It was published in the Port Moresby suburb of Boroko by Word Publishing, owners of the Tok Pisin-language Wantok Niuspepa.

It was known as The Times of Papua New Guinea from its launch in September 1980, with Franz Albert Joku as the inaugural editor until May 1995, when it was re-branded as The Saturday Independent, amidst financial problems. It later changed its publication date to Thursday and adopted the name The Independent. In 2001, it absorbed another Word Publishing title, PNG Trade Monthly, which became a business lift-out in the newspaper. By the time of its closure, it had bureaus in Mount Hagen, Lae, Rabaul, Madang and Bougainville.

Joe R. Kanekane has described the newspaper as both "one of the pillars of investigative journalism" in PNG and "an advocate of good governance and transparency", highlighting its role in covering many of PNG's "worst corruption scandals". Its former editor, Anna Solomon, noted the paper's independent coverage of scandals concerning the activities of the Papua New Guinea Defence Force in the Bougainville Civil War, while Colin Barron cited its coverage of environmental issues, including critical coverage of activities of logging companies, and willingness to run advertisements informing landowners of their rights.

The Independent closed in June 2003, citing a challenging economic climate and the demands of competing against two national daily newspapers: the Papua New Guinea Post-Courier and The National. Together, The Times of PNG and The Independent had operated for 23 years.

== See also ==
- List of newspapers in Papua New Guinea
