= Timothy Masiu =

Papua New Guinean politician

Timothy Masiu (born 25 November 1964) is a Papua New Guinean politician. He has been a member of the National Parliament of Papua New Guinea since July 2016, representing the electorate of South Bougainville Open for the People's Progress Party (2016–2017) and National Alliance Party (2017–present).

Masiu, from Botulai village, was a journalist and broadcaster before entering politics, working for the National Broadcasting Corporation from 1981 with Radio Bougainville, Radio Enga and Radio East New Britain. He left the NBC and worked for a period as a government liaison officer for the Bougainville restoration team before becoming the New Guinea Islands bureau chief for newspaper The National from 1994 to 1999. Masiu worked as a media officer for then-Bougainville Governor John Momis before joining the office of East New Britain Governor and later Deputy Prime Minister Leo Dion as first secretary. He left Dion's office to work as government liaison officer for New Britain Palm Oil Limited, but returned in December 2014 to head Dion's Kokopo office, serving in that role until his election to parliament.

He has also served as deputy chairman of the National Broadcasting Corporation, chairman of the Vunamami Farmers' Training Centre, Bougainville team manager for the Papua New Guinea Games and co-ordinator of the "Katim Na Halivim Pikinini" children's health project. He was the unsuccessful Melanesian Alliance Party candidate for the South Bougainville seat at the 2012 election.

Masiu was elected to the National Parliament for the People's Progress Party at a July 2016 by-election caused by the death of MP Steven Pirika Kama. He left the People's Progress Party and joined the National Alliance Party in January 2017. He was re-elected for a full term at the 2017 election.

His older brother, Willie Masiu, is a member of the Bougainville House of Representatives and a minister in the Autonomous Bougainville Government.

National Parliament of Papua New Guinea
Preceded by Steven Pirika Kama	Member for South Bougainville Open; 2016–present	Incumbent
