= Anderson Agiru =

Papua New Guinean politician

Anderson Agiru MP

Member of the National Parliament of Papua New Guinea
- In office 1997–2002
- Preceded by: Dick Mune
- Succeeded by: Hami Yawari
- Constituency: Southern Highlands Provincial
- In office 2007–2012
- Preceded by: Hami Yawari
- Succeeded by: William Powi
- Constituency: Southern Highlands Provincial
- In office 2012–2016
- Preceded by: New position
- Succeeded by: Philip Undialu
- Constituency: Hela Provincial

Personal details
- Born: 1961 or 1962 Hogombe, Territory of Papua and New Guinea
- Died: April 28, 2016 (aged 54)
- Party: People's United Assembly (2012–2016)
- Other political affiliations: United Resources Party (1997–2011)
- Spouse: Cathy Kakaraya

Anderson Pawa Agiru (c. 1962 – 28 April 2016) was a Papua New Guinean politician. He was the Governor of Southern Highlands Province from 1997 to 2002 and 2007 to 2012 and the Governor of Hela Province from its creation in 2012 until his death. His position had been disputed for the final five months of his life, with a December 2015 attempt to oust him by members of the Hela assembly - posthumously decided in Agiru's favour - still being determined in the National Court at the time of his death.

== Early life and first term as Southern Highlands Governor ==
Agiru was born in Hogombe village. He was educated at Dauli Primary School and Tari High School, and received a Master of Business Administration from the Australian Institute of Company Directors. Prior to his election, he was a student activist and then first secretary to MP and government minister Parry Zeipi. Agiru was elected as Governor of Southern Highlands Province at the 1997 election, succeeding Dick Mune, and formed the United Resources Party, with himself as leader. In his first term, he criticised Ausaid, claiming that they only carried out relief efforts in "provinces where major Australian businesses are" and stated that multinational oil corporation BP had "[treated] my people with contempt" for selling its shares in local oil projects and "would not be allowed back onto the province". In July 1999, Agiru remained loyal to Bill Skate during the crisis that resulted in Skate's ouster as prime minister by Mekere Morauta; however, in December he and four other governors crossed over to support the Morauta government.

In June 1999, Agiru faced serious tribal unrest and calls for a state of emergency after Mune, who he had defeated in 1997, was killed in a car accident on the way to attend a court hearing involving a challenge to validity of Agiru's election. Agiru was one of the signatories to a peace agreement regarding conflict between the Nipa and Tari people in September 1999. It was reported in August 2000 that tribal fighting in the Southern Highlands had claimed more than 100 lives in the preceding year. On 13 October 2000, both Agiru and the provincial government were suspended by Morauta, remaining in office but stripped of their powers, with administrators called in to run the government.

In March, while still suspended, he was charged with misappropriating more than US$180,000 in public funds and released on bail. In separate proceedings, in May, he was referred to the public prosecutor and the Leadership Tribunal for failing to furnish annual statements for the period 1984 to 1993 and being in possession of a high-powered firearm. In October 2001, the National Court found Agiru's suspension unconstitutional and reinstated his powers as governor after a year. In November, he was referred to a Leadership Tribunal for the second time over an incident where he was alleged to have held a pistol to the head of another person while playing golf. He then challenged the referral to the Leadership Tribunal in court, claiming that the tribunal did not have jurisdiction because of an alleged denial of natural justice in the referral process, though it did not prevent his suspension while proceedings were ongoing. On November 28, the opposition faction of the provincial government, in association with two national ministers, attempted to oust Agiru and install Tom Tomiape as governor; however, this was declared unconstitutional in December and Agiru was reaffirmed as governor. The crisis was reported to have led to a flareup of tribal fighting which had claimed up to twenty lives.

Agiru was found guilty by the Leadership Tribunal on twelve of the fifteen counts against him on 16 January 2002, and dismissed him from office, in addition to a fine, on 18 January. Subsequent attempt to overturn the dismissal were rejected by the National Court in March, May and June, and the Supreme Court in June. As such, he was prevented from contesting the 2002 election and barred from public office for three years. Another attempt to contest the Southern Highlands supplementary election was rejected in April 2003, ruling that his ban until January 2005 would stand.

== Second term as Southern Highlands Governor ==
Agiru returned to politics at the 2007 election, defeating his replacement as governor, Hami Yawari. Yawari filed a petition challenging the result, but it was thrown out in May 2008, and again with an appeal in November. Having been leader of the United Resources Party in his first term, he continued as deputy leader under William Duma.

Agiru had been a key opponent of an early attempt to develop the region's liquefied natural gas by piping it to Queensland, Australia, advocating instead that it be developed onshore in Papua New Guinea. The opposition was successful, with proponents shifting to onshore processing instead. As negotiations intensified for the onshore development, four resource owners associations appointed Agiru as their negotiator in regard to ExxonMobil's development of the PNG Liquefied Natural Gas (LNG) project on the Hides gas field. In May, they settled on an agreement which would result in $AU9.5 billion in payments to landholders over the life of the project for what was labelled at the time as "the largest private investment in Papua New Guinea". The deal, reportedly to double PNG's gross domestic product, was finalised in December, with Agiru praised in press coverage for his "instrumental" role in "volatile, hostile and occasional violent" negotiations with landowners.

In July 2009, the National Parliament voted to create two new provinces in the highlands, Hela Province and Jiwaka Province. Agiru praised MPs for supporting the bill, stating that it had been a dream for the people of Hela to have their own province since 1974, and that it had finally been achieved. He also stated, in relation to the ExxonMobil project, "The Hela people had repeatedly said 'No Hela, no gas', but the prime minister has delivered".

In August 2010, Agiru oversaw a ban on liquor in Southern Highlands Province. By 2011, he was reported to lead one of two rival factions within the United Resource Party, with Duma leading the other. In June, Duma expelled Agiru from the URP for insubordination. In that year, he stated "building a house is naturally a man's job" and that it was "unmanly and unHuli" for Hela women to build their own houses. He continued to support Michael Somare during the prolonged dispute over his ouster as prime minister by Peter O'Neill, and in December 2011 was appointed by Somare as his would-be nominee for Deputy Prime Minister. In March 2012, he co-founded the People's United Assembly party with five other MPs, assuming the leadership of the new party.

In June 2012, he formally nominated to contest the inaugural governorship of Hela Province rather than to recontest Southern Highlands Province, declaring that "today I am closing the chapter of Southern Highlands and opening a new chapter for Hela Province."

== Governor of Hela Province ==
In 2012, having campaigned for the creation of Hela Province, he was elected as its first Governor. He switched his support to Prime Minister Peter O'Neill in the wake of the election. In September, he called for boom gates to be erected on the border of Hela Province and Southern Highlands Province. In his first budget, he supported reinvesting the proceeds of the gas project in developing agriculture in Hela, including the construction of two agribusiness factories in conjunction with an Israeli firm.

In April 2013, he criticised ExxonMobil in the media, claiming that they had not met their obligations in regard to the development of infrastructure promised as part of the gas project, and threatening legal action if they were not addressed within thirty days. This led to criticism from the company and some other MPs, who stated that negative media would "hinder progress". His threat was supported by some landowners' associations, who stated that they were ready to force the project to close if the demands were not met, while Nipa-Kutubu leaders threatened to block the road to the gas field in support and an NGO stated that people were "prepared to take action similar to how Bougainville landowners closed the Panguna Copper mine in 1989". However, by mid-May, talks with ExxonMobil and the national government had largely satisfied Agiru and the provision agreement, with agreements signed to provide a way forward.

In July 2013, Agiru, a devout Christian associated with the Evangelical Church of Papua New Guinea, moved a motion in the National Parliament of Papua New Guinea to declare Papua New Guinea a Christian country, stating that "foreign religions were coming into the country and destroying the way the people thought and believed" and that he wanted "to see if the people of PNG, the Churches and everyone agree that all forms of other religions which are not Christian must be banned from Papua New Guinea."

In November 2013, in an attempt to stop long-running tribal fights in the province, Agiru supported an operation in conjunction with the Papua New Guinea Defence Forces, which saw a combined force of 120 soldiers sent to Hela to break up the conflicts. In March 2015, a petition challenging his 2012 re-election was thrown out by the National Court. In April 2015, Agiru was rushed to hospital and placed in intensive care after kidney-related health complications. He subsequently went to China for further treatment in May.

On 22 December 2015, members of the Hela Provincial Assembly passed a motion of no-confidence attempting to remove Agiru from office, although Agiru won a court order later in the day blocking implementation of the vote until further hearings had taken place. He returned to Hela Province after a prolonged absence on 23 December, and was supported by national minister James Marape and MP Philip Undialu. He declared that he would "fight them on every front" and stated "God has healed me" in relation to his health issues. The National Court initially rejected Agiru's challenge to his removal, and Francis Potape was sworn in as governor by the end of December. National Inter-Government Relations Minister Leo Dion supported the ouster and claimed that Agiru was now only a member of the National Parliament for Hela Province and not Governor. However, on 7 January, the National Court reinstated Agiru until a full hearing in mid-February, subsequently postponed to March, with Agiru remaining in office until then. Potape then went to court in February in separate proceedings in an attempt to nullify all decisions made by Agiru in the interim.

Agiru died from a heart attack on 28 April 2016 at the age of 54, having received treatment for a kidney malfunction since June 2015. The funeral service was held at Andajali oval in Tari, and he was buried in his mother's village, Tapanda. In June, the National Court finally declared that Agiru's December dismissal was null and void and of no effect.

He was married to Cathy Kakaraya, daughter of Sir Pato Kakaraya.

National Parliament of Papua New Guinea
Preceded by Dick Mune	Member for Southern Highlands Provincial; 1997–2002	Succeeded by Hami Yawari
Preceded by Hami Yawari	Member for Southern Highlands Provincial; 2007–2012	Succeeded by William Powi
New title	Member for Hela Provincial; 2012–2016	Succeeded by Philip Undialu
