= Ezekiel Anisi =

Hon. Ezekiel Anisi MP

Member of National Parliament for Ambunti-Dreikikir Open
- In office 3 August 2012 – 28 November 2012
- Preceded by: Tony Aimo
- Succeeded by: Tony Aimo
- In office 6 January 2014 – 24 May 2017
- Preceded by: Tony Aimo
- Succeeded by: Johnson Wapunai

Personal details
- Born: 1 September 1988
- Died: 24 May 2017 (aged 28) Port Moresby
- Party: People's National Congress (2013–2017); People's Progress Party (2012–2013)
- Parent: Alex Anisi (father)
- Education: Drekikir High School; Drekikir Primary School
- Occupation: Politician

Ezekiel Anisi (1 September 1988 – 24 May 2017) was a Papua New Guinean politician. He was a member of the National Parliament of Papua New Guinea from August until October 2012, when he was unseated by the National Court, and from a December 2013 by-election until his death, representing the electorate of Ambunti-Dreikikir Open in East Sepik Province. He was the youngest MP in Papua New Guinea.

== Early life and education ==
Anisi was the son of former East Sepik Premier Alex Anisi. There are conflicting sources as to his education: his official parliamentary profile stated that he was educated at Dreikikir Primary School and Dreikikir High School, while media reports on his funeral stated that he had attended Wewak Hill International School, Kaindi Demonstration School, Bishop Leo Secondary School and Don Bosco Technical Secondary School, where he studied vehicle mechanics. Anisi listed his occupation prior to his election as having been "student".

== Political career ==
He was initially elected for the People's Progress Party at the July 2012 general election, defeating National Alliance Party MP and former minister Tony Aimo. In August 2012, Aimo challenged the result in the National Court (sitting as the Court of Disputed Returns), claiming that Anisi was under the constitutionally required age of 25 and that he was not on the electoral roll at the time of the election. The editor of newspaper The National was charged with contempt of court for their coverage of the case while it was pending judgment. The court ruled in Aimo's favour on 24 October, upholding both arguments and finding that Anisi had doctored his birth certificate. The court overturned Anisi's election, and declared Aimo elected in his place.

Anisi successfully appealed the decision to the Supreme Court, which in June 2013 ordered a by-election in the seat. However, in September he was sacked by the People's Progress Party, who claimed that he had been seeking financial aid from other parties and groups. He instead contested and won the December by-election for the governing People's National Congress. He was sworn in for a second time on 6 January 2014.

In March 2014, Anisi was reported to be in a row with the East Sepik provincial administration over the appointment of public servants and development approvals. He angrily refuted charges made by a public servant at the time claiming that he was illegally in possession of a police firearm. In April, when Peter O'Neill visited his electorate to open the Ambunti-Drekikir road, Anisi described the opening as "historic and momentous" and stated that it had reaffirmed his decision to join the People's National Congress. In January 2016, he was credited with the provision of an ambulance to a remote sub-health centre in his electorate.

== Death ==
Anisi is reported to have collapsed on 24 May 2017, whilst collecting election materials at a guesthouse in Port Moresby only weeks before the 2017 general election, where he was seeking a second term of office. A family member said he died whilst being transported to Pacific International Hospital. His sudden death at the age of 28 sparked discussion about the health of MPs in Papua New Guinea. He was granted a state funeral, which was held at the Rev Sioni Kami Memorial Church on 8 June 2017, with his casket subsequently being laid in parliament before being returned to Wewak for burial.

National Parliament of Papua New Guinea
Preceded by Tony Aimo	Member for Ambunti-Dreikikir Open; 2012	Succeeded by Tony Aimo
Preceded by Tony Aimo	Member for Ambunti-Dreikikir Open; 2013–2017	Succeeded by Johnson Wapunai
