= David Arore =

Papua New Guinean politician

David Arore (born 31 January 1974) is a Papua New Guinean politician. He was a member of the National Parliament of Papua New Guinea from 2007 until unseated by a court decision in 2015 and again from a 2015 by-election until 2017. He was Minister for Higher Education, Research, Science & Technology under Peter O'Neill from 2011 to 2014.

== First term ==
He was first elected to the National Parliament in the 2007 general election, as MP for the Ijivitari Open constituency in Oro Province. Elected as an independent, he then joined the National Alliance Party and was appointed deputy Minister for Education by Prime Minister Sir Michael Somare. When a cyclone and floods hit Oro, he was reportedly "on the ground with the people", "carrying a bag of rice, making tea for people". A petitioner having challenged the legitimacy of his election, filing claims against the Electoral Commission, the National Court in 2008 suspended Arore from Parliament, pending a recount of the ballots, but he ultimately retained his seat.

In July 2010, he and five other party members defected briefly to the Opposition, in a failed attempt to bring down the government. Within a few days, they pledged their support for the government once more, and were accepted back.

At the start of August 2011, he was again among several government MPs to join the Opposition. This time, a successful parliamentary motion of no confidence brought down the government of acting prime minister Sam Abal (standing in for Somare while the latter was hospitalised for a serious heart condition), and Peter O'Neill became prime minister. O'Neill appointed Arore as his Minister for Higher Education, Research, Science & Technology.

In January 2012, he joined Don Polye's new Triumph Heritage Empowerment Rural Party.

== Second term ==
On 19 March 2013, Arore stepped down from the government, upon being charged with bribery and graft, in connection with alleged acts during the 2012 general election. He denied the charges, but stepped down until his name could be cleared, in accordance with guidelines set down by Prime Minister O'Neill. Don Polye temporarily took over his portfolio. The corruption charges were dismissed by the district court in June, finding that there was insufficient evidence to establish a prima facie case, and Arore resumed his ministerial roles. Arore was dropped from the ministry in a February 2014 reshuffle, replaced by his party colleague Delilah Gore.

He resigned from the Triumph Heritage Empowerment Rural Party, along with three other MPs, in May 2014, following leader Polye's move to the opposition, having decided to continue to support the government. On 25 June, Arore and the other MPs joined Prime Minister O'Neill's People's National Congress. In October 2014, a long-running feud with Northern Province governor Gary Juffa came to a head when he attempted to install himself as Governor, resulting in the arrest of several of his supporters, with Juffa ultimately remaining in office.

== Unseating and re-election ==
In May 2015, the National Court (sitting as the Court of Disputed Returns) unseated Arore, finding that he was guilty of bribery during the 2012 election campaign and that his election was consequently null and void. The court ordered a by-election in his seat. The People's National Congress re-endorsed him for the by-election, resulting in criticism from the Papua New Guinea chapter of Transparency International and in the Papua New Guinea Post-Courier. He won the by-election in December 2015 and returned to parliament.

At the 2017 election, Arore contested the Northern Province governorship against incumbent Gary Juffa, rather than recontest Ijivitari Open. He finished fourth, polling only 6,129 votes to Juffa's 37,729.

National Parliament of Papua New Guinea
Preceded by Cecilking Doruba	Member for Ijivitari Open; 2007–2015; 2015–2017	Succeeded by Richard Masere
