= Jeffery Nape =

Acting governor-general of Papua New Guinea

Jeffery Nape CMG

Acting Governor General of Papua New Guinea
- In office 13 December 2010 – 20 December 2010
- Monarch: Elizabeth II
- Prime Minister: Sam Abal (acting)
- Preceded by: Paulias Matane
- Succeeded by: Michael Ogio
- In office 28 May 2004 – 29 June 2004
- Monarch: Elizabeth II
- Prime Minister: Michael Somare
- Preceded by: Bill Skate (acting)
- Succeeded by: Paulias Matane

Personal details
- Born: 1964
- Died: 8 July 2016 (aged 51–52) Port Moresby, Papua New Guinea

Jeffery Nape CMG (1964 – 8 July 2016) was, until the 2012 election, speaker of the National Parliament and twice officially and once unofficially acting governor-general of Papua New Guinea. He was elected speaker by the members of the parliament on 28 May 2004, and then immediately became acting governor-general because that office was substantively vacant. He succeeded Bill Skate in both roles.

He ceased acting as governor-general on 29 June 2004, when Paulias Matane was sworn in. When Matane stepped down in 2010, Nape regained this post.

Following the 2007 general election, Nape was re-elected as Speaker on 13 August 2007, defeating the opposition's candidate for the position, Bart Philemon, with 86 votes against 22 for Philemon. He was sworn in by Governor-General Paulias Matane on the same day.

He was appointed Companion of the Order of St Michael and St George (CMG) in the 2010 Birthday Honours.

in September 2011, Nape "dropped a bombshell" with his highly controversial decision to disqualify recently ousted Prime Minister Michael Somare, known as the "Grand Chief" and the "father of the nation", from Parliament. Nape ruled that Somare had missed three consecutive parliamentary sessions, due to being in hospital for surgery followed by a lengthy recovery. When he entered Parliament in a wheelchair, Nape "welcomed him warmly", but later declared that he was disqualifying him. Somare denied that he had missed three sessions.

In December 2011, a constitutional crisis broke out when the Supreme Court declared Sir Michael Somare to be the legitimate Prime Minister but Prime Minister Peter O'Neill, who had the support of a parliamentary majority, refused to step down. Governor-General Sir Michael Ogio, following the court order, recognised Somare as prime minister. Parliament responded, on 14 December, by "suspending" Ogio and declaring Nape, as Speaker, automatically the acting governor-general. The Queen of Papua New Guinea, Elizabeth II, who appoints parliament's chosen candidate for governor-general, did not revoke Ogio's commission. On 19 December, Ogio was again recognized by Parliament as governor-general and O'Neill as prime minister.

In January 2012, Nape joined Don Polye's new Triumph Heritage Empowerment Rural Party. He lost his seat at the 2012 election. He died of organ failure on 8 July 2016 in Port Moresby.

== Corruption charges ==
In May 2012, the government's corruption watchdog, Investigation Task Force Sweep, drew up a warrant for Nape's arrest in relation to the alleged misappropriation of $2.4 million in development funds, charges which Nape has denied.

Nape was arrested on bribery charges on 7 July 2012 for attempting to bribe a rival candidate to drop out of the running of the 2012 general election. The candidate, who was competing for Nape's Sinasina-Yongumugi seat, alleged that Nape offered him money to drop out of the election. Nape, who has denied all the charges, was released on bail and was due to appear in court after the elections.

National Parliament of Papua New Guinea
Preceded by Bill Skate	Speaker of the National Parliament of Papua New Guinea; 2004–2012	Succeeded by Theo Zurenuoc
Government offices
Preceded by Bill Skate (acting)	Governor General of Papua New Guinea (acting); 2004	Succeeded by Paulias Matane
Preceded by Paulias Matane	Governor General of Papua New Guinea (acting); 2010	Succeeded by Michael Ogio
