= Andrew Mald =

Papua New Guinean politician

The Right Honourable Andrew Mald MP

Minister for Community Development, Religion, and Family Affairs
- In office 8 August 2011 – 9 August 2012
- Prime Minister: Peter O'Neill
- Preceded by: Dame Carol Kidu
- Succeeded by: Loujaya Toni

Member of Parliament for Moresby North East Open
- In office 6 August 2007 – 13 July 2012
- Preceded by: Casper Wollom
- Succeeded by: Labi Amaiu

Personal details
- Party: Independent, then National Alliance Party, then T.H.E. Party

Andrew Mald (born 7 January 1971) is a Papua New Guinean politician.

He was first elected to the National Parliament in the 2007 general election, as independent MP for the Moresby North East Open constituency in the National Capital District, though he later joined the National Alliance Party, and sat as a government backbencher. Nonetheless, according to an editorial in the Post Courier, he was an "outspoken critic of the Government and in particular the National Capital District Commission (NCDC). The issues he [...] raised on the floor of Parliament and in the media [...] impressed a lot of people in the city, and many viewed him as someone who has always had the interests of his voters at heart and concern for the city and its inhabitants".

In July 2010, he and five other party members defected briefly to the Opposition, in a failed attempt to bring down the government. Within a few days, they pledged their support for the government once more, and were accepted back.

At the start of August 2011, he was again among several government MPs to join the Opposition. This time, a successful parliamentary motion of no confidence brought down the government of Acting Prime Minister Sam Abal (standing in for Sir Michael Somare while the latter was hospitalised for a serious heart condition), and Peter O'Neill became prime minister. O'Neill appointed Mald as his Minister for Community Development, Religion, and Family Affairs. He thus succeeded Dame Carol Kidu, who had held those portfolios since 2002. He promised to support a bill she had sponsored, which would lead to the creation of reserved seats for women in Parliament; she herself was, at that time, the only woman MP.

A few days after taking office, and in response to an apparently alcohol-fuelled violent clash between Chimbu and Tari people in Port Moresby, in which one person died, Mald called for "a total ban on liquor sales" in the capital, to last at least ten months in the lead up to the 2012 general election. The Post Courier published an editorial in support of the proposal, stating: "[W]e support the call by Mald that a ban is necessary in the settlements of Port Moresby. Though the ban is only temporary, 10 months is enough time for the NCDC to move decisively to clamp down on liquor abuse and its associated problems that are so widespread throughout the city, not only in settlements but in homes of educated elites and the disciplinary forces. [...] While we understand the argument that the liquor business generates taxes, jobs and profits, must this be done at the expense of peace, order and unity? No, we think not."

In January 2012, he joined Don Polye's new Triumph Heritage Empowerment Rural Party. He was defeated by Labi Amaiu at the 2012 election.
