= Julie Soso =

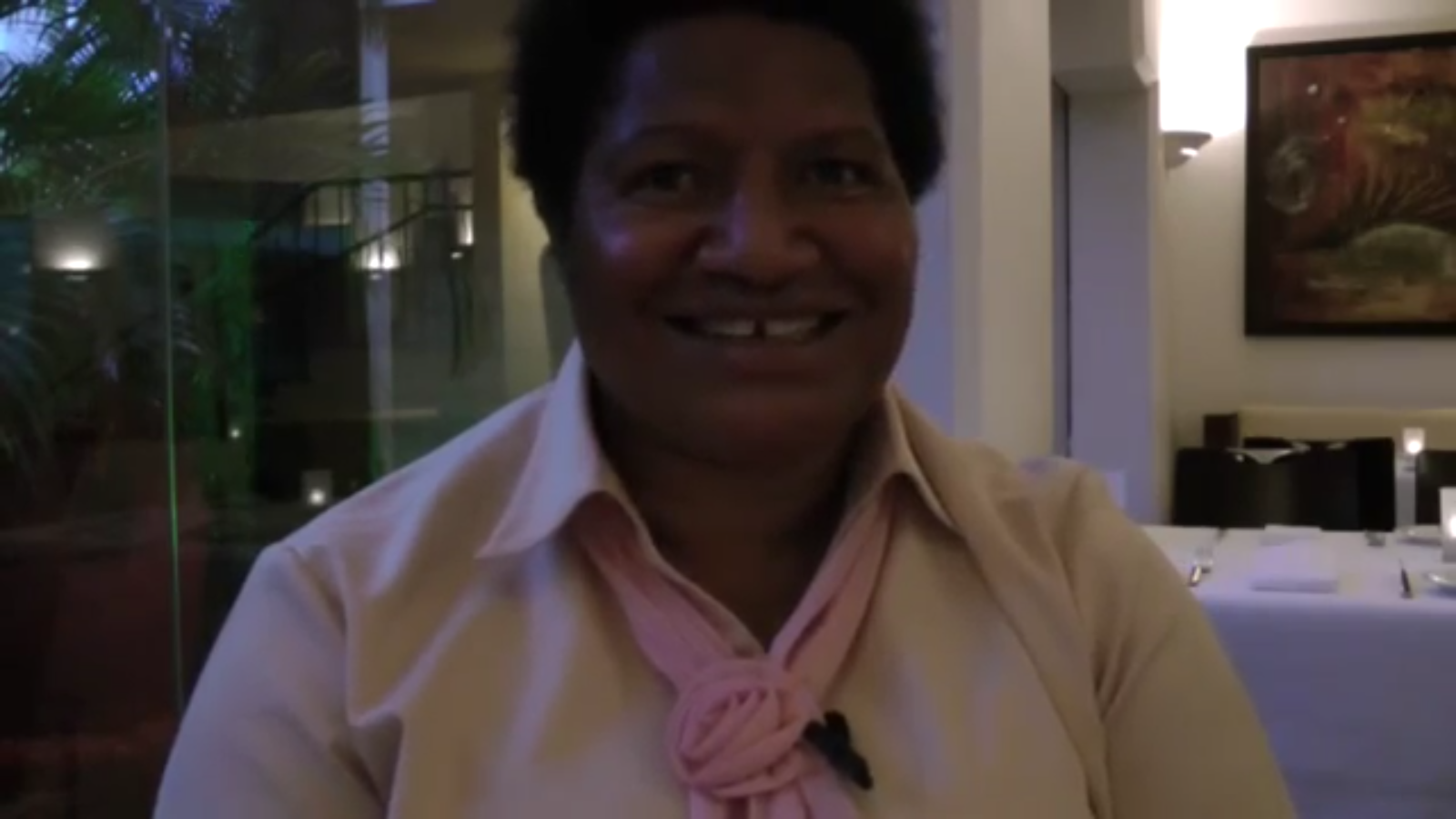
Soso in 2012

Julie Soso Akeke (born 29 August 1960) is a Papua New Guinean politician. She was the Governor of Eastern Highlands Province from 2012 to 2017.

== Background ==
Soso was a broadcaster and women's advocate before entering politics, serving as president of the Eastern Highlands Provincial Council of Women and the deputy chairperson of the district AIDS council. She advocated a ban on firearms and ammunition in Papua New Guinea, called on the provincial government to ban alcohol, and supported reserved seats for women in parliament. She unsuccessfully contested the Eastern Highlands seat at the 1997, 2002 and 2007 elections. A documentary, PNG: The Rules of the Game, was made about her 2007 campaign.

Soso was married to Paul Akeke for more than thirty years. He died in June 2016.

== Election to parliament ==
Soso was elected to the National Parliament at the 2012 election, winning the Eastern Highlands governorship on her fourth attempt. She was the first woman to be elected to parliament from Papua New Guinea's Highlands region. She was elected as a member of the Triumph Heritage Empowerment Party. Former Governor-General Sir Paulias Matane stated that she had "created history as the first female governor and MP in the Highlands region, where politics was dominated and deemed as an art for men only." In her first months in office, she raised concerns around the enforcement of liquor licensing in her province, criticised the national government for poor facilities for treating women with cervical and breast cancers, and joined women colleagues Loujaya Toni and Delilah Gore in threatening to withdraw from the government if a bill introducing reserved seats for women was reintroduced. She credited former MP Louis Ambane with her changed position on reserved seats, stating that he had convinced her that women had to compete equally. In December 2012, she proposed introducing a ban on polygamy.

In 2014, Soso was a member of the Parliamentary Referral Committee on Education, which looked into issues around the payment of teachers' salaries and entitlements, and was widely praised for its investigation. She again revisited her position on reserved seats for women in April 2014, arguing that the bill should be "re-looked at" because "women...throughout the country still say they do not have a voice." In November 2014, her party crossed into Opposition; although she was absent from the initial announcement, she subsequently announced that she would join them in Opposition. In 2014, she initiated the Eastern Highlands Women's Credit Scheme, a women's microfinance scheme. In July 2015, Soso defected back to the government, leaving her party for the People's National Congress.

== Provincial administration issues and defeat ==
In mid-2014, Soso faced substantial criticism for long delays in her appointment of a permanent administrator for the provincial government after she rejected two shortlists of candidates in their entirety. When the National Executive Council attempted to fill the position in late 2014, appointing Solomon Tato, Soso appointed her own candidate, resulting in a standoff as both candidates attempted to take control of the administration building. Soso admitted that major projects had "not been implemented because the provincial administration is in turmoil", but blamed her predecessor as Governor. She also clashed bitterly with some open MPs in the province, most prominently Goroka MP Bire Kimisopa.

In September 2015, the National Court held that Soso's nominee was acting administrator, being that Tato been suspended on misappropriation charges since his appointment. The standoff continued, however, as Tato sought to lift his suspension and resume his duties, resulting in further court hearings, which resulted in the National Court ordering Tato's reinstatement in January 2016. In February 2016, the Supreme Court upheld Tato being restored to office, pending an outcome of an appeal. Soso then wrote to him instructing that he step down, for which the Supreme Court fined her K15,000 for contempt of court. Soso recontested her seat for the People's National Congress at the 2017 election, but was defeated.
