= Matilda Pilacapio =

Papua New Guinean human rights and environmental activist

Matilda Pilacapio is a human rights activist and an environmental rights activist from Papua New Guinea (PNG). A former member of the provincial government of Milne Bay Province, she is particularly known for her campaigns against the oil palm industry. More recently she has been active in the Papua Hahine Social Action Forum, a group campaigning against gender-based violence.

== Activism ==
Matilda Pilacapio comes from Leileiafa in the Milne Bay Province. She worked for the Milne Bay provincial government and for a time served as a board member of PNG's Copra Marketing Board. She first became involved in activism in 2007 when she learned that a logging company wanted to strip the indigenous ebony species from Woodlark Island in Milne Bay Province, with which she had family connections, to make way for an oil palm plantation. Working with Greenpeace, she and others organized successful opposition to the proposal. In 2007 she ran as an Independent candidate for the Alotau Open constituency in the national elections but failed to be elected. In that year, only one woman, Dame Carol Kidu was elected.

Pilacapio then became active in supporting farmers in the Milne Bay Province in opposing the practices of the Cargill corporation regarding oil palm production, which involved the leasing of customary land by the company and the farmers then undertaking production under contract farming arrangements. She argued that this was causing a dependence on unreliable world market prices and that the monocropping involved with oil palm production meant that people were neglecting food crop production. She further argued that people in the Milne Bay Province had signed away their rights to their traditional land without having a clear idea what they were signing and without access to legal advice. Later, she would also raise the issue of pollution from palm oil mills and the impact of carbon trading on people in PNG. In 2009 Pilacapio went to the United States, with support from the Rainforest Action Network to meet with executives of Cargill in Boston and Minneapolis.

In Milne Bay, Pilacapio has led a number of organizations, including the Milne Bay AIDS Council, Milne Bay Women in Agriculture, and the Alotau Women's Association. In 2013 she was a strong supporter of attempts by Julie Soso, the country's first female provincial governor, to introduce a bill to outlaw polygamy, arguing that among other benefits it could reduce the spread of HIV/AIDS in the country. She has also worked with the Papua Hahine Social Action Forum, an organization involved in caring, counselling and providing support for victims of violence, mainly women and children.
