= Sali Subam =

Papua New Guinean politician

Sali Subam (born 30 December 1955) is a Papua New Guinea politician. He was a National Alliance member of the National Parliament of Papua New Guinea from 2007 to 2012, representing the electorate of South Fly Open.

Subam first contested the electorate at the 2002 general election, but lost to People's National Congress candidate Conrad Haoda. He again contested the seat at the 2007 general election and was successful, defeating Haoda on his second attempt. He was appointed Parliamentary Secretary for Foreign Affairs, Trade and Immigration after the election by Prime Minister Michael Somare, but later joined the Opposition.

In August 2011, Peter O'Neill became Prime Minister in the wake of a parliamentary motion of no confidence in the government of Acting Prime Minister Sam Abal (standing in for Somare while the latter was hospitalised for a heart condition). O'Neill appointed Subam as his Minister for Sports.

In January 2012, he joined Don Polye's new Triumph Heritage Empowerment Rural Party.

Subam was defeated by Aide Ganasi at the 2012 election. He successfully challenged his defeat in the National Court in February 2013, with the court ordering a by-election for the seat; however, Ganasi successfully appealed the decision and was reinstated in September.

National Parliament of Papua New Guinea
Preceded by Conrad Haoda	Member for South Fly Open; 2007–2012	Succeeded by Aide Ganasi
