= Tony Aimo =

Papua New Guinean politician

Tony Aimo (born 24 August 1960) is a Papua New Guinean politician. He was a member of the National Parliament of Papua New Guinea from 2002 to 2012 and again from 2012 to 2013, representing the electorate of Ambunti-Drekikir Open. He was Minister for Correctional Services under Michael Somare from 2007 until 2011, although he was stood aside for three months in 2010. A long-time People's Action Party member, he was briefly reported to have joined the Papua New Guinea Party following the fall of the Somare government, only to emerge as a member of Somare's National Alliance Party.

== First term ==
He was first elected to parliament at the 2002 election, representing the People's Action Party. In August 2004, he moved a leadership challenge that replaced Moses Maladina with Brian Pulayasi as PAP leader, resolving to keep the party in government after Maladina's sacking as deputy prime minister. He was a candidate in a long-running battle over a mid-term vacancy for Governor of West Sepik Province, eventually dropping his candidacy in favour of Peter Wararu Waranaka after a series of court battles. He was re-elected for PAP at the 2007 election.

== Minister for Correctional Services ==
In September 2007, Aimo was appointed Minister for Correctional Services as part of Michael Somare's post-election reshuffle. His first year in the role saw refurbishment work on five prisons, reviving of promotion within the correctional services department, the implementation of an equal opportunity policy, and recruiting more than 200 warders. He was the cause of some controversy when, on a trip to open a refurbished jail in Madang, he refused to pay a hotel minibar bill and swore at hotel and airport staff in a drunken outburst.

He was temporarily stripped of his portfolio in January 2010 after a major prison escape at the maximum-security Bomana prison in Port Moresby, while remaining in Cabinet as minister without portfolio. Aimo publicly blamed the broader government for the breakout, claiming that security had been compromised due to "insufficient funding for manpower and upgrades", and suggested that Papua New Guinea's prisons were outdated and needed to be replaced to meet modern requirements. However, he was reinstated to his portfolio by April.

In June 2010, Aimo was one of three politicians accused in court by an alleged bank robber as having benefited from the refinery of a gold robbery, in claims which he slammed as "malicious and unfounded"; the allegations were again repeated in court the next year. In August 2010, he publicly floated the notion of recruiting an expatriate to head the country's prison system, which received cautious praise from the Port Moresby Chamber of Commerce; however, after heavy criticism from the Public Employees Association, he declared it was "just an idea".

== Defeat, reinstatement, unseating and second defeat ==
Aimo was reported to have been one of 48 MPs to defect from the government and elect Opposition Leader Peter O'Neill as prime minister in August 2011. In October, he and three other PAP MPs defected to the Papua New Guinea Party, a member of the new governing coalition. However, after ousted prime minister Somare, who was contesting his removal in court, appointed Aimo to his alternative ministry, he publicly called on the Australian government not to recognise O'Neill, declaring him an "illegal Prime Minister" who "repeatedly thumbs his nose at the highest court".

He contested the 2012 election for Somare's National Alliance Party, but was defeated by newcomer Ezekiel Anisi. He filed an election petition challenging the result two weeks later, alleging that Anisi was under the constitutional minimum age of 25 and that his name was not on the Common Roll. In October, the National Court upheld Aimo's petition, declared Anisi's election null and void, and declared Aimo duly elected. He took his seat in late October, sitting as a National Alliance MP. However, Anisi appealed to the Supreme Court, which in July 2013 ruled in Anisi's favour, finding Aimo not duly elected, and declaring a by-election in the seat. Anisi won the by-election in December 2013, with Aimo also beaten for second place.

He is contesting the 2017 general election for the National Party.

National Parliament of Papua New Guinea
Preceded by Judah Akesim	Member for Ambunti-Dreikikir Open; 2002–2012	Succeeded by Ezekiel Anisi
Preceded by Ezekiel Anisi	Member for Ambunti-Dreikikir Open; 2012–2013	Succeeded by Ezekiel Anisi
