= Koni Iguan =

Papua New Guinea politician

Koni Iguan (born 6 June 1969) is a Papua New Guinea politician. He has been a Pangu Party member of the National Parliament of Papua New Guinea since 2017, representing the Markham Open electorate. He formerly held the same seat from 2007 to 2012.

He was first elected in the 2007 general election.

In January 2010, he called the 2010 Papua New Guinea bus crash "the most horrific accident" ever witnessed and described it as "This is the nastiest and bloodiest of accidents on the highway".

He was defeated at the 2012 election, but won back his old seat as a Pangu Party candidate at the 2017 election.

National Parliament of Papua New Guinea
Preceded by Andrew Baing	Member for Markham Open; 2007-2012	Succeeded by Paul Isikiel
Preceded by Paul Isikiel	Member for Markham Open; 2017-present	Incumbent
