= Luke Sela =

Papua New Guinea journalist

Luke Clement Sela, OBE (died 6 June 2007) was a journalist and newspaper editor from Papua New Guinea. He served as editor of the Papua New Guinea Post-Courier newspaper, one of PNG's largest publications, from 1978 to 1992, and was described by the newspaper as a champion of the free press in the country.

== Career ==
Sela worked in the Papua information services in the 1960s and 1970s. He was a journalist at the radio stations Radio Wewak and ABC Australia. He joined the staff of the Post-Courier in 1976 and became the editor in 1978, the newspaper's first national editor. He remained editor until 1992, and retired in 2000, but continued to work with the Post-Courier after his retirement. He was preparing to help coordinate the newspaper's coverage of the 2007 elections in PNG's island regions at the time of his death.

== Personal life ==
Sela was married to Nia; they had two children.

Sela died on 6 June 2007, at Lorengau General Hospital in his home province of Manus, at the age of 64.

== Awards and honours ==
He was awarded the OBE in 1986 for services to journalism. In 2000, the headquarters of the Post-Courier was named Sela Haus in his honour. In 2020, he was the subject of a commemorative stamp.
