= List of newspapers in Papua New Guinea =

This is a list of newspapers in Papua New Guinea.

- The National
- Papua New Guinea Post-Courier
- Wantok Niuspepa
- The Independent (defunct)
- The Papuan Villager (defunct)

== See also ==
- Communications in Papua New Guinea
- Lists of newspapers
