= Benjamin Mul =

Papua New Guinea Politician

Benjamin Ngents Mul (born 26 June 1969) is a Papua New Guinea politician. He was a member of the National Parliament of Papua New Guinea from 2007 to 2012 and had been re-elected in 2022, representing the electorate of North Wahgi Open.

Mul was born in the village of Kaming in Nondugl in the Western Highlands. He dropped out of school at an early age, before renewing his studies at Pabrabug High School in his late teens. He subsequently gained admission to the University of Papua New Guinea through their adult matriculation program, graduating with a Bachelor of Arts, majoring in social work. Mul, a devout Christian, later worked as a teacher, opening a number of Christian pre-schools in the National Capital District and Central Province.

Mul nominated as a candidate for the North Wahgi Open electorate at the 2007 general election, and was not considered a favourite, with incumbent MP and National Party leader Michael Mas Kal and former MP Dr Fabian Pok considered the likely frontrunners. However, he overtook both Kal and Pok in the late stages of counting to stage an upset victory. The result enraged some of Pok's supporters, who retaliated by rioting and starting fires. Pok subsequently filed a petition challenging the result with the Court of Disputed Returns. One of Mul's first acts as an MP was to call for ten percent of the provincial budget to be given to churches in the area.

In January 2012, he joined Don Polye's new Triumph Heritage Empowerment Rural Party, which stated that its focus was to "try to restore Christian values" in politics.

On 4 July 2012, he was arrested for allegedly distributing cash to voters near a polling booth, and for possessing an unlicensed firearm.

He was defeated by former MP Pok at the 2012 election.
