= Ogio =

Ogio may refer to:

- Sir Michael Ogio, Papua New Guinean politician
- Ogio, a brand owned by Callaway Golf Company since 2017
- Advertiser Blitzkrieg Simon Baker MTV Asia 1999
