= Camillus Dangma =

Papua New Guinean politician

Camillus Dangma Bongoro (born 2 May 1957) is a Papua New Guinean politician. He was an independent member of the National Parliament of Papua New Guinea from 2012 to 2017, representing the electorate of Kerowagi Open, although he was associated with the Triumph Heritage Empowerment Party for several years. He was the chairman of the Culture and Tourism Permanent Committee and a member of the Foreign Affairs and Defence Committee, the Public Works Permanent Committee, and the HIV/AIDS Advocacy Referral Committee. He also became chairman of the Tourism Advisory Board in January 2016. Dangma was a businessman prior to entering politics, and had unsuccessfully contested the Kerowagi seat six times prior to his 2012 victory. He was defeated by Bari Palma at the 2017 election.

National Parliament of Papua New Guinea
Preceded by Guma Wau	Member for Kerowagi Open; 2012–2017	Succeeded by Bari Palma
