= Loujaya Kouza =

Papua New Guinean politician, poet and singer (born 1966)

The Honourable Loujaya Kouza MP

Minister for Community Development, Religion and Family Affairs
- In office 9 August 2012 – 10 August 2014
- Prime Minister: Peter O'Neill
- Succeeded by: Delilah Gore

Member of Parliament for Lae Open
- Incumbent
- Assumed office 13 July 2012
- Preceded by: Bart Philemon

Personal details
- Party: Triumph Heritage Empowerment Party

Loujaya Kouza (born 20 July 1966) is a Papua New Guinean politician, poet and singer. She was known under her married name of Loujaya Toni when elected, but reverted to her maiden name in 2013 after divorcing her husband.

== Biography ==
She was born in Lae. Poems which she wrote as a schoolgirl were published by the Education Department, earning her a description as "PNG's youngest poet". In 1985, under the name Loujaya Dunar, "she launched a string of solo gospel music albums", beginning a career as a singer / songwriter. Most notably, she wrote the song "Keep the Fire Alive" and performed it with the group Tambaran Culture at the 1991 South Pacific Games in Port Moresby. A qualified journalist, she has also taught as a part-time tutor at the University of Technology in Lae.

She stood unsuccessfully for election to the National Parliament in the 2007 general election. After a master's degree in communications in 2012, she stood again, in the general election that same year. Representing the Indigenous People's Party, she stood in the constituency of Lae, the capital of Morobe Province and the second largest city in the country, against the incumbent MP: her uncle Bart Philemon, veteran politician, outgoing Minister for Public Service, previously Minister for Finance and "widely respected economic reformer". She defeated him and won the seat, as one of the only three women elected to Parliament that year (with Delilah Gore and Julie Soso), out of 111 MPs. Despite being a first time MP, she was appointed Minister for Community Development, Religion and Family Affairs by Prime Minister Peter O'Neill, and joined his People's National Congress Party after the election.

In December 2013, she controversially supported the actions of Parliament's Speaker Theo Zurenuoc, who had "removed and badly damaged" several carvings adorning the interior of Parliament and representing Papua New Guinea's diverse indigenous cultures. Zurenuoc considered the carvings to be contrary to Christianity. Toni, speaking up in support of the destruction, indicated it had been carried out on advice from an Israeli Christian evangelical movement, whom she had met. Stating that the carvings represented "idol gods", she added: "The Government declares that the God of Israel is the God of PNG. […] I thank God for the Speaker Theodore Zurenuoc for the cleansing of the House". Prime Minister O'Neill condemned the destruction, ordered it stopped, and publicly denied Toni's claim that it had been authorised by Cabinet: "There is no truth in that. Cabinet didn’t give approval for anything to be removed from the National Parliament. The Minister has no authority to speak for Cabinet".

In August 2014, Toni resigned from the government to serve as interim chair of the Lae City Commission. She was replaced as Minister for Community Development by Delilah Gore.
