= Paru Aihi =

Papua New Guinean politician

Paru Aihi MP

Member of the National Parliament of Papua New Guinea
- In office 2007–2012
- Preceded by: Moi Avei
- Succeeded by: Peter Isoaimo
- Constituency: Kairuku-Hiri Open

Personal details
- Party: People's National Congress (2012-2014); National Alliance Party (2010-2012); Papua New Guinea Party (2007-2010); People's Labour Party (2002)
- Occupation: Businessman

Paru Aihi (born 11 January 1957) is a former Papua New Guinean politician. He was a member of the National Parliament of Papua New Guinea from 2007 to 2012, representing the electorate of Kairuku-Hiri Open. He was Minister for Higher Education, Science, Technology and Research under Michael Somare from March to August 2011 and Minister for Education under Peter O'Neill from August to December 2012.

Aihi is from Hsiu village in Central Province, and was a banker and businessman prior to entering politics. He had been the head of a bank lending department before resigning in 1995 to start his own firm, security company Delstars Security Services. He unsuccessfully contested the Kairuku-Hiri Open seat at the 2002 election for the People's Labour Party, losing to incumbent MP Sir Moi Avei. Aihi challenged the result in the National Court, but his petition was dismissed in March 2004.

He was elected in Kairuku-Hiri Open at the 2007 election for the Papua New Guinea Party, winning a rematch with Avei. He was an outspoken member of the opposition under Mekere Morauta, but in September 2010 defected to the government, joining Prime Minister Michael Somare's National Alliance Party. He was one of four defecting MPs who withdrew their support for a proposed no-confidence motion against Somare in November, preserving his government.

In March 2011, he was appointed Minister for Higher Education, Science, Technology and Research by Prime Minister Somare, serving until Somare's ouster by Peter O'Neill in August. He also rose to become southern region leader of the National Alliance Party. However, in February 2012, he again switched parties, joining O'Neill's governing People's National Congress. The defection, only nine weeks before the issue of writs for the 2012 election, resulted in media criticism from constituents.

He was re-elected for the People's National Congress in July 2012. He was then appointed Minister for Education when O'Neill conducted a post-election Cabinet reshuffle in August. However, in December 2012, Aihi was unseated by the Court of Disputed Returns after the court upheld an allegation that he had committed bribery during the 2012 election, over payments of K6500 cash to a number of voters in the village of Veifa'a. The court ordered a by-election in Kairuku-Hiri Open. Aihi challenged his unseating in the Supreme Court, which rejected his appeal in October. The by-election was held in February 2014, at which Aihi was defeated by National Alliance Party candidate Peter Isoaimo, who had been the successful petitioner in the court decision. Aihi unsuccessfully challenged the by-election result in court in July 2014, and lost a subsequent appeal to the Supreme Court in June 2015.

After his by-election defeat, Aihi remained the chairman of the nationwide District Schools Survey Taskforce, which he had established while Minister for Education.

National Parliament of Papua New Guinea
| Preceded by Moi Avei | Member for Kairuku-Hiri Open; 2007–2012 | Succeeded by Peter Isoaimo |
