= Alex Anisi =

Papua New Guinean politician (died 2012)

Alex Anisi (died 18 February 2012) was a Papua New Guinean politician. He was Premier of East Sepik Province from June 1993 to August 1995, and subsequently served as secretary-general of the People's Progress Party for two parliamentary terms until 2011. He was a candidate for the National Parliament at the 2012 election when he died suddenly during the campaign. His son, Ezekiel Anisi, subsequently entered politics himself.
