= Paulias Matane =

8th governor-general of Papua New Guinea (1931–2021)

The Right Honourable Sir Paulias Matane GCL GCMG OBE KStJ
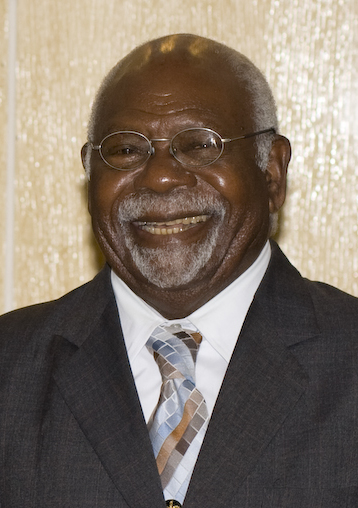
- Matane at Government House, Port Moresby in 2009

8th Governor-General of Papua New Guinea
- In office 29 June 2004 – 13 December 2010
- Monarch: Elizabeth II
- Prime Minister: Michael Somare
- Preceded by: Jeffrey Nape (acting)
- Succeeded by: Jeffrey Nape (acting)

Personal details
- Born: 21 September 1931 East New Britain, New Guinea
- Died: 12 December 2021 (aged 90) East New Britain, Papua New Guinea
- Spouse: Kaludia Matane

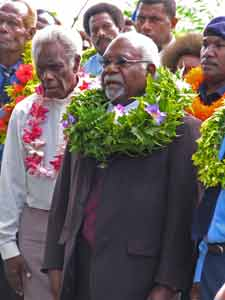
Matane at the Ramoaaina NT Dedication at Molot Village, Duke of York Island

Sir Paulias Nguna Matane GCL GCMG OBE KStJ (21 September 1931 – 12 December 2021) was a Papua New Guinean politician who served as the eighth Governor-General of Papua New Guinea from 29 June 2004 to 13 December 2010. His memoir My Childhood in New Guinea has been on the school curriculum since the 1970s. He was a long-time contributor and columnist for The National.

== Biography ==
=== Personal life ===
Matane was born on 21 September 1931 in Viviran village, Vunadidir-Toma Rural LLG, East New Britain Province. He was a Tolai, a native speaker of Kuanua, and a staunch United Churchman. He wrote 44 books which deliberately use extremely simple English, focusing in part on his own overseas travels, including three on the State of Israel. His writing is intended to persuade Papua New Guineans that books are a useful source of information and that they should not regard them as something only for foreigners.

For many years Matane wrote a column in the Malaysian Chinese-owned newspaper The National, containing advice for the younger generation. He also founded the United News Agency of Melanesia. He, together with Grand Chief the Right Honourable Michael Somare, made a point of wearing a lap-lap (skirt) rather than trousers.

He was married to Lady Kaludia Matane who served her country with "great distinction" and died on 20 December 2016.

=== Education and early career ===
Matane attended Toma Village Higher (later Tauran Primary) School and then Keravat High School. Beginning in 1956 he studied at Sogeri Teachers' College and from 1963 he attended Port Moresby Teachers' College and Mendi for Inspector’s Theoretical and Practical Training. At the end of his training he worked as an inspector of schools.

=== Ambassador to the United States and United Nations ===
Matane served as the first Papua New Guinean Ambassador to the United States in the years 1975–76 following the establishment of diplomatic relations between the two countries. He was also PNG's Ambassador to the United Nations from 1975 and in 1979 was elected as a vice-president of the General Assembly.

He was appointed a Companion of the Order of St Michael and St George (CMG) in the 1980 Birthday Honours.

In the mid-1980s he was Secretary of Papua New Guinea's Foreign Affairs Department and led delegations to Australia to discuss that country's foreign aid to PNG and negotiated with Indonesia regarding border incursions and refugee problems.

=== Governor-General ===
Matane was elected Governor-General by Parliament on 27 May 2004, receiving 50 votes, while his opponent, Sir Pato Kakaraya received 46 votes. Attempts to elect a Governor-General had failed repeatedly for six months before Matane's election because of constitutional flaws in the nomination process. Following Matane's election, Kakaraya brought a petition to the Supreme Court of Papua New Guinea, seeking to invalidate the election.

Matane was sworn in on 29 June 2004, although the legal challenge to his election was still ongoing. He was officially invested as Governor-General by Queen Elizabeth II on 13 October 2004. He was reappointed for a second term in June 2010, under what The National called "very controversial circumstances [...], in an act likely to be challenged in court". Specifically, The National reported that there was "conflicting advice from the speaker and the prime minister" regarding the proper procedure for the appointment, and that the government had Matane reappointed by "using section 87(5) of the Constitution, arguing that the absolute majority secured for Sir Paulias meant that the exhaustive secret ballot vote was not required". The Supreme Court of Papua New Guinea ruled Matane's reelection unconstitutional in December 2010.

=== Death ===
Matane died on 12 December 2021, in his native village of Viviran.

== Books written by Paulias Matane ==
- Kum Tumun of Minj, Melbourne: Oxford University Press, 1966 (Stories of Our People).
- What Good is Business? Here are Some Answers, Madang: Kristen Pres [1972].
- Aimbe, the Challenger, Port Moresy: Niugini Press, 1974.
- Aimbe, the School Drop-out, Rabaul: Toksave na Buk Dipatmen, United Church, New Guinea Islands Region, 1977.
- Aimbe, the Magician, New York: Vantage Press, 1978.
- Aimbe, the Pastor: A Novel, Hicksville, New York: Exposition Press, 1979.
- Two Papua New Guineans Discover the Bible Lands, Rabaul: Trinity Press, 1987.
- To Serve With Love, Mount Waverley, Victoria: Dellasta Pacific, 1992.
- Let's Do It PNG! Inspirational Messages, Mount Waverley, Victoria: Dellasta Pacific, 1994.
- Trekking Through the New Worlds, New Delhi: UBS Publishers' Distributors Ltd., 1995.
- My Childhood in New Guinea, Melbourne: Oxford University Press, 1996.
- 40th Anniversary: Amazing Discoveries in 40 Years of Marriage, Port Moresby: Sir Paulias Matane, 1996.
- Chit-Chat, South Melbourne: Addison Wesley Longman, 1996.
- Pawa na pipel! People and Power in Papua New Guinea, Woollahra, N.S.W.: Aid/Watch, [1996].
- Laughter Made in PNG, New Delhi: UBSPD, 1997.
- Voyage to Antarctica, New Delhi: UBSPD, 1997.
- The Other Side of Port Moresby in pictures, New Delhi: UBSPD, 1998.
- A Trip of a Lifetime, Boroko: Sir Paulias Matane, 1998.
- Management Problems in PNG: Some Solutions, New Delhi: UBSPD, 2000.
- Management for Excellence, New Delhi: UBSPD, 2001.
- Ripples in the South Pacific Ocean, New Delhi: CBS Publishers & Distributors, 2003.
- Time Traveller: A Journey Through the Heart of Papua New Guinea, Port Moresby: Cassowary Books, 2005.
- Papua New Guinea: Land of Natural Beauty and Cultural Diversity, New Delhi: CBS Publishers & Distributors, 2005.
- Laughter: Its Concept and Papua New Guineans, New Delhi: CBS, 2007.
- Understanding Papua New Guinea, New Delhi: Scientific International, 2013. Joint author: M. L. Ahuja.
- Books for National Development, New Delhi: MEDTEC, an imprint of Scientific International Pvt. Ltd., [2013]. Joint author: M. L. Ahuja.
- Christianity: Faith and Holy Days, New Delhi: MEDTEC, an imprint of Scientific International Pvt. Ltd., 2014. Joint author: M. L. Ahuja.

Government offices
Preceded by Jeffery Nape (acting)	Governor-General of Papua New Guinea; 2004–2010	Succeeded by Jeffery Nape (acting)
