= Nixon Mangape =

Papua New Guinean politician

Nixon Koeka Mangape (born 16 September 1962) is a Papua New Guinean politician. He was a member of the National Parliament of Papua New Guinea from 2012 to 2017, representing the electorate of Lagaip-Porgera Open.

Mangape was a Porgera landowner and the chairman of the Porgera Development Authority before entering politics. Under his chairmanship, the authority provided roads, schools, health centres, airstrips and sports facilities in the Porgera Valley. Prominent in discussions surrounding the Porgera Gold Mine, he demanded a review of the mine agreement and a Commission of Inquiry into the killing of more than 20 people within the Special Mining Lease, and repeatedly supported calls for a state of emergency and further police assistance in the area following law and order concerns. He was also the chairman of two landowner companies, Kupiane Yuu Anduane Company and Kupiane Investment Limited. In August 2010, Mangape was shot by Barrick Gold's private security guards, subsequently receiving treatment for pellet wounds to the back.

Mangape was elected to the National Parliament as an independent at the 2012 election. He claimed upon his election that more than K100 million of project grants for his electorate had "gone missing" in the previous five years. He stated that his first priority was to create a five-year plan for the electorate, while raising the review of the mining agreement, outstanding commitments under its memorandum of understanding and law and order problems as major issues. He supported the introduction of the death penalty, claiming that the government's failure to do so was responsible for an increase in violent crime. In May 2013, he advocated ending "Fly-in fly-out" employment in favour of building "decent townships in mining areas". He raised concerns about severe environmental damage stemming from the mine on a number of occasions, calling for a state of emergency to rectify the damage. Mangape supported Barrick Gold's Restoring Justice Initiative, a partnership between business, government and community to address the area's law and order issues.

Mangape supported the Mt Kare gold project in his electorate, calling for landowner groups to unite behind the project. In February 2014, he announced that alcohol would be banned in the district. He was a strong supporter of the Porgera-Tari road project, suggesting that was important for the area's economic life after the eventual close of the mine. In August 2014, he called for independent monitoring of toxic waste levels around the mine, and stated that "if the developer believes the waster levels are acceptable", they should "eat some fish from the river." He stated that the developer "should bear the blame for the loss of lives and other diseases unknown to the people that lived in that isolated parts of the country that have lived happily with their environment for years before the mine."

In November 2014, Mangape crossed from the government to the opposition along with ally and dumped former Treasurer Don Polye. In February 2015, he called for Papua New Guinea's "royalty and equity" system of regulating resources to be replaced with a "production sharing contract", involving a 50-50 share between landowners and developers. In the same month, he was named Shadow Minister for Commerce and Trade, Pacific Games, Petroleum and Energy under opposition leader Polye. In October 2016, Mangape claimed that he had been offered and rejected a bribe of US$1.5 million to rejoin the government prior to a no-confidence vote that July. He came third at the 2017 election as a candidate of Polye's Triumph Heritage Empowerment Party, behind the winner Tomait Kapili his predecessor Philip Kikala (2nd)

National Parliament of Papua New Guinea
Preceded by Philip Kikala	Member for Lagaip-Porgera Open; 2012–present	Incumbent
