= Steven Pirika Kama =

Steven Pirika Kama (1962/63 – February 20, 2016) was a Papua New Guinean politician who represented the South Bougainville constituency in the National Parliament of Papua New Guinea. Kama was a sitting member of the national parliament, as well as the Minister Assisting the Prime Minister on Constitutional Matters, at the time of his death in February 2016. He had previously served as the national Minister for Bougainville Affairs.

Kama, a member of the United Resource Party within the coalition government, joined the national Parliament in 2008, representing the South Bougainville constituency of the Autonomous Region of Bougainville. He was appointed Minister of Bougainville Affairs until 2016. In early 2016, Kama was reassigned as Minister Assisting the Prime Minister on Constitutional Matters as part of a cabinet reshuffle from Prime Minister Peter O'Neill.

Kama died while undergoing medical treatment at a hospital in Manila, Philippines, on February 20, 2016 at the age of 54, following a long-term illness. He was the third sitting member of the National Parliament to die in office in recent years, following the deaths of Angoram MP Ludwig Schulze, who died in 2013, and Goilala MP Daniel Mona in 2015.
