= Ron Ganarafo =

Ron Ganinbo Ganarafo (born 20 April 1955) is a Papua New Guinean politician. He was a member of the National Parliament of Papua New Guinea from 1997 to 2002 and from 2012 to 2017, both times representing the electorate of Daulo Open. He was Vice-Minister for Finance (1997) and Vice-Minister for Overseas Development Assistance (1997–1998) in the Skate government and Minister for Fisheries (1999–2002) in the Morauta government.

== Education and business career ==
Ganarafo was educated at Omboran Primary School, Amaiyufa Primary School, and Goroka High School before studying a Bachelor of Economics at the University of Papua New Guinea, graduating in 1977. He was the chief executive officer of Coffee Industry Corporation Limited, the Papua New Guinean coffee industry regulator and advocate, from 1988 to 1997.

== First term (1997–2002) ==
He was first elected to the National Parliament at the 1997 election, representing the Pangu Party, although he would later switch to the People's Democratic Movement. Bill Skate, the new Prime Minister, appointed Ganarafo Vice-Minister for Finance from July to December 1997, when he was shifted to Vice-Minister for Overseas Development Assistance. The National Court quashed his election on 7 May 1998 and declared him to have not been duly elected due to an incident where an electoral officer was alleged to have illegally used an unauthorised list provided by Ganarafo's campaign coordinator. The National Court ordered a by-election, but Ganarafo successfully appealed to the Supreme Court, which ruled on 5 October 1998 that there had been no illegality and reinstated him.

Ganarafo was promoted to the ministry as Minister for Fisheries in July 1999, following Mekere Morauta's ascension to Prime Minister. As minister, he signed a fishing agreement with South Korea, renewed a previously suspended agreement with Taiwan, restated Papua New Guinea's opposition to Japanese whaling, and brought Papua New Guinea into the Convention on the Conservation and Management of Highly Migratory Fish Stocks in the Western and Central Pacific Ocean. He lost his seat to Ben Kiagi at the 2002 election.

== Second term (2012–present) ==
Ganarafo won back his old seat as an independent at the 2012 election, having reportedly been a fruit and vegetable farmer in his years out of office. In November 2012, he called for restrictions on the importing of fresh vegetables, calling the importing of subsidised vegetables from Australia and New Zealand a "disturbing trend".

Ganarafo was defeated by Pogio Ghate at the 2017 election.

National Parliament of Papua New Guinea
Preceded by Sowa Gunia	Member for Daulo Open; 1997–2002	Succeeded by Ben Kiagi
Preceded by Kondo Patrick	Member for Daulo Open; 2012–2017	Succeeded by Pogio Ghate
