= People's United Assembly =

- Leader: Ati Wobiro
- President: Raymond Kuai
- Secretary: Benjamin Gawi
- Founded: March 2012
- National Parliament: 0 / 111

The People's United Assembly is a political party in Papua New Guinea.

It was formed in March 2012 by six sitting MPs, including Southern Highlands Governor Anderson Agiru, Pomio MP Paul Tiensten, Middle Rami MP Ben Semri, Kagua Erave MP James Lagea, and two others, with a ten-point policy platform. Agiru was selected as the leader of the new party. One such policy was the increased decentralisation of power away from Port Moresby, empowering district authorities and local level authorities. It was officially registered in May 2012, becoming the last new party to be registered in time for the 2012 election.

The party was loyal to ousted National Alliance Prime Minister Michael Somare during the election, labelling him the legitimate Prime Minister. Somare pledged to work with them and was the keynote speaker at a campaign event. Three MPs were returned under their banner: Agiru, Tiensten, and new candidate Ati Wobiro (Western Provincial); Lagea was also returned, variously reported as an independent or for the party. Following the clear victory of Prime Minister Peter O'Neill at the election, they pledged support to his government, citing a desire for stability.

Tiensten was sentenced to nine years in jail for misappropriation in March 2014. In October 2014, Lagea defected to the People's National Congress. Agiru died in April 2016. Wobiro was sentenced to ten years in jail for misappropriation in November 2016.
