= People's Movement for Change =

- Leader: Gary Juffa
- President: Rawali Bokuik
- Secretary: Rodrick Kanama
- Ideology: Nationalism; Anti-imperialism
- National Parliament: 1 / 118

People's Movement for Change is a political party in Papua New Guinea.

It first contested the 2012 election, at which it won two seats: leader and former IRC commissioner Gary Juffa as Governor of Oro Province and former Port Moresby Rugby Football League chairman Labi Amaiu in Moresby Northeast Open.

Amaiu crossed to the People's National Congress in January 2013, leaving Juffa as the party's sole member of parliament. Amaiu stated that he valued his former party and still had confidence in Juffa, but that he believed his people would benefit from the leadership of Prime Minister Peter O'Neill.

In February 2015, the party was moved from the government benches to the opposition benches by Leader of Government Business James Marape for Juffa's outspoken criticism of government policies and announcements, particularly in relation to logging and landowner issues. The party officially joined the opposition in October 2015 in protest at claimed non-fulfilment of promises by the O'Neill government.

In May 2016, Juffa publicly condemned the deal between the Papua New Guinean and Australian governments regarding the Manus Regional Processing Centre. He stated that the day the agreement was signed was "the lowest point...in PNG's time as an independent nation" and that PNG's sovereignty had been "prostituted". He further described the relationship between Papua New Guinea and Australia as "neo-colonialist grovelling".

As of May 2019, the party had one seat in the National Parliament, with Juffa as its sole MP.
