= Peter Wararu Waranaka =

Peter Wararu Waranaka is a Papua New Guinean politician. In 2004 he was elected Member of Parliament for Yangoru-Saussia for the National Alliance Party and was appointed the Governor of East Sepik. The National Court had initially nullified Waranaka's election, after it was contested by Gabriel Dusava, but his victory was later confirmed.

In October 2011, Waranaka tabled a Special Submission to the Supreme Court of PNG, challenging the legitimacy of Prime Minister Peter O'Neill's administration, which was formed on 2 August 2011.

The Supreme Court dismissed Waranaka's submission in October 2011.

== Controversies ==
In 2005, the politician Gabriel Dusava challenged the appointment of Waranaka as Member of Parliament for Yangoru-Saussia. In the complaint lodged with the National Court, Dusava alleged that Wararu, his supporters and the Electoral Commission, had engaged in bribery and exerted undue influence ahead of Waranaka's election. The case was brought before the Supreme Court, but Dusava withdrew the matter in July 2005 on the grounds that the delay in a decision would have an adverse impact on the population of Yangoru Saussia.

In 2007, Wararu lodged a police complaint against a Peter Kendino, after an alleged attack on Waranaka on the Sepik Highway. However, Police Superintendent Dominic Kakas called upon Waranaka for questioning in September 2011, after Kendino lodged separate allegations against Waranaka, for attempted murder and theft.

Michael Somare Junior, the son of Sir Michael Somare was arrested in December 2010, for the attempted murder of Peter Waranaka. Sir Michael offered Waranaka's family PGK20,000 and two pigs by way of compensation, but the relatives of Waranaka demanded PGK5 million. Waranaka stated that the attack would not affect his membership to the National Alliance party.

In April 2011, police were prevented from arresting Waranaka when an angry mob of villagers from his electorate assaulted the policemen and rendered one police officer unconscious. Acting Police Commissioner Anthony Wagambie stated that they were "investigating allegations against the Governor". The villagers stated that the arrest of Waranaka would result in the cessation of work on a vital road project from Tangori to other isolated villages in the Numbo and East Yangoru.
