= Wantok Niuspepa =

- Niuspepa Bilong Yumi Ol Papua Niugini Stret
- Type: Weekly newspaper
- Owner: Word Publishing
- Founder: Francis Mihalic
- Founded: August 5, 1970
- Language: Tok Pisin
- Headquarters: Boroko, Port Moresby
- Country: Papua New Guinea
- Website: wantokniuspepa.com

Wantok Niuspepa (Wantok Newspaper) is a weekly newspaper in Papua New Guinea. It is the only Tok Pisin-language newspaper in Papua New Guinea, and is distributed throughout the country. It was first published on 5 August 1970 from an office in Wewak with Father Francis Mihalic, a member of the Society of the Divine Word order, as its editor; while the project had first been initiated by Catholic bishops, it subsequently received limited support thereafter. It moved to Port Moresby in 1976. It is now operated by the Word Publishing Company.

== See also ==
- List of newspapers in Papua New Guinea
