= Bart Philemon =

Bartholomew "Bart" Philemon (born 16 April 1945, in a Butibam village near Lae) is a Papua New Guinean politician.

He was educated in a Lutheran missionary primary school in Lae. He received a grant from the Lutheran Church to attend St. Peter's Lutheran College in Brisbane Queensland. After a Bachelor of Arts degree at the University of Papua New Guinea, he worked in the aviation industry, holding the position of assistant general manager of Air Niugini (the country's national airline) from 1973 to 1980. From 1982 to 1986, he served as chairman of the National Airlines Commission. He also worked as "a businessman in the poultry and fruit industries". He chaired the South Pacific Festival of Arts in 1980, and the South Pacific Games Foundation for the 1991 South Pacific Games, held in Port Moresby.

He first entered politics in his native Morobe Province, being elected to the Morobe Provincial Assembly from 1984 to 1988. In the 1992 general election, he was elected as MP for Lae to the National Parliament, a seat he was to hold for twenty years. He served in the Shadow Cabinet, until in 1994 Julius Chan ousted Prime Minister Paias Wingti through a motion of no confidence in Parliament. Chan appointed Philemon as his Minister for Public Service. Philemon held his seat in the 1997 election, but was back on the Opposition front benches, the Chan government having been defeated. Two years later Mekere Morauta became prime minister, with Philemon as his Minister for Transport & Civil Aviation. In January 2001, Morauta made him Minister for Foreign Affairs, and Minister for Bougainville Affairs, in charge of relations with the Autonomous Bougainville Government following the civil war on Bougainville Island. In May, however, he lost his position in government during a Cabinet reshuffle. He later said Morauta had sacked him for giving unwanted advice. He returned to Cabinet following the 2002 general election, serving as Minister of Finance under Prime Minister Sir Michael Somare. During his term as Minister for Finance, economic growth was restored, earning him "wide respect" for his economic reforms. Nonetheless, he struggled to "control the profligate tendencies of other ministers", and his attempts to do so resulted in him being sacked in 2006.

He founded his own New Generation Party and, alongside Mekere Morauta, became a leading figure of the Opposition. Somare won the 2007 general election, retaining power, and Philemon remained deputy Leader of the Opposition. In August 2011, Peter O'Neill formed a majority in Parliament to take power while Somare was in hospital outside the country. O'Neill appointed Philemon as his Minister for Public Service and Sport.

In the 2012 general election, Bart Philemon lost his seat in Parliament to his niece Loujaya Toni.

National Parliament of Papua New Guinea
Preceded by Toni Ila	Member for Lae Open; 1992-2012	Succeeded by Loujaya Kouza
