= Labi Amaiu =

Papua New Guinean politician

- Born: 27 November 1974 (age 51)
- Occupation: politician

Labi Amaiu (born 27 November 1974) is a Papua New Guinean politician. He was a member of the National Parliament of Papua New Guinea from 2012 to 2017, representing the electorate of Moresby North East Open for the People's Movement for Change (2012-2013) and People's National Congress (2013-2017). He was Vice-Minister for Sports and the Pacific Games in the ministry of Peter O'Neill.

Amaiu, the son of former Kompiam-Ambium MP Tom Amaiu, was educated at Tavangau Primary School in Mount Hagen and Tari High School before doing Year 11 and Year 12 at Brisbane Boys' College in Australia. He received a Diploma in Business Administration from TAFE in Australia and an IEA Diploma in International Business. Prior to entering politics, he was a self-employed businessman and the chairman of Port Moresby Rugby Football League. Amaiu finished third in the Moresby North-East Open seat at the 2007 election, running as an independent; he challenged the election of victor Andrew Mald in court, but the case was dismissed.

He was elected to the National Parliament at the 2012 election as a People's Movement for Change candidate, defeating Mald in a rematch. He was immediately appointed Vice-Minister for Sports and the Pacific Games upon his election. In January 2013, he defected to the governing People's National Congress, stating that while he still valued his former party and had confidence in leader Gary Juffa, his people would benefit from the leadership of Prime Minister O'Neill. He lost his seat at the 2017 election, finishing third behind eventual winner John Kaupa.

National Parliament of Papua New Guinea
| Preceded by Andrew Mald | Member for Moresby North-East Open; 2012–2017 | Succeeded by John Kaupa |
