= Pacific International Hospital =

Hospitals in Port moresby, PNG

Pacific International Hospitals
- PIH

Geography
- Location: Taurama - Port Moresby, Papua New Guinea

Organisation
- Care system: Private Health Care

Helipads
- Helipad: Available

Links
- Website: https://www.pihpng.com/

Pacific International Hospital (PIH) is a medical service center in Port Moresby. It is located in Taurama area. The hospital has various specialized departments including 24-hour intensive care and ambulance services. The hospital has more than 100 inpatient beds.

== History ==
This institution was established by the late Mohamed Sultan in 1997 as a private institution in Port Moresby. Originally founded as "PNG Diagnostic Centre" in 1997, it was later renamed "Pacific International Hospital. "Initially, the Sultan introduced the country's first CT scan facility; subsequently, in 2001, a full-time hospital providing 24-hour services was established at Port Moresby (4 Mile). Later, in 2005, it was upgraded into a multi-specialty medical center, with the addition of an Intensive Care Unit (ICU) as well as hemodialysis and mammography departments.

== 2011 ==
The hospital was established through a public-private partnership near the 3-Mile area of Port Moresby, featuring services such as a physiotherapy and rehabilitation center. In 2014, it became the first hospital to receive ISO certification. Subsequently, a multidisciplinary unit was officially opened in 2015, bringing upgrades that provided access to MRI scanning and cardiac catheterization laboratory facilities.

== Branches ==
Services were expanded to other parts of the country in 2016, including the establishment of the Lae International Hospital and smaller clinic facilities in Port Moresby and other provinces. The country's first private RT-PCR testing machines were imported and installed in 2020. Specialized services in oncology and ENT were introduced, and regional medical center services were extended as far as Goroka and Kokopo. The organization has continued its operations nationwide.

== Services ==
- General Medicine
- General Surgery
- Orthopedic Surgery
- Physiotherapy and Pain clinic / Rehabilitation
- Laboratory
- Gastrointestinal / surgery / Endoscopy
- Cardiology / Cardiac catheterization
- MRI / CT scan / X- ray / Doppler / Ultrasonography
- Ophthalmology department
- Emergency medicine
- ENT
- Pediatric medicine
- Obstructive and Gynecology
- Visa medicals
- Speech therapy and Audiometry
- Neurology department / surgery
- Oncology Department
- Operation theater / Advanced
- Ambulance services
- Helipad service (Medivac)
- Pathology department
- Hemodialysis

== Gallery ==
helipad of pih

PNG 51 independence celebrations

celebration PNG51

== See also ==
- Port Moresby
- National Capital District
- Taurama
