= Peter Isoaimo =

Papua New Guinean politician

Peter Namea Isoaimo (born 12 December 1969) is a Papua New Guinean politician. He has been a National Alliance Party member of the National Parliament of Papua New Guinea since February 2014, representing the electorate of Kairuku-Hiri Open in Central Province.

Isoaimo was educated at St. Mary's Primary School and Dela Salle High School in Bereina and the Mount Hagen Technical College. He was the company secretary of ENJO Limited, economic sector chairman of the Central Province provincial government, the Brown River Ward 17 councillor for the Hiri Local Level Government and the National Alliance Party co-ordinator in Central Province prior to entering national politics. Isoaimo contested the 2012 election for the Papua New Guinea Party; he finished second, but successfully challenged the result in court in December 2012 on the basis that Aihi had committed bribery during the campaign. Isoaimo then contested and won the resulting by-election in February 2014, having been endorsed by National Alliance in the by-election.

In June 2014, he stated that his main priorities were road funding, health and education. He has also dealt with a number of issues associated with the impact of National Capital District Governor Powes Parkop's "buai ban" on betel nut growers in his constituency and controversial land deals in his electorate which he had opposed, resulting in a Commission of Inquiry. In April 2016, he supported calls for the Kairuku-Hiri electorate to be split into two, claiming that it was too large to be manageable.

National Parliament of Papua New Guinea
Preceded by Paru Aihi	Member for Kairuku-Hiri Open; 2014–present	Incumbent
