= Hami Yawari =

Papua New Guinea politician (died 2011)

Personal details
- Citizenship: Papua New Guinea
- Political party: PNG Conservative Party

Hami Yawari (died 2011) was a politician in Papua New Guinea. He served as governor of Southern Highlands Province from 2002 to 2007.
