= Moi Avei =

Papua New Guinean politician

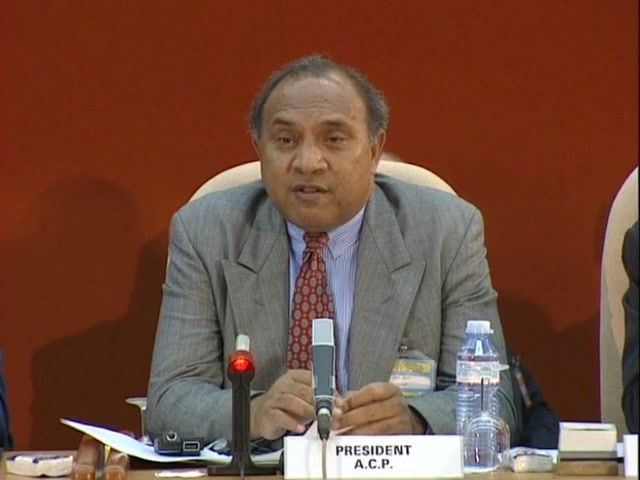
Avei in 1995

Moi Avei KBE (born 24 October 1946) is a Papua New Guinean politician. He was a member of the National Parliament of Papua New Guinea from 1992 to 2007, representing the Kairuku-Hiri electorate. He was Deputy Prime Minister of Papua New Guinea from 2004 to 2006 under Michael Somare.

Avei was born in Boera village in Kairuku-Hiri District and was educated at Ipswich Grammar School and the University of Queensland in Australia, where he graduated with a Bachelor of Social Work. He was variously PNG's Director of Child Welfare, a political advisor (at various times to Michael Somare, Akoka Doi, and the opposition as a whole), a businessman, and a consultant before entering politics. Aside from his stint as Deputy Prime Minister, Avei also served in a number of ministerial portfolios, including Higher Education, Science and Technology, National Planning, Bougainville Affairs and Petroleum and Energy. In 2006, he was suspended over misconduct allegations. He later went on to a business career, serving in a number of capacities, including Chairman of Ok Tedi Mining Limited (since 2014) and Director of Bougainville Copper (since 2016).

Avei was appointed a Knight Commander of the Order of the British Empire (KBE) in the 2002 New Year Honours

Political offices
Preceded by Moses Maladina	Deputy Prime Minister of Papua New Guinea; 2004–2006	Succeeded by Don Polye
