= Aide Ganasi =

Aide Ganasi (died 8 November 2016) was a Papua New Guinean politician. He was a People's National Congress member of the National Parliament of Papua New Guinea from July 2012 to March 2013 and from September 2013 until November 2016, representing the electorate of South Fly Open.

Ganasi served in the Papua New Guinea Defence Force for 23 years prior to entering politics, rising to the rank of major and serving as an officer in the Bougainville Civil War. He was an unsuccessful candidate for the People's Action Party at the 2002 election and for the Pangu Party at the 2007 election. Ganasi listed his last role prior to entering politics as having been a border administration officer at Daru.

He was elected to the National Parliament of Papua New Guinea at the 2012 election, representing the governing People's National Congress. He was immediately elected Deputy Speaker of parliament. However, Sali Subam, the MP Ganasi had defeated at the election, challenged the result in the National Court alleging that Ganasi had committed bribery, and in March 2013 the court ruled in Subam's favour, unseated Ganasi, and ordered a by-election. Ganasi appealed the result to the Supreme Court, which in September 2013 ruled in his favour and reinstated him after seven months out of office. He was frequently acting speaker from mid-2015 until his death due to Speaker Theo Zurenuoc serving as Acting Governor-General, during which time Ganasi was responsible for dealing with several attempted no-confidence motions in the O'Neill government.

He died on 8 November 2016 at a Port Moresby hospital following a heart attack. A state funeral was held on 30 November.

National Parliament of Papua New Guinea
Preceded by Sali Subam	Member for South Fly Open; 2012–2016	Succeeded by Sekie Agisa
