= Paul Isikiel =

Papua new Guinean politician

Paul Isikiel (born 8 October 1963) is a Papua New Guinean politician. He was a People's National Congress member of the National Parliament of Papua New Guinea from 2012 to 2017, representing the electorate of Markham Open. He was Minister for Housing and Urban Development in the government of Peter O'Neill from 2012 to 2017.

Prior to entering politics, Isikiel was a businessman and the manager of Suapi Management Consultant Limited (SMC). He was an unsuccessful candidate at the 2007 election. He was elected to the National Parliament at the 2012 election as a People's National Congress candidate, defeating MP Koni Iguan. He was appointed Minister for Housing and Urban Development in the post-election Cabinet reshuffle. He supported the Markham Valley Oil Palm Project, which had been initiated under his predecessor, and claimed early success in gaining funding for two regional roads and a vocational training centre, with and a third road following in December.

In September 2012, he suspended the managing director and board chairman of the National Housing Corporation pending an investigation over alleged misappropriation. In April 2013, he funded a double classroom and two school dormitories for the Markham Valley High School. In June 2013, he announced that the National Housing Corporation debt had been cut from K30 million to K19 million under his replacement leadership, as the organisation underwent an administrative overhaul. In May 2014, he announced a 40,000-house project at Durand Farm outside Port Moresby to relieve housing shortages in the capital. A K1.4 billion loan to fund the project was attacked by the opposition as being a burden on the economy.

Isikiel publicly feuded with the Police Association of Papua New Guinea and senior police in July 2014 after calling for the arrest of "rogue" police investigating a corruption case linked to Prime Minister O'Neill; he claimed the "rogue" police had "colluded with outside forces in an attempt to discredit and incriminate the Prime Minister". He also clashed with the Manufacturers Council of Papua New Guinea in November 2014 over a proposal that "certain building materials" be exempted from import duty to make housing cheaper. In March 2016, he announced a 500-house project to house public servants outside Kundiawa to relieve housing shortages in that area. He faced further problems later in 2016 with illegal sales of government housing and controversy surrounding evictions by the National Housing Corporation.

He was defeated at the 2017 election by Koni Iguan, the MP he had ousted in 2012.

National Parliament of Papua New Guinea
Preceded by Koni Iguan	Member for Markham Open; 2012–2017	Succeeded by Koni Iguan
