= Boka Kondra =

Boka Kondra (born 16 December 1970) is a Papua New Guinea politician. He was a member of the National Parliament of Papua New Guinea from July 2007 until December 2016, representing the electorate of North Fly Open, variously as an independent, for the National Alliance and for the People's National Congress. He was Vice-Minister for Mining (2011–2012) and Minister for Tourism, Arts and Culture (2012–2016) in the O'Neill government. Kondra was dismissed from office in December 2016 after a leadership tribunal found him guilty of misappropriation charges.

== First term and ministerial career ==
Kondra, an Ok Tedi mine landowner, first contested the 2002 election as a candidate of the Yumi Reform Party, but was defeated by Rural Pipol's Pati candidate Martin Tabi. He contested the seat for a second time at the 2007 election, running as an independent, and defeated Tabi, who had by this time joined the People's National Congress. His party affiliation was subject to some confusion: it was first reported that he would join the National Alliance, he was then reported to have joined People's National Congress, before sitting with National Alliance. He was also selected as deputy governor of Western Province. In 2009, he proposed a Resource Owners Bill which would transfer resource ownership from the state to customary landowners, and was the subject of heated and lengthy discussion; after being opposed by the Somare government, it was still being debated at least three years later.

In July 2009, Kondra was one of 11 National Alliance MPs to defect to the opposition. In November 2009, Kondra was involved in launching the PNG Charter of the International Parliamentarians for West Papua, along with Powes Parkop, advocating self-determination for the people of West Papua. In May 2011, he was one of several MPs to insist that the Ok Tedi mine must close in 2013. Following Peter O'Neill's ouster of Michael Somare as Prime Minister in August 2011, Kondra was named Vice-Minister for Mining in the new government. He subsequently crossed to O'Neill's People's National Congress, and was re-elected for the PNC at the 2012 election. After his 2012 re-election, Kondra was appointed to the O'Neill cabinet as Minister for Tourism, Arts and Culture. In December 2012, O'Neill publicly ruled out any changes to resources ownership laws along the lines of Kondra's long-discussed bill.

In September 2013, Kondra was outspoken in support of a successful bid to remove BHP Billiton's legal immunity in regard to the Ok Tedi mine, thanking O'Neill for "wiping away the tears of our people". He criticised the company for the environmental impact of the mine, in particular due to waste dumping in the Fly River and spoke about deaths caused by pollution. Kondra stated that "since 1979, no development had taken place" and that his people had "been crucified for the benefit of economical benefit" by indemnifying the company against lawsuits. In October 2013, he supported a government takeover of the mine to return greater benefit to Western Province, and advocated that Ok Tedi, having been the first mine to be expropriated from corporate ownership, would be "a model mine for others to follow". In October 2014, he declared that "his fight with Ok Tedi was over".

== Misappropriation allegations, trial and dismissal ==
Kondra suffered a heart attack on 27 February 2014 and was transferred to Australia by medivac, but recovered and returned home in mid-March. In July 2014, the Ombudsman Commission referred Kondra to the public prosecutor for alleged misconduct in office, with the public prosecutor recommending the appointment of a leadership tribunal in November. It was alleged that Kondra had misapplied District Services Improvement Program funds on accommodation for himself and on paying campaign debts from the 2012 election. In February 2015, the leadership tribunal suspended him from office pending his trial. He was found guilty on all six charges by the leadership tribunal in April 2015, with the tribunal recommending criminal charges, and in May recommending that he be dismissed from office.

Kondra appealed his dismissal to the National Court, and in June won a stay while the appeal was heard. Kondra lost his ministerial portfolios in a January 2016 reshuffle, with O'Neill stating that he would remain as minister without portfolio until his legal issues were resolved. In March 2016, the National Court dismissed Kondra's appeal and confirmed his dismissal from office. Kondra then appealed to the Supreme Court, and again won a stay of his dismissal pending its resolution, in part due to the proximity of the 2017 election. The Supreme Court again dismissed the appeal and confirmed his dismissal in December 2016.

National Parliament of Papua New Guinea
Preceded by Martin Tabi	Member for North Fly Open; 2007–2016	Vacant until the 2017 election
