= James Lagea =

James Yapa Lagea (born 4 February 1963) is a Papua New Guinea politician. He has been a member of the National Parliament of Papua New Guinea since July 2007, representing the electorate of Kagua-Erave Open. He has been Vice-Minister for Health and HIV/AIDS in the government of Peter O'Neill since August 2012. He has variously been a member of the PNG Conservative Party (2007), National Alliance (2007–2010), United Resources Party (2010–2012) and Papua New Guinea Party (2012); although formally sitting in parliament as an independent during his second term, he has been prominently aligned with the People's United Assembly (2012–2014) and the People's National Congress (2014–present).

Lagea was educated at Kagua Primary School, Mendi High School, Keravat National High School and the Institute of Public Administration, where he attained a diploma in social development. He was a community development advisor for the Southern Highlands provincial administration before entering politics. Lagea first contested the Kagua-Erave seat at the 2002 election on behalf of the People's Progress Party, when voting in Southern Highlands Province was cancelled due to widespread violence. He again contested the supplementary election in 2003, but lost to incumbent People's Democratic Movement MP David Basua. Lagea challenged the result in the Court of Disputed Returns, but was unsuccessful. Lagea served as the chairperson of the organising committee for the celebrations surrounding the 30th anniversary of Papua New Guinean independence in Southern Highlands during 2005.

Lagea contested the Kagua-Erave seat for a second time at the 2007 election as the candidate of the fledgling Papua New Guinea Conservative Party and was successful, defeating Basua. He crossed to the governing National Alliance Party upon his election. In his first term, he was chairman of the Citizenship Committee and the Parliamentary Referral Committee on Lands and Environment and a member of the Parliamentary Referral Committee on Health and Family Welfare. He crossed to the United Resources Party in July 2010, and again to the Papua New Guinea Party in March 2012. Lagea was re-elected at the 2012 election, which he formally contested as an independent, and joined the People's United Assembly party after the election.

He was appointed Vice-Minister for Health in August 2012. In August 2013, the National Court dismissed a legal challenge to his 2012 re-election, but referred him to the Ombudsman Commission for investigation of potential misconduct in office. In November 2013, he strongly condemned tribal fighting in Kagua that killed seventeen people and provided K$50,000 funding for police operations in its aftermath. He again called for an end to election-related tribal fighting in April 2014, pointing out that Kagua was "deserted" as a result and that it was severely impeding service delivery in the area. In July 2014, he was faced with responding to widespread flooding which rendered thousands of villagers in his electorate homeless, and dedicated K$250,000 to relief funding.

In October 2014, he crossed to the governing People's National Congress party. The Ombudsman Commission referred Lagea to the Public Prosecutor in January 2015 over issues around failing to furnish financial returns. A leadership tribunal found him guilty in August 2015 and suspended him from office until acquittal; however, this did not take effect as he had provided the returns in the interim. He is recontesting the 2017 election for the People's National Congress.

National Parliament of Papua New Guinea
Preceded by David Basua	Member for Kagua-Erave Open; 2007–present	Incumbent
