= Pato Kakaraya =

Papua New Guinea politician

Sir Pato Kakaraya, KBE, CMG, is a Papua New Guinea politician and former Cabinet Minister. Kakaraya was the second person considered for the elections for Governor-General of Papua New Guinea in 2004. Despite Sir Paulias Matane's win, Kakaraya disputed the vote. He ran again in 2011, but lost 65-23 to Sir Michael Ogio.

Kakaraya only had a grade 6 education, but he later attended the Lutheran Mission as a youth leader (1958-1966) and later as translator (1966-1967).

He was advisor at Waso Limited from 1967 to 1971, then joined the Wabag Native Trading Company from 1971 to 1972.

He was elected as a member of the National Parliament for the Wapenamanda Open Seat from 1972-1987.

Kakaraya held ministerial posts including:

- Minister for Environment and Conservation 1978-1980
- Minister for Youth, Recreation and Women Affairs 1977-1978
- Minister for Works and Implementation 1981-1985
