= Komun Joe Koim =

Papua New Guinean politician

Komun Joe Koim (10 October 1966 – 12 September 2019) was a Papua New Guinean politician. He had been a member of the National Parliament of Papua New Guinea since 2012, representing the electorate of Anglimp-South Waghi Open, first as an independent and later for the People's Democratic Movement.

Koim was educated at Taragau Primary School, Mount Hagen Secondary School and the Papua New Guinea University of Technology in Lae. He was a businessman prior to entering politics. He was an unsuccessful candidate at the 2007 election, when he ran as an independent and lost to Jamie Maxtone-Graham. He was elected to the National Parliament on his second attempt at the 2012 election, again as an independent. Koim subsequently crossed to the People's Democratic Movement. In September 2013, he was praised by a number of local leaders for having increased service provision, including new community halls and funding for schools and health centres. In March 2014, he launched a microcredit scheme in his district.

National Parliament of Papua New Guinea
Preceded by Jamie Maxtone-Graham	Member for Anglimp-South Waghi Open; 2012–present	Incumbent
