= Ludwig Schulze =

Papua New Guinean politician

Ludwig Schulze (died 8 March 2013) was a Papua New Guinean politician from the Pangu Party. He was MP for Angoram. He was Police Minister in the 1990s.

He lost his seat in the National Parliament to Arthur Somare in 1997 but regained it in 2012.

Schulze died at Pacific International Hospital in Port Moresby following surgery.
