= Papua New Guinea Post-Courier =

Daily newspaper

- Type: Daily newspaper
- Format: Tabloid
- Owner: News Corp
- Founded: June 1969
- Headquarters: Lawes Road, Konedobu, Port Moresby
- Country: Papua New Guinea
- Website: www.postcourier.com.pg

The Papua New Guinea Post-Courier is a newspaper based in Konedobu, Port Moresby, Papua New Guinea.

It was established on 30 June 1969. Its parent company, The Herald and Weekly Times (later purchased by News Corp Australia), had acquired what had then been the two main newspapers in Papua New Guinea, the three-days-a-week South Pacific Post and the twice-weekly New Guinea Times Courier, and decided to amalgamate them into one publication. It was the first national daily newspaper in Papua New Guinea.

Luke Sela was editor from 1978 to 2000.

The Post-Courier has a daily circulation of 26,262. The paper is majority owned by Rupert Murdoch's News Corp. The Post-Courier's readership is mainly urban, and it is considered to be influential in the community.

== See also ==
- List of newspapers in Papua New Guinea
