= South Bougainville District =

- Location within Papua New Guinea
- Coordinates: 6.746°S 155.685°E
- Country: Papua New Guinea
- Regions: Bougainville
- Capital: Buin

Government
  - MP: Timothy Masiu

Area
  - Total: 3,785 km^{2} (1,461 sq mi)

Population (2011 census)
  - Total: 81,675
  - Density: 21.58/km^{2} (55.89/sq mi)
- Time zone: UTC+11:00 (BST)

South Bougainville District is a district of the Autonomous Region of Bougainville of Papua New Guinea. The district has four local-level governments. Its capital is Buin. South Bougainville languages are spoken in the district.

== Local-level governments ==
- Bana Rural
- Buin Rural
- Siwai Rural
- Torokina Rural
