= Leo Dion =

Papua New Guinean politician

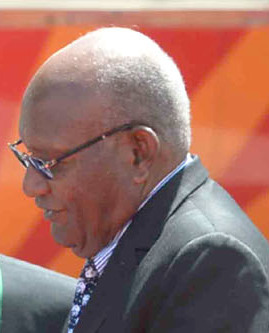
Dion in 2016

Chief Sir Leo Dion GCL KBE CMG QPM (born 1950) is a Papua New Guinean politician. He was the Deputy Prime Minister of Papua New Guinea from 2012 to 2017.

He worked as a police officer before entering politics, and was awarded the Queen's Police Medal.

Dion was first elected to the National Parliament in a by-election in 2000, for the East New Britain provincial seat. His election to the provincial seat also made him Governor of the East New Britain province, of which he was previously deputy governor. He has been re-elected continuously to the seat and governorship since then, most recently in 2012.

Formerly a member of the National Alliance Party, he joined the Triumph Heritage Empowerment Party ("THE Party") prior to the 2012 general election. Following that election, Prime Minister Peter O'Neill appointed him Deputy Prime Minister and Minister for Inter-Government Relations. In June 2014, Dion joined O'Neill's People's National Congress Party.

Dion lost his seat to former MP Nakikus Konga in the 2017 election.

Political offices
Preceded by Belden Namah	Deputy Prime Minister of Papua New Guinea; 2012–2017	Succeeded by Charles Abel
National Parliament of Papua New Guinea
Preceded by Francis Koimanrea	Member for East New Britain Provincial; 2000–2017	Succeeded by Nakikus Konga
