= Triumph Heritage Empowerment Party =

- Leader: Geoffery Kama
- President: Warusam Debege
- Secretary: Samuel Kopamu
- Founder: Don Polye
- Founded: 23 January 2012
- Split from: National Alliance Party
- Ideology: Christian democracy; Conservatism
- Political position: Right-wing
- National Parliament: 1 / 118

Website
- Facebook page

The Triumph Heritage Empowerment Party ("T.H.E. Party") is a political party in Papua New Guinea. It was founded in 2012 by Don Polye, Minister of Finance at the time.

As of May 2019, the party has 1 member in the National Parliament.

== Background ==
Polye had first entered Parliament in the 2002 general election, as a member of the National Alliance Party, whose leader Sir Michael Somare became Prime Minister. In August 2011, the NAP-led Somare government was brought down in a parliamentary motion of no confidence (whilst Somare was recovering from surgery in hospital), leading to a split in the party, between members who remained loyal to Somare, and others - including Polye - who joined Peter O'Neill's new government. In October, it was reported simultaneously that the party was expelling the latter, and that Polye had assumed leadership of the party. What had happened was a split, with two opposing factions both claiming to constitute the party. In January 2012, Polye purported to de-register the NAP, despite the existence of a rival faction. The members of his faction reconstituted themselves as the Triumph Heritage Empowerment Rural Party, ahead of the June 2012 general election. The new party was officially launched at the Granville Motel in Port Moresby on 23 January.

When three National Alliance MPs (Timothy Bonga, Sasa Zibe and Bob Dadea) chose to join O'Neill's People's National Congress Party rather than Polye's new party, Polye reportedly said "that the battle lines for the formation of new government after the coming elections were being drawn between his new party and O'Neill's party", suggesting the two parties would become the major political forces of the country, eclipsing what was left of the National Alliance.

== Values and policies ==
During his inaugural speech which launched the party, Polye said it would be "focusing on trying to restore Christian values, the churches to give counselling on the value of the family unit as family is the foundation of a stable society". It would also, he said, address the issues of "climate change, environment and wildlife conservation". The party would seek to promote a "diversified economy", and, in terms of foreign policy, would "modernise strategic partnerships". He added:

"I want a policy to improve the salary, working and living conditions for all professional public servants, a rural and urban housing scheme, strengthening the village court system through improving salaries and living conditions, strengthening existing delivery systems by DSIP, promoting gender equity, free education for all ages and to support technical skills."

In addition to the acronym it produces, Polye explained the name of the party as follows:

- Triumph: "Everyone shall use their intelligence given by God to creatively triumph over all shortcomings, problems and obstacles";
- Heritage: Papua New Guinea was a multi-cultural country, but family values were its common heritage and a source of strength;
- Empowerment: "Everyone shall pursue people empowerment policies and programmes that enable our people by giving them the mental as well as the physical capacity and strengths to make independent personal choices and decision for themselves and their families".

== Founding members ==
Upon its launch, the party reportedly included 22 MPs, including nine Cabinet ministers. Among its founding members were Jeffery Nape (parliamentary Speaker), Benjamin Poponawa, Alphonse Moroi, Mark Maipakai (Minister for Intergovernment Relations & District Development), Tom Olga (Governor of the Western Highlands Province), James Gau, Benjamin Mul, Andrew Mald (Minister for Community Development, Religion, & Family Affairs), Philip Kikala, Mathew Poiya, Pitom Bombom, Sali Subam (Minister for Sports), Sai Beseo (Minister for Correctional Services), David Arore (Minister for Higher Education, Research, Science, & Technology), Miki Kaeok, Yawa Silupa, Buka Malai, Michael Sapau (Governor of Manus Province), Ano Pala (Minister for Foreign Affairs & Immigration), Peter Humphreys and Leo Dion.

== Subsequent developments ==
In March 2014, Don Polye was dismissed from Prime Minister Peter O'Neill's government, for not abiding by Cabinet solidarity. In May, with their party leader now sitting on the Opposition benches, Cabinet ministers Douglas Tomuriesa (Forestry), Delilah Gore (Higher Education) and Benjamin Poponawa (Labour and Industrial Relations) all resigned from the party, staying with the government. In September, the party was expelled from the government coalition.
