= Delilah Gore =

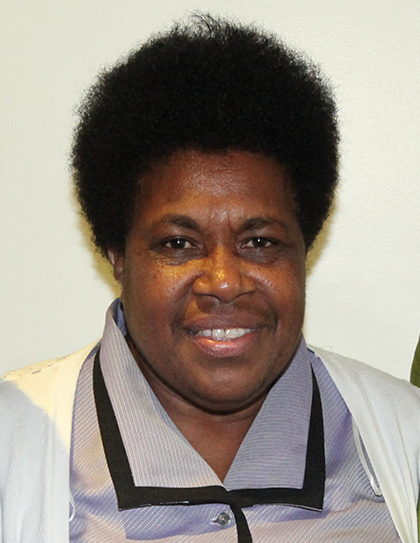
Gore in 2014

Delilah Pueka Gore (born 24 June 1962) is a Papua New Guinean politician. She was a member of the National Parliament of Papua New Guinea from 2012 to 2017, representing the electorate of Sohe Open. She was Minister for Higher Education, Science, Research and Technology and later Minister for Religion, Youth & Community Development in the government of Peter O'Neill.

She was elected to the Sohe District, in the Northern Province, in the 2012 election. She was one of only three women in the 2021-17 Parliament, and had spoken out in the past about the need for a small number of reserved seats for women in parliament. However, she rejected calls for affirmative action, and undid some of the pro-women reforms introduced by her predecessor, Dame Carol Kidu.

In August 2015 she was suspended from Cabinet for three months without pay after verbally abusing and threatening a flight attendant who had asked her to turn off her mobile phone on an Air Niugini flight. (Gore was removed from the plane as a consequence of her behaviour.)

She was defeated by Henry Amuli at the 2017 election. She had been the last of the three women MPs in the previous parliament to remain in serious contention; her defeat marked the first time since 1997 that no women sat in the parliament.

National Parliament of Papua New Guinea
Preceded by Anthony Nene	Member for Sohe Open; 2012–2017	Succeeded by Henry Amuli
