= The National (Papua New Guinea) =

English-language newspaper in Papua New Guinea

- Front page of The National on June 11, 2008. The main headline is the funeral ceremony for Joseph Kabui.
- Type: Weekday newspaper
- Owner(s): Rimbunan Hijau
- Founded: 1993
- Language: English
- Headquarters: Boroko, Port Moresby
- Country: Papua New Guinea
- Website: www.thenational.com.pg

The National is a weekday English language newspaper published in Papua New Guinea. It is also published online. The paper is owned by Malaysian logging company Rimbunan Hijau.

== See also ==
- List of newspapers in Papua New Guinea
