= Kiyoto Kagawa =

Imperial Japanese Navy rear admiral (1895–1943)

- 香川 清登
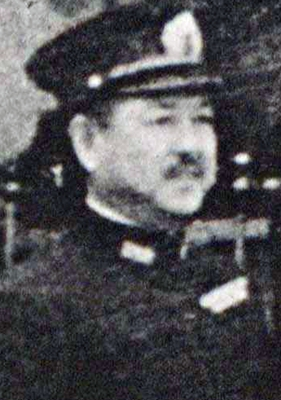
- Born: December 11, 1895; Hiroshima, Japan
- Died: November 26, 1943 (aged 47); Off Cape St. George, Solomon Islands
- Education: Imperial Japanese Naval Academy; Naval War College
- Military career
- Allegiance: Empire of Japan
- Branch: Imperial Japanese Navy
- Service years: 1918–1943
- Rank: Rear admiral (posthumous)
- Units: Azuma, Aso, Ariake, Susuki, Fusō, Natori, Yūbari, Takao, Ōi
- Commands: Fubuki, Shinonome, 31st Destroyer Group
- Conflicts: World War II; Bougainville campaign; Battle of Cape St. George †

Kiyoto Kagawa (香川 清登, Kagawa Kiyoto; December 11, 1895 – November 26, 1943) was a rear admiral in the Imperial Japanese Navy during World War II.

== Biography ==
Kagawa was born in Hiroshima Prefecture. He graduated from the 46th class of the Imperial Japanese Naval Academy, ranking 53rd out of 124 cadets. He served as midshipman on the cruiser Azuma, and as ensign on the cruiser Aso and destroyers Ariake and Susuki. After his promotion to lieutenant, and tours of duty aboard the battleship Fusō and cruiser Natori, Kagawa attended advanced navigational training courses at the Naval War College. On graduation and after promotion to lieutenant commander in 1930, he was assigned as chief navigator on a number of ships, including the cruisers Yūbari and Takao, and battleship Fusō. He received his first command — the destroyer Fubuki — on 16 November 1936. He then was captain of the destroyer Shinonome and executive officer of the cruiser Ōi.

Kagawa was promoted to captain on 15 October 1941, and after a series of staff positions, was appointed commander of the 31st Destroyer Group (Desdiv 31) on 12 February 1943. Kagawa's group consisted of the destroyers Ōnami (flagship), Makinami, Amagiri, Yūgiri and Uzuki. During the Battle of Cape St. George on 26 November 1943, Ōnami was sunk and Kagawa was killed in action. He was posthumously promoted to rear admiral.

== Sources ==
- Brown, David (1990). Warship Losses of World War Two. Naval Institute Press. ISBN 1-55750-914-X.
- D'Albas, Andrieu (1965). Death of a Navy: Japanese Naval Action in World War II. Devin-Adair Pub. ISBN 0-8159-5302-X.
- Dull, Paul S. (1978). A Battle History of the Imperial Japanese Navy, 1941-1945. Naval Institute Press. ISBN 0-87021-097-1.
- Hara, Tameichi (1961). Japanese Destroyer Captain. New York & Toronto: Ballantine Books. ISBN 0-345-27894-1.
- Jones, Ken (1997). Destroyer Squadron 23: Combat Exploits of Arleigh Burke's Gallant Force. Naval Institute Press. ISBN 1-55750-412-1.
- Kilpatrick, C. W. (1987). Naval Night Battles of the Solomons. Exposition Press. ISBN 0-682-40333-4.
- McGee, William L. (2002). "Bougainville Campaign". The Solomons Campaigns, 1942-1943: From Guadalcanal to Bougainville--Pacific War Turning Point, Volume 2 (Amphibious Operations in the South Pacific in WWII). BMC Publications. ISBN 0-9701678-7-3.
- Morison, Samuel Eliot (1958). Breaking the Bismarcks Barrier, vol. 6 of History of United States Naval Operations in World War II. Castle Books. ISBN 0-7858-1307-1.
- Potter, E. B. (2005). Admiral Arleigh Burke. Naval Institute Press. ISBN 1-59114-692-5.
- Roscoe, Theodore (1953). United States Destroyer Operations in World War Two. Naval Institute Press. ISBN 0-87021-726-7.
