= USS Charles Ausburne (DD-570) =

Fletcher-class destroyer

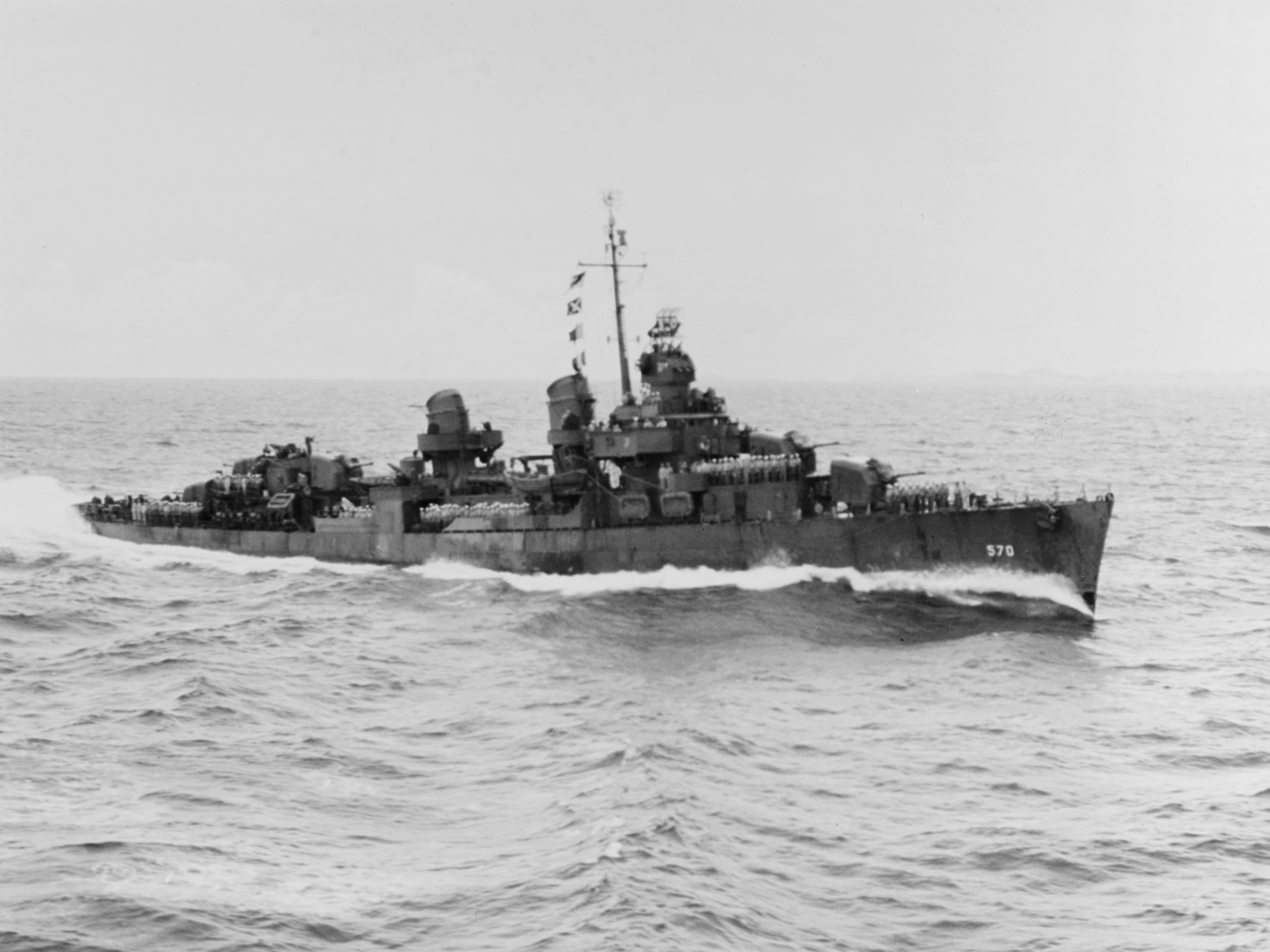
- USS Charles Ausburne (DD-570) in the vicinity of the Solomon Islands, 23 March 1944

History

United States
- Name: USS Charles Ausburne (DD-570)
- Namesake: Charles Ausburne
- Builder: Consolidated Steel Corporation, Orange, Texas
- Laid down: 14 May 1941
- Launched: 16 March 1942
- Commissioned: 24 November 1942
- Decommissioned: 18 April 1946
- Stricken: 1 December 1967
- Honors and awards: Presidential Unit Citation, 11 Battle Stars
- Fate: transferred to West German Navy, 12 April 1960

History

West Germany
- Name: Zerstörer 6 (D180)
- Acquired: 12 April 1960
- Stricken: October 1968
- Fate: Scrapped

General characteristics
- Class & type: Fletcher-class destroyer; Zerstörer 1-class destroyer
- Displacement: 2,050 long tons (2,080 t)
- Length: 376 ft 6 in (114.76 m)
- Beam: 39 ft 8 in (12.09 m)
- Draft: 17 ft 9 in (5.41 m)
- Propulsion: 60,000 shp (45 MW) ; 2 propellers
- Speed: 35 knots (65 km/h; 40 mph)
- Range: 6,500 nmi (12,000 km; 7,500 mi) at 15 knots (28 km/h; 17 mph)
- Complement: 329
- Armament: 5 × single Mk 12 5 in (127 mm)/38 guns; 5 × twin 40 mm (1.6 in) Bofors AA guns; 7 × single 20 mm (0.8 in) Oerlikon AA guns; 2 × quintuple 21 in (533 mm) torpedo tubes; 6 × single depth charge throwers; 2 × depth charge racks

USS Charles Ausburne (DD-570), a Fletcher-class destroyer, was the second ship of the United States Navy to be named for Charles L. Ausburne, a sailor in World War I who was posthumously awarded the Navy Cross.

Charles Ausburne was launched 16 March 1942 by Consolidated Steel Corporation, Orange, Tex.; sponsored by Mrs. W. H. Cotten; and commissioned 24 November 1942.

Charles Ausburne's first mission which took place between 1 April and 8 May 1943 was to escort a convoy from New York to Casablanca, returning with another. At Boston on 11 May, she joined Destroyer Squadron 23 upon its activation, and was assigned as flagship for Destroyer Division 45.

== Guadalcanal and Solomon Islands campaigns ==
Charles Ausburne arrived at Nouméa, New Caledonia, 28 June 1943 to begin a summer of patrol and escort duties supporting the conquest of Guadalcanal, guarding convoys to that island, and between such ports as Efate and Espiritu Santo. From 27 August, she was based at Port Purvis on Florida Island, in the Solomons, where she was part of a striking force designed to interrupt the passage of the "Tokyo Express", the nightly runs of Japanese destroyers evacuating troops from the Solomons to Bougainville and New Britain. Her first patrol "up the Slot" on the night of 27–28 August, was uneventful, and her first contact with the enemy came on 7 September, when her group came under enemy air attack. During this time, she guarded the movement of transports and LSTs redeploying men in the Solomons, and took part in experiments with night fighters.

It was on the night of 27–28 September 1943 that the enemy first felt Charles Ausburne's fire, when she sank two barges in the waters off Vella Lavella. Early in October, she returned to Espiritu Santo for replenishment and training, and here on 23 October the squadron's most famous Commander, Captain Arleigh A. Burke, broke his pennant in Charles Ausburne. Under his command, the "Little Beavers", as he nicknamed the squadron, were to be recognized by the awarding of the Presidential Unit Citation. Their continual series of operations against Japanese naval forces and shore installations played a large part in the winning of the Solomon Islands, and Charles Ausburne was in the thickest action from 31 October 1943 to 23 February 1944.

Her support of the invasion of Bougainville began on the night of 31 October 1943, when her task force sortied from Port Purvis to neutralize the Japanese airfields at Buka with heavy gunfire. Charles Ausburne fired on shore batteries here and on the Shortlands, which the task force passed on its way south to refuel. In the early morning of 1 November, troops stormed ashore at Empress Augusta Bay, and word was received of the movement of four Japanese cruisers and six destroyers south from Rabaul to attack the transports off Bougainville. Immediately, Charles Ausburne and her force put north to meet and engage the enemy. First contact was made at 02:27, 2 November, when the targets were clear on the flagship's radar, and Charles Ausburne and three other "Little Beavers" maneuvered for a torpedo attack, which the Japanese evaded. Next, they finished off Sendai, already blazing from the attack of American cruisers, then sped at 32 knots to close on Hatsukaze. With Spence joining in the attack, Charles Ausburne sank the enemy destroyer, then dashed to the assistance of torpedo-damaged Foote whom she escorted back to Purvis Bay at the close of this Battle of Empress Augusta Bay.

Through the remainder of November, Charles Ausburne patrolled and conducted bombardments in the Bougainville area, several times escorting resupply echelons to that island. Devastating fire poured onto the Japanese airfield at Bonis, and antiaircraft actions were fought off the beachheads, as the squadron was almost constantly underway. On 24 November 1943, while the squadron refueled in Harborn Sound, orders came to intercept Japanese forces believed to be moving down to evacuate men from Buka. Immediately, the five American destroyers then composing the squadron moved north to search the Rabaul-Buka line, and at 01:41 on 25 November, a radar surface contact was made as the squadron patrolled in St. George Channel. Charles Ausburne with two others headed in for a torpedo attack on two Japanese destroyers as Burke's two remaining destroyers provided cover. Hits disintegrated Ōnami, and broke Makinami in two. Quickly as the covering ships polished Makinami off, Charles Ausburne and the others turned to attack three destroyer transports now visible, who turned and fled with the American destroyers in pursuit. At 02:15, acting on sound estimate, Captain Burke ordered his ships to make a sharp change of course to the right to evade torpedoes. Just a minute later came the slam of torpedoes exploding in the wake of his ships. Now the "Little Beavers" opened fire on the fleeing enemy, while maneuvering to avoid return fire. As the three targets took divergent courses, Charles Ausburne continued her pursuit of Yugiri, hitting her repeatedly. Soon blazing from stem to stern, the Japanese ship made a last desperate attempt to open the range but was quickly overhauled and sunk. Approaching daylight now made it imperative that the squadron withdraw to put distance between themselves and the Japanese airbase at Rabaul. Thus ended the classic destroyer battle of Cape St. George. Three enemy ships had been sunk and another badly damaged, while no damage was received by the American ships.

Through December 1943, Charles Ausburne continued her patrol, escort, antiaircraft, and bombardment duties in support of the Bougainville operation. After brief overhaul in Australia she returned to the northern Solomons 30 January 1944, and on 3 February sailed for action once more, fighting off a heavy Japanese air attack to break through for a bombardment mission on the northern coast of Bougainville. A series of patrols to cover the landings on Green Island and many searches for enemy surface craft were conducted, along with a punishing bombardment of Kavieng Harbor on 18 February. The enemy's port facilities, airstrip, and supply dump were almost completely destroyed in this attack.

From 20 February to 24 February 1944, the squadron swept the waters of New Ireland for Japanese shipping, sinking a tug, a coastal minelayer, a small freighter, and many barges, then returned to escorting amphibious craft until 5 March, when they sailed on a patrol north of the Bismarcks.

== Mariana Islands campaigns ==
On 26 March 1944, Charles Ausburne joined the 5th Fleet at sea, and next day Captain Burke left the ship to assume new responsibilities as Chief of Staff to the Commander, Fast Carrier Task Force, Admiral Marc Mitscher. With the powerful carrier striking force (then called Task Force 58, but called TF 38 when part of 3rd Fleet), Charles Ausburne sailed for air strikes in the Palaus and on Yap, Ulithi, and Woleai between 30 March and 1 April, then replenished at Majuro. Later in the month she sailed with the group formed around Yorktown, screening as the carrier offered direct air support during the landings at Hollandia, and launched strikes against Truk and Ponape. Returning to Majuro, Charles Ausburne joined in exercises preparing for the next great operation, the assault upon the Marianas.

On this mission, Charles Ausburne was at sea from 6 June to 6 July 1944, primarily steaming in the screen guarding the carriers of TF 58 as they repeatedly struck Tinian, Saipan, Pagan, Guam, and Iwo Jima. This neutralization of enemy airfields and island defenses made feasible the series of landings in the Marianas. Charles Ausburne also bombarded shore defenses on Guam, and screened USS Essex while the carrier hurled strikes at Saipan to support the initial landings on Guam and the advancing troops on Saipan.

== Philippines and Okinawa campaigns ==
After overhaul on the west coast, Charles Ausburne returned to Ulithi 5 November 1944, and through the remainder of November guarded carriers providing air cover for convoys to Leyte. Heavy air action came in December, when from 19 December to 24 December, the destroyer led the first resupply convoy from San Pedro Bay to Mindoro. On 21 December, four separate raids, one of which included kamikazes, met the fire of the screening destroyers, and more raids were fought off as the convoy unloaded.

Continuing her support of the return to the Philippines, Charles Ausburne screened transports from San Pedro Bay, sailing 4 January 1945, north for Lingayen Gulf. On 7 January, the escort fought off an enemy air attack, and later, Charles Ausburne, with three other destroyers, sped off to investigate a radar contact. It was Hinoki, quickly sunk with all hands by effective fire of the four American ships. On 9 January and 10 January, she shielded the assault landings, then hurled 5-inch shells ashore to aid advancing troops. Returning to San Pedro 15 January, Charles Ausburne began 2 months of convoy escort and patrol duty to Lingayen, and around San Pedro Bay.

Through late March and April 1945, the destroyer screened landings at Panay and Negros, and provided night illumination and call-fire support at both Negros and Parang on Mindanao. On 13 May, she sailed from San Pedro Bay to rejoin the 5th Fleet and on 16 May reached Okinawa's Hagushi anchorage. After a period of antisubmarine patrol, during which she twice drove off enemy air attack, she protected landings at Aguni Shima, and on 23 June, received her first assignment to the inferno of radar picket duty, which she survived without damage. She remained on patrol off Okinawa through the remainder of the war.

Charles Ausburne left Okinawa 10 September 1945, and arrived at Washington, D.C., 17 October to receive her Presidential Unit Citation. After a visit to New York, she reached Charleston, South Carolina, where she was placed out of commission in reserve 18 April 1946.

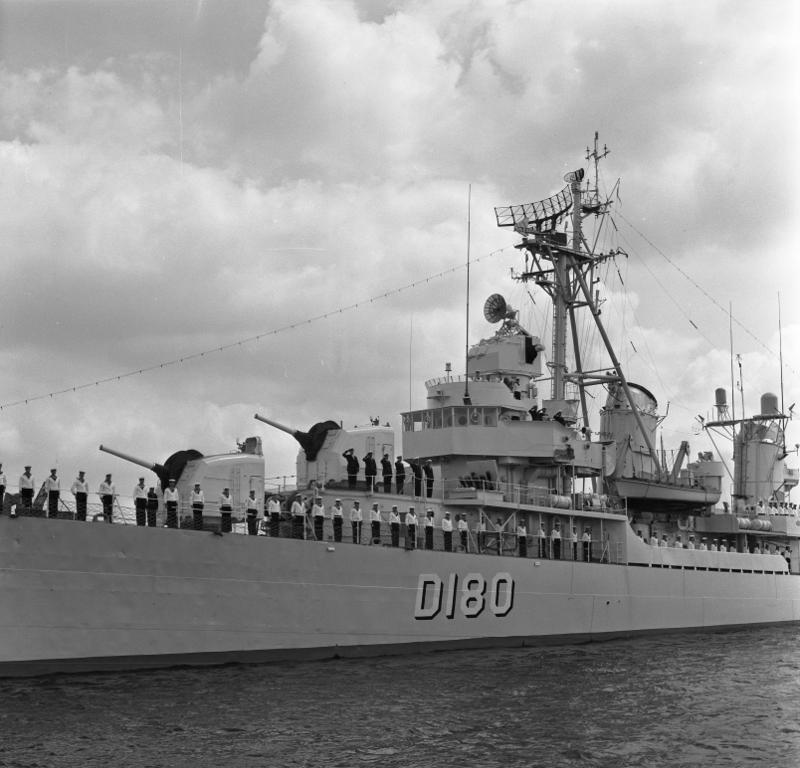
USS Charles Ausburne as the German Zerstörer 6 in 1962.

== German destroyer Zerstörer 6 ==
On 12 April 1960 Charles Ausburne was transferred to the Federal Republic of Germany, with whom she served as Zerstörer 6 ("Destroyer No. 6"), NATO designation "D180".

In 1962, she was commanded by former U-boat commander Kapitänleutnant Otto von Bülow (Knight's Cross of the Iron Cross with Oak Leaves).

She was stricken from the U.S. Navy List on 1 December 1967. Zerstörer 6 was stricken from the Bundesmarine in October 1968, and scrapped.

== Awards ==
In addition to the Presidential Unit Citation awarded her squadron, Charles Ausburne received 11 battle stars for World War II service.

== Notes ==
Since other family members spelled their name as "Ausburn", the first ship followed that spelling. It was later found that he himself signed as "Ausburne", and the second ship's name was so spelled.
