= Bougainville campaign =

World War II land battle in the Pacific between Allied and Japanese forces

Bougainville campaign (1943–45)
- Part of Operation Cartwheel of World War II
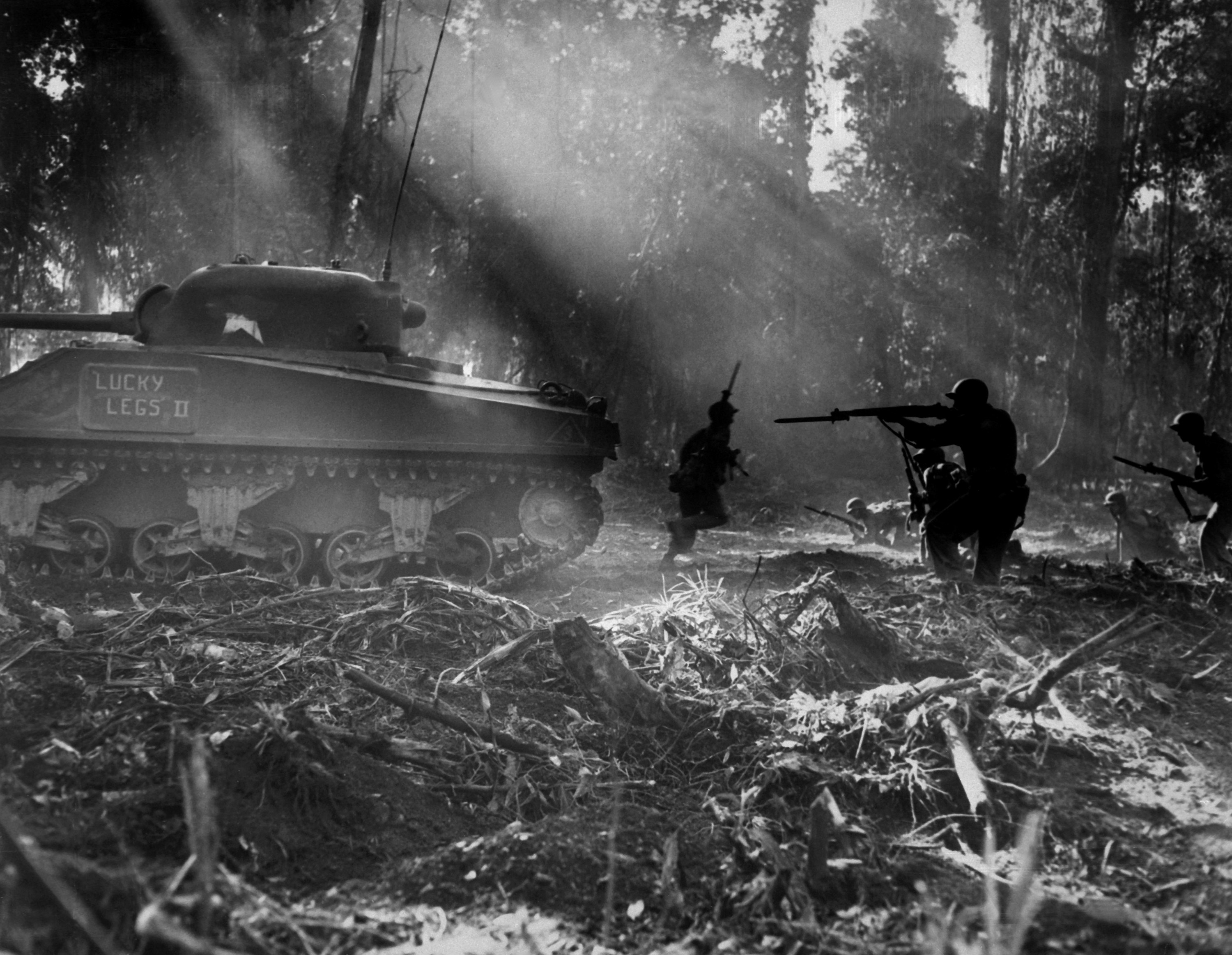
- United States Army soldiers hunt Japanese infiltrators on Bougainville in March 1944.
Date	1 November 1943 – 21 August 1945
Location	Bougainville, Territory of New Guinea (geographically part of the Solomon Islands) 6.02°S 155.10°E
Result	Allied victory

Belligerents
United States; Australia; New Zealand; Fiji	Japan

Commanders and leaders
(United States) Douglas MacArthur; (United States) William F. Halsey; (United States) Theodore S. Wilkinson; (United States) Alexander A. Vandegrift; (United States) Allen H. Turnage; (United States) Robert S. Beightler; (United States) Roy S. Geiger; (United States) Oscar W. Griswold; (Australia) Thomas Blamey; (Australia) Stanley Savige; (Australia) Alan Ramsay; (Australia) William Bridgeford; (Dominion of New Zealand) H. E. Barrowclough; (Dominion of New Zealand) Robert Amos Row	(Empire of Japan) Hitoshi Imamura; (Empire of Japan) Harukichi Hyakutake; (Empire of Japan) Mineichi Koga; (Empire of Japan) Jinichi Kusaka; (Empire of Japan) Tomoshige Samejima; (Empire of Japan) Sentaro Omori; (Empire of Japan) Kiyoto Kagawa †; (Empire of Japan) Masatane Kanda

Strength
144,000 American troops; 30,000 Australian troops; 728 aircraft	45,000–65,000 troops: 154 aircraft

Casualties and losses
United States: 727 dead; Australia: 516 dead	18,500–21,500 dead (Note: Figure includes deaths from all causes: combat, disease, starvation, and accident. The Australians counted 21,000 to 23,500 Japanese survivors on Bougainville upon the surrender of Japanese forces at the end of World War II. If Gailey's and Long's figure of 65,000 Japanese troops originally on Bougainville is accurate, then the Japanese casualty figures would be far higher. Long's figures are quoted in the narrative, totalling 16,700 combat deaths and 26,400 deaths from disease and malnutrition.)

The Bougainville campaign was a series of land and naval battles of the Pacific campaign of World War II between Allied forces and the Empire of Japan, named after the island of Bougainville, one of the Solomon Islands. It was part of Operation Cartwheel, the Allied grand strategy in the South Pacific.

The campaign took place in the Northern Solomons in two phases. The first phase, in which American troops landed and held the perimeter around the beachhead at Torokina, lasted from November 1943 through November 1944. The second phase, in which primarily Australian troops went on the offensive, mopping up pockets of starving, isolated but still-determined Japanese, lasted from November 1944 until August 1945, when the last Japanese soldiers on the island surrendered. Operations during the final phase of the campaign saw the Australian forces advance north towards the Bonis Peninsula and south towards the main Japanese stronghold around Buin, although the war ended before these two enclaves were completely destroyed.

== Japanese occupation ==
Before the war, Bougainville had been administered as part of the Australian Territory of New Guinea, even though geographically Bougainville is part of the Solomon Islands chain. As a result, within the various accounts of the campaign it is referred to as part of both the New Guinea and the Solomon Islands campaigns.

During their occupation the Japanese constructed naval aircraft bases in the north, east, and south of the island; but none in the west. They developed a naval anchorage at Tonolei Harbor near Buin, their largest base, on the southern coastal plain of Bougainville. On the nearby Treasury and Shortland Islands they built airfields, naval bases and anchorages. These bases helped protect Rabaul, the major Japanese garrison and naval base in Papua New Guinea, while allowing continued expansion to the southeast, down the Solomon Islands chain, to Guadalcanal and beyond. To the Allies, Bougainville would later also be considered vital for neutralizing the Japanese base around Rabaul.

In March–April 1942, the Japanese landed on Bougainville as part of their advance into the South Pacific. At the time, there was only a small Australian garrison on the island which consisted of about 20 soldiers from the 1st Independent Company and some coastwatchers. Shortly after the Japanese arrived, the bulk of the Australian force was evacuated by the Allies, although some of the coastwatchers remained behind to provide intelligence. Once secured, the Japanese began constructing airfields across the island. The main airfields were on Buka Island; the Bonis Peninsula in the north; Kahili and Kara in the south; and Kieta on the east coast; while a naval anchorage was constructed at Tonolei Harbor near Buin on the southern coastal plain, along with anchorages on the Shortland Islands group.

The airfield at Kahili was known by the Japanese as Buin Airfield, and to its south was an airfield on Ballale Island in the Shortland Islands. These bases allowed the Japanese to conduct operations in the southern Solomon Islands and to attack the Allied lines of communication between the United States, Australia and the Southwest Pacific Area.

At the opening of the Allied offensives, their estimates of Japanese strength on Bougainville varied widely, ranging between 45,000 and 65,000 army, navy, and labour personnel. (Note: Rottman provides the figure of 45,000 while Gailey and Long state that there were 65,000 total Japanese personnel in and around Bougainville. Long's estimate is that of contemporary Australian intelligence officers, which he says was verified at the end of the war.) These forces constituted the Japanese 17th Army, commanded by General Harukichi Hyakutake. Hyukatake reported to General Hitoshi Imamura, commander of the Japanese Eighth Area Army, headquartered at Rabaul on New Britain. Naval command at Rabaul was the responsibility of Vice Admiral Jinichi Kusaka, commander Southeast Area Fleet. The level of cooperation between these two officers was greater than that usually found between the branches of the Japanese armed forces.

The 17th Infantry Group occupied Bougainville and consisted of the 81st Infantry Regiment and the III Battalion, 53rd Infantry Regiment under Major General Kesao Kijima. Elements of the 6th Division had responsibility for the island south of Tarina.

== Allied planning ==
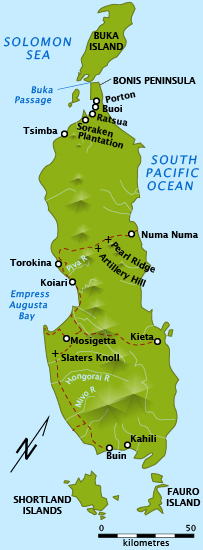
Map depicting the locations of key battles on Bougainville during 1944–45

=== Choice of Bougainville ===
Reduction of the main Japanese base at Rabaul was the ultimate goal of the Allied offensive in the Solomons. To achieve this, Allied planners formulated Operation Cartwheel. By 1943 Rabaul was within range of Allied heavy bombers, but a closer airfield was needed for light bombers and escort fighters. Thus, the entire island of Bougainville did not need to be occupied; only enough relatively flat land to support an airbase was required. According to historian Samuel Eliot Morison, this "was the one and only reason why the JCS authorized Halsey to seize a section of Bougainville: to establish forward airfields for strikes on Rabaul."

The area around Cape Torokina was determined to be an acceptable location. The Japanese were not there in force and had no airfield there. Empress Augusta Bay had a somewhat protected anchorage, and the physical barriers to the east of the cape – for instance the mountain ranges and thick jungle – meant that mounting a counterattack would be beyond the capabilities of the Japanese for weeks, if not months, which would allow the US forces to consolidate after landing and give them enough time to establish a strong perimeter. The preparation for landings at Cape Torokina became known as Operation Cherry Blossom.

=== Preparations for the landings ===
Bougainville lay within the Southwest Pacific Area, so operations were nominally under the command of General Douglas MacArthur, whose headquarters were in Brisbane, Australia. Although MacArthur had to approve all major moves, he gave planning and operational control to Admiral William F. Halsey, Commander U.S. Third Fleet, headquartered at Nouméa on New Caledonia. In mid-October, Halsey set 1 November 1943 as the date for the invasion of Bougainville.

By early October, it was clear to the Japanese that the Allies were planning a follow-up offensive to the Allied capture of the New Georgias, although the target was uncertain. The commander of the Japanese Combined Fleet, Admiral Mineichi Koga, flying his flag aboard the battleship Musashi from Truk Lagoon, sent all of his carrier aircraft to Rabaul. These planes would combine with the land-based air force already there and bomb Allied bases and supply routes as part of a plan the Japanese called Operation RO. In the event, this plan achieved very little besides further attrition to the Japanese air arm as the Japanese aircraft suffered heavy losses, which later prevented the Japanese aircraft from intervening against the US landings in the Gilbert and Marshall Islands.

To confuse the Japanese as to the Allies' real target, two other invasions were carried out. The Treasury Islands, just southwest of the Shortlands, were occupied 27 October by the 8th Brigade Group, 3rd New Zealand Division under the command of Brigadier Robert Row, and a temporary landing was effected on Choiseul, one of the major islands in the Solomons chain. Unlike on Guadalcanal and the New Georgias, Allied planners were unable to gain valuable intelligence from coastwatchers or small Australian Army detachments as the Japanese had driven them off the island long before plans for Operation Cherry Blossom began.

=== Forces allocated ===
Rear Admiral Theodore Wilkinson, Commander Third Fleet Amphibious Forces, was assigned by Halsey to direct the landings at Cape Torokina from aboard his flagship, the attack transport George Clymer. The ships under Wilkinson's command would disembark the I Marine Amphibious Corps, commanded by Major General Alexander Vandegrift, victor of the land campaign on Guadalcanal. Vandegrift's force, a total of 14,321 men, consisted of the 3rd Marine Division (reinforced), under Major General Allen H. Turnage, the U.S. Army's 37th Infantry Division, under Major General Robert S. Beightler, and the Advance Naval Base Unit No. 7.

== Landings at Cape Torokina ==
=== First day: 1–2 November 1943 ===
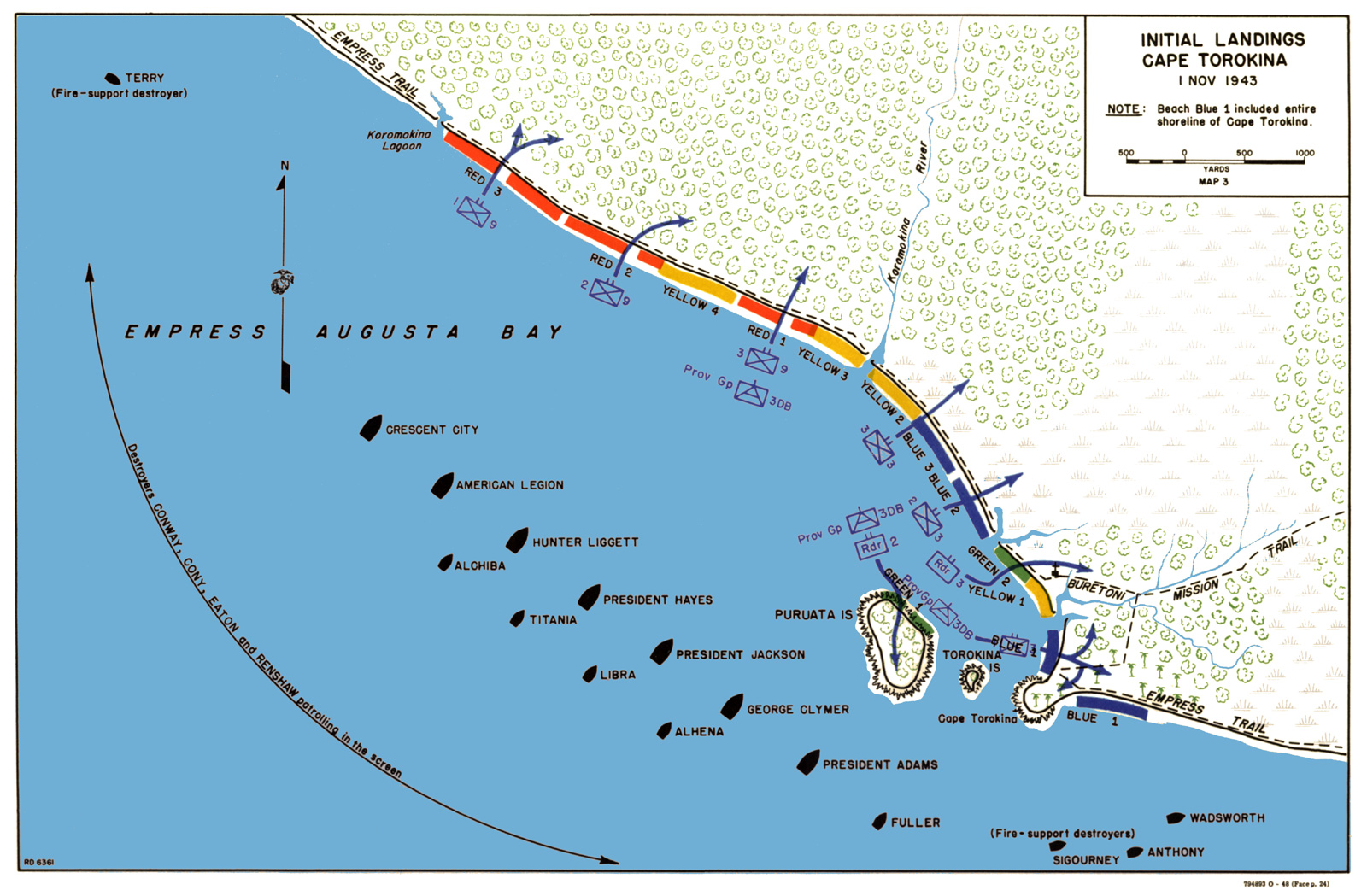
Landing beaches near Cape Torokina

Three groups of transports converged in Empress Augusta Bay on the morning of 1 November. The existing maps of the Bougainville coast that the Allies possessed were highly unreliable German Admiralty charts from about 1890. A few corrections had been made by reconnaissance flights and submarine scouting, but some longitudes were still wrong. Indeed, Morison recounts that "near the end of the approach, when the navigating officer of a transport was asked by the captain for his ship's position, he replied, 'About three miles inland, sir!'" Morison further recounts the scene of the landing in the following passage:

To the forces, as they approached, Empress Augusta Bay presented a magnificent but somewhat terrifying spectacle. Behind the curved sweep of the shore line, a heavy, dark green jungle...swept up over foothills and crumpled ridges to the cordillera which was crowned by a smoking volcano, Mount Baranga, 8,650 feet above sea level...It was wilder and more majestic scenery than anyone had yet witnessed in the South Pacific...

From the difficult landings at Guadalcanal and the New Georgias, Admiral Wilkinson had learned a significant lesson about the necessity of rapid unloading and getting his slow, vulnerable transports away from the landing area. To this end, he loaded his transports only half full and his cargo ships one-quarter full, and made sure that 30% of the troops on the beach assisted in unloading. The Japanese, having been taken by surprise, were unable to mount an air assault on the invasion fleet. Wilkinson, grateful that his transports were able to land almost the entire troop contingent and a large amount of materiel unmolested by air attack, ordered them out of the area around sundown.

=== Japanese response ===
Japanese forces around the landing area were limited to no more than platoon strength, as they had not expected an attack in the area, and their logistics system was unable to support greater numbers. When word of the landings reached Rabaul, Vice Admiral Tomoshige Samejima, Commander of the Japanese Eighth Fleet, immediately embarked 1,000 troops from the II Battalion, 54th Infantry Regiment onto five destroyer-transports at Rabaul and sent them to Cape Torokina. Escorting the transports was a force of two heavy cruisers, two light cruisers and six destroyers led by Vice Admiral Sentaro Omori. During the night voyage to Torokina, the Japanese ships were spotted by an American submarine and possibly by a search plane. Concerned that he had lost the element of surprise, Omori radioed Samejima to ask permission to send the slow-moving transports back to Rabaul but to continue with the combat ships to attack the American transports that he assumed were still in Empress Augusta Bay. Samejima concurred, and Omori pressed ahead with his cruisers and destroyers.

At the same time, Rear Admiral Stanton Merrill was steaming toward the Bay with four light cruisers and eight destroyers. The two forces met in the early morning hours of 2 November in the Battle of Empress Augusta Bay, in which the Japanese lost the light cruiser Sendai and the destroyer Hatsukaze.

=== Carrier raid on Rabaul ===
Admiral Koga was unwilling to risk his precious aircraft carriers, so he decided to dispatch seven heavy cruisers to Rabaul. These arrived on 3 November. News of the cruisers' arrival in the area of operations greatly concerned Halsey: the Bougainville beachhead was still quite vulnerable, and he had no heavy cruisers to oppose a bombardment. Taking a huge gamble, he ordered the only carrier force under his immediate command, Task Force 38 under Rear Admiral Frederick C. Sherman, to cripple or sink as much of the combat shipping at Rabaul as possible. The resulting air strike, launched from Sherman's fleet carrier Saratoga and light carrier Princeton on 5 November—with fighter escorts being provided by land-based aircraft from Air Solomons command and followed up by land-based aircraft from the Fifth Air Force— sank no ships but inflicted enough damage to convince Koga to withdraw the heavy cruisers, without having been able to attack the beachhead.

A second raid was launched on 11 November with aircraft from the Essex, Bunker Hill and Independence, along with a sizeable force of land-based B-24 bombers. The bombers proved ineffective, but the carrier-based aircraft achieved a degree of success, sinking a destroyer and damaging three destroyers and two cruisers.

== November 1943: expanding the beachhead ==
=== Early November ===
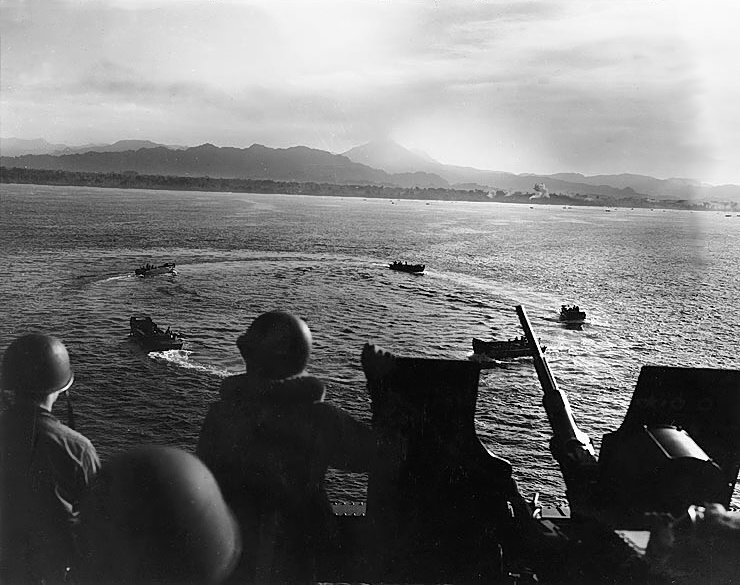
Landing craft circling off Cape Torokina

Defense and expansion of the US lodgment at Cape Torokina involved protracted and often bitter jungle warfare, with many casualties resulting from malaria and other tropical diseases. Except for patrol skirmishes, all the major combat to expand the beachhead occurred in the Marines sector. From 6 to 19 November, the remaining regiment of the 3rd Marine Division and the US Army 37th Infantry Division were landed, and the beachhead gradually expanded. On their third attempt, the Japanese successfully landed four destroyer-loads of men just beyond the western limit of the American beachhead before dawn on 7 November. Despite the presence of PT boats operating out of Puruata Island, the Japanese effected this landing undetected by the Americans. Nevertheless, the Marines annihilated this force the next day in the Battle of Koromokina Lagoon. In conjunction with the landing forces, the Japanese 23rd Infantry Regiment, which was assigned to the 6th Division, also began attacking the US forces with some success on 7 November before being beaten back the following day.

While escorting one of the invasion echelons to the Torokina beachhead on 9 November, Morison recounts that some of Merrill's sailors witnessed an extraordinary incident that highlighted some of the extreme cultural differences at play in the Pacific:

On their way north, the bluejackets topside in destroyer Spence were goggle-eyed at an exhibition of Japanese bushido. Ordered to investigate a life raft, they observed what appeared to be seven bodies in it. The seven bodies suddenly sat up and started talking. One of them, apparently the officer, broke out a 7.7-mm machine gun, which each man in succession placed in his mouth, while the officer fired a round which shot the back of the man's head off. After six had been bumped off, the officer stood up, addressed a short speech in Japanese to Spence's commanding officer on the bridge, and then shot himself.

African American soldiers advancing through the jungle, while on patrol in Japanese territory off the Numa-Numa Trail, 1 May 1944

Parts of two Marine Raider battalions drove away Japanese who were blocking the Piva branch of the Numa Numa Trail in the 8–9 November Battle for Piva Trail. The Marines then selected sites in the area for two airstrips (the fighter strip at the beach was already being built). Also on 9 November, Major General Roy S. Geiger took over command of the I Marine Amphibious Corps from Vandegrift. Four days later, he assumed command of the entire Torokina beachhead area from Wilkinson. By this time, the Perimeter, as it was called, covered about 7,000 yards of beach front and had a circumference of about 16,000 yards. The trails to new airstrip sites had to be cleared, and Turnage assigned this task to the 21st Marine Regiment. A Japanese ambush in the area resulted in the 13–14 November Battle of the Coconut Grove, which ended with the Marines gaining control of the point where the Numa Numa and East West Trails crossed.

Throughout early November, the Japanese carried out air raids against the US forces around Torokina; however, by 17 November losses were such that the Japanese 1st Carrier Division, which had begun with 370 planes on 1 November, was withdrawn back to Truk. The US forces were thereby able to gradually expand their perimeter out to 5.0–6.2 miles (8–10 km), eventually capturing two airfields with which they could subsequently launch their own attacks against Rabaul. Following this, the Japanese troops on Bougainville essentially became isolated.

=== Late November ===
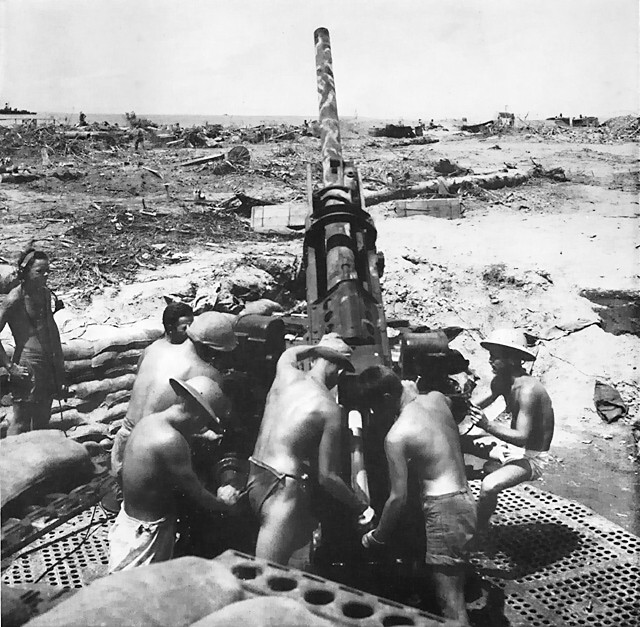
Antiaircraft gunners at Cape Torokina

At Rabaul, Imamura was still convinced that the Allies did not mean to stay long at Torokina—he was sure it was just a stepping stone. He thus had no interest in mounting a decisive counterattack on the Allied beachhead using the substantial number of troops he already had in the southern part of Bougainville. Instead, he reinforced the Buka Island area, just off the north coast of Bougainville Island, believing it to be the Allies' real target. Thus, the Japanese army repeated the error of Guadalcanal, while the navy could not convince Imamura of the Americans' real intentions.

The 18–25 November Battle of Piva Forks effectively wiped out an entire Japanese infantry regiment. Even so, the beachhead was still not an entirely safe place. The day after the end of the Piva Forks action, as the sixth echelon of the invasion force was unloading at the beachhead, Japanese artillery fired on the landing ships, inflicting casualties. The Marines silenced these guns the following day.

On 25 November, as the Battle of Piva Forks was ending, the Battle of Cape St. George took place in the waters between Buka and New Ireland. Three destroyer transports full of troops, escorted by two destroyers, all under the command of Captain Kiyoto Kagawa, were on their way to reinforce Buka. Halsey directed five destroyers under Captain Arleigh Burke to intercept. The encounter resulted in the sinking of destroyers Ōnami, Makinami and Yūgumo, as well as the death of Kagawa. No hits were scored on Burke's vessels.

The battle was not completely one sided, though. On 28–29 November, in an effort to block reinforcements from the Japanese 23rd Infantry Regiment, the 1st Marine Parachute Battalion carried out a raid on Koiari, about 9.3 miles (15 km) east of Torokina. After landing unopposed, the Japanese counterattacked heavily and the Marines, facing being overrun, had to be rescued by landing craft, which took three attempts to get ashore.

== December 1943: securing the perimeter ==
Under extremely difficult conditions, the Naval Construction Battalions (CBs or Seabees) and a group of New Zealand engineers carried out work on the three airstrips. The fighter strip at the beach was the first to begin full-time operations with the first flights taking place on 10 December. The Japanese Army command at Rabaul was certain that the Allies would be moving on from Torokina; Imamura ordered a build-up of the defenses at Buin, on the southern tip of Bougainville.

In November and December the Japanese emplaced field artillery on the high ground around the beachhead, concentrated in a group of hills along the Torokina River overlooking the eastern perimeter. They shelled the beachhead, targeting the airstrips and the supply dumps. The 3rd Marine Division extended its lines to include the hills in a series of operations that lasted from 9–27 December. One hill, dubbed "Hellzapoppin Ridge", was a natural fortress. Overlooking the beachhead, it was 300 feet (91 m) long, with steep slopes and a narrow crest. The Japanese constructed extensive positions on the reverse slopes using natural and artificial camouflage. The 21st Marines attacked Hellzapoppin Ridge but were driven off on 12 December. Several air strikes missed the narrow ridge completely. Finally, co-ordinated air, artillery, and infantry attacks resulted in the capture of the ridge on 18 December. In the days that followed, the 21st Marines were also involved in fighting around Hill 600A, which was captured by 24 December 1943.

On 15 December, the I Marine Amphibious Corps and General Geiger were replaced by the US Army's XIV Corps, led by Major General Oscar W. Griswold, the victor of the land campaign on New Georgia. On 28 December, the 3rd Marine Division, exhausted because most of the fighting had taken place in its sector, was replaced by the Army's Americal Division under Major General John R. Hodge. The 37th Division (Army), was then placed under Griswold's XIV Corps.

== January–February 1944: encircling Rabaul ==
=== Aerial reduction of Rabaul ===
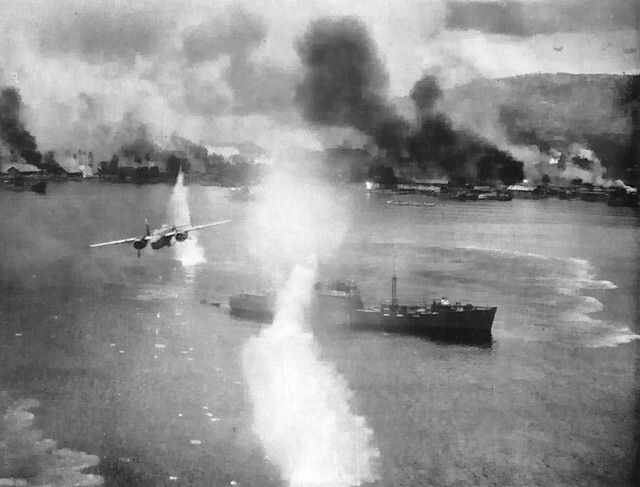
Air raid in Simpson Harbor

Rabaul had already been raided multiple times between 12 October and 2 November by the heavy bombers of General George C. Kenney's Allied Air Forces Southwest Pacific Area. Significant damage was done to ground installations, although the Japanese adapted by moving aircraft facilities underground. Only low-flying techniques such as dive bombing and glide bombing could achieve the accuracy required to pinpoint these installations, as well as neutralising anti-aircraft weapons and attacking vessels in the harbor. To achieve this, the Allies began constructing several airstrips on Bougainville that would allow them to use their smaller and more manoeuvrable aircraft against Rabaul. The fighter strip on the beach at Torokina began operations on 10 December, while the inland bomber strip "Piva Uncle" followed on Christmas Day, and the inland fighter strip "Piva Yoke" on 22 January.

Major General Ralph J. Mitchell, USMC, took over the command of all land-based planes in the theater, called Air Command, Solomons (AirSols), on 20 November. Once the three airstrips in the Torokina Perimeter became fully functional, Mitchell moved AirSols headquarters there from Munda on New Georgia Island. The first raids by AirSols aircraft had limited success. Japanese anti-aircraft fire, especially from ships, had improved greatly since Kenney's raids and inflicted significant damage on the planes. The Americans developed new formations and tactics that brought about increasing attrition among the Japanese fighter arm. The Japanese navy could no longer risk exposing its ships to the relentless air attacks, and by late January, Kusaka had banned all shipping except barges from Simpson Harbor, which removed any remaining naval threat to the Torokina beachhead.

=== Capture of the Green Islands ===
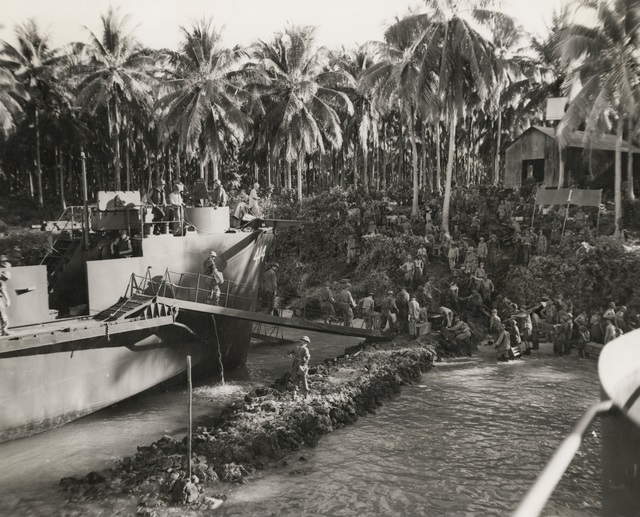
New Zealand troops land on Green Island, 16 February 1944

The Joint Chiefs of Staff had determined that Rabaul was to be encircled, with invasions of the Admiralty Islands and Kavieng on the northern tip of the island of New Ireland, to begin 1 April at the earliest. Anxious to maintain offensive momentum, Halsey was unwilling to leave his forces idle until then. To that end, and to provide yet another airfield close to Rabaul, Halsey ordered his amphibious forces to invade the Green Islands, a group of small coral atolls about 115 miles east of Rabaul. Reconnaissance missions determined that the native Melanesians there were well-disposed toward the Europeans and had been alienated by the Japanese. As a result, Allied planners determined that no preliminary bombing or shelling would be carried out.

On 15 February, Wilkinson landed a contingent of New Zealanders from the 3rd Division under Major General Harold E. Barrowclough. Experience gained from previous landings, coupled with detailed staff work, meant that the landings were completed with relative efficiency. In addition, interference from Japanese planes was minimal. Morison attributes this to previous losses inflicted against the Japanese air arm, writing that the fact such a large fleet "could set thousands of troops ashore with impunity only 115 miles from Rabaul proved what good work AirSols had already accomplished."

With the capture of the Green Islands, the Japanese base was no longer able to project air power to interfere in attacks on Rabaul. The Greens provided a site for a PT boat base, and during the night of 1 March PT-319 entered Simpson Harbor and went undetected by the Japanese. This would have been inconceivable just two months earlier. In addition, a detachment of Seabees constructed an airfield, putting the Japanese base at Kavieng in range of AirSols planes for the first time. From 8 March AirSols bombers began flying unescorted to Rabaul. In describing the effect, Morison writes: "it is significant that the splendid harbor which in October 1943 had held some 300,000 tons of enemy shipping, and had sheltered powerful task forces of the Japanese Navy, was reduced to a third-rate barge depot."

== March 1944: Japanese counterattack ==
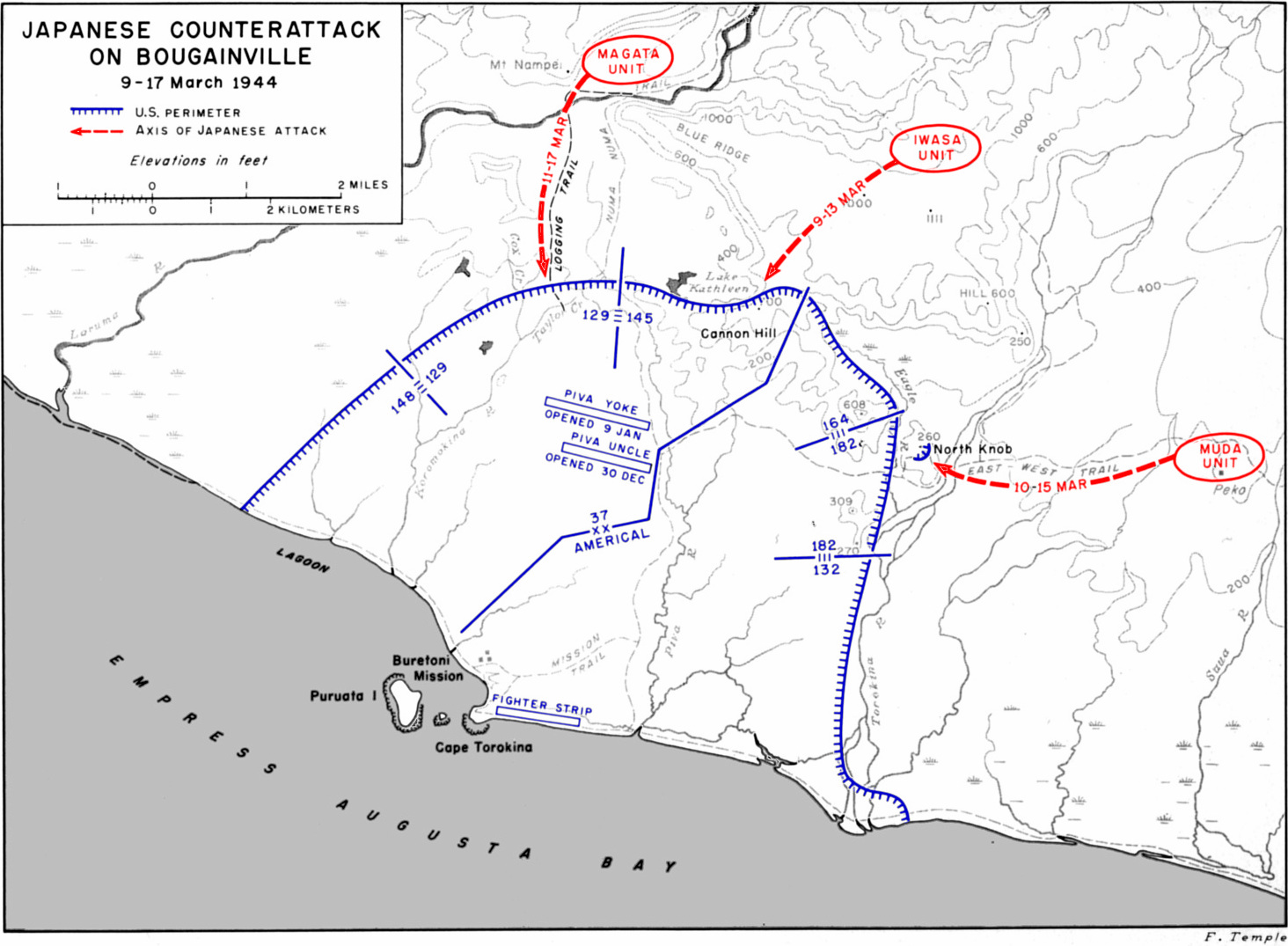
The Japanese counterattack on Bougainville between 9 and 17 March 1944

=== Preparations ===
Hyakutake commanded about 40,000 men of the 17th Army. There were also about 20,000 naval personnel in the southern part of the island under Vice Admiral Tomoshige Samejima. One of the units in Hyakutake's command, the 6th Infantry Division under Lieutenant General Masatane Kanda, was reputed to be the toughest in the Imperial Japanese Army. Initially, Hyakutake was not convinced of the Allied intent to remain permanently at Torokina and as a result remained on a defensive posture. The resulting delay in Japanese offensive action gave Griswold plenty of time to deploy his men in suitable defensive positions.

In December 1943, Hyakutake resolved to launch an attack on the US forces around the perimeter, and throughout the early months of 1944 his staff made the necessary preparations and plans. Hyakutake's attack would employ the 12,000 men of the 6th Infantry plus 3,000 reserves. His faith in the ultimate victory was such that he planned on taking Griswold's surrender at the Torokina airstrip on 17 March. The Japanese dragged the greatest concentration of field artillery they had yet assembled onto the ridges overlooking the perimeter. Griswold decided that allowing the Japanese to hold these ridges was better than stretching his own lines thin by occupying them himself.

On the American side, Hodge's Americal Division and Beightler's 37th Infantry Division manned the Perimeter, while the 3rd Marine Defense Battalion and the US Army 49th Coast Artillery Battalion protected the beachhead. Griswold had learned on New Georgia that waiting for the Japanese to attack was a much surer way to victory than undertaking his own offensive operations in a jungle.

=== Battle of the Perimeter ===
As far as the press and the American public were concerned, the war had moved on from Bougainville. As Morison writes, "the struggle for the Perimeter went almost unnoticed outside the Pacific." Hyakutake opened his all-out effort to throw the Americans off Bougainville, which came to be known simply as The Counterattack, on 9 March, and his men succeeded in capturing Hill 700 and Cannon Hill; the 37th Division recaptured these positions on the afternoon of 12 March. Griswold gave credit to the destroyers that provided bombardment of the Japanese positions, suppressing their attempts at reinforcement.

Hyakutake's second thrust was delayed until 12 March. The Japanese advanced through a deep ravine to approach the Piva Yoke fighter strip, and succeeded in penetrating the Perimeter at one point. Beightler responded by sending combined tanks and infantry to drive them back. Also, Japanese artillery that had been bombarding all three American airstrips was silenced by AirSols bombers. This action ended on 13 March. Hyakutake attempted twice more to penetrate the perimeter, on 15 and 17 March but was driven back both times. The Japanese mounted a final attack on the night of 23–24 March, which made some progress but was then thrown back. On 27 March, the Americal Division drove the Japanese off of Hill 260, and the battle came to a close.

During the Battle of the Perimeter, AirSols aircraft continued bombing Rabaul completely reducing its offensive capability. According to Morison, "...AirSols delivered at least one strike on Rabaul every day that weather permitted. An average of 85 tons of bombs was dropped on the area daily from 20 February to 15 May – a total of 7,410 tons by almost 9,400 sorties."

=== Aftermath ===
Two american soldiers cleaning their rifles in bivouac area alongside the East West Trail, 4 April 1944

The Japanese army, having taken heavy losses during these operations, withdrew the majority of its force into the deep interior and to the north and south ends of Bougainville. On 5 April the Americal Division's 132nd Infantry Regiment, after establishing patrol sweeps along Empress Augusta Bay, successfully launched an attack to capture the Japanese-held village of Mavavia. Two days later while continuing a sweep for enemy forces, the regiment encountered prepared enemy defences where they destroyed about 20 Japanese pillboxes using pole charges and bazookas. Later, the 132nd, together with elements of the Fiji Defence Force, was tasked with securing the heights west of Saua River. The Allied troops captured Hills 155, 165, 500, and 501 in fierce fighting that lasted until 18 April, when the last of the Japanese defenders were killed or driven off.

The Americans were reinforced by the 93rd Infantry Division, the first African American infantry unit to see action in World War II. The Japanese, isolated and cut off from outside assistance, primarily concentrated on survival, including the development of farms throughout the island. According to Morison, amongst the Japanese troops "morale fell deplorably ... after the loss of the Battle of the Perimeter; Admiral Takeda, in his narrative, notes robberies, insubordination and even mutiny. Hundreds of soldiers deserted and wandered through the jungle, living on anything they could find, even on snakes, rats and crocodiles."

The supply situation became so bad for the Japanese that, according to Gailey, "the normal rice ration of 750 grams of rice for each soldier was cut in April 1944 to 250 grams, and beginning in September there was no rice ration. A large portion of the available army and naval personnel had to be put to work growing food. Allied pilots took delight in dropping napalm on these garden plots whenever possible."

Australian intelligence officers, after studying records, estimated that 8,200 Japanese troops had been killed in combat during the American phase of operations, while a further 16,600 had died of disease or malnutrition. Of those killed or wounded in combat, the large majority had come during the attack on the US-held perimeter around Torokina, with Japanese losses amounting to 5,400 killed and 7,100 wounded before Imamura cancelled the attack.

== Australian phase: November 1944 – August 1945 ==
=== Strategic decisions ===
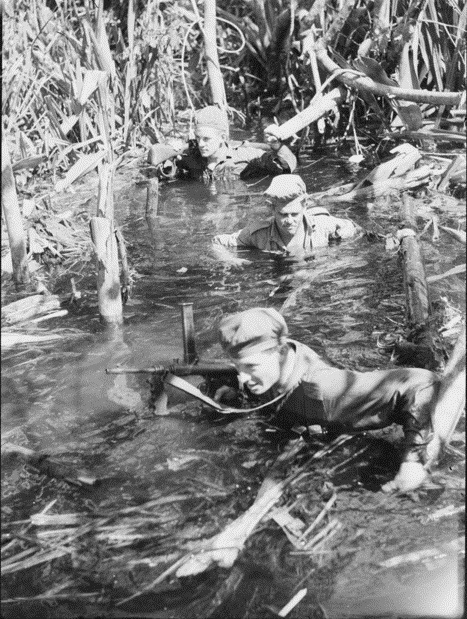
Australian troops from the 42nd Battalion patrol on Bougainville, January 1945

The invasion of the Philippines had been scheduled for January 1945, but the rapid pace of Allied victories in the Pacific caused MacArthur to bring forward the Philippines operation to October 1944. MacArthur would need all the ground troops he could get for the Leyte landings, so by mid-July MacArthur had decided to withdraw Griswold's XIV Corps from Bougainville for rest and refit, to be replaced by the Australian II Corps.

The Australian government and military chose to conduct aggressive operations on Bougainville with the goal of destroying the Japanese garrison. This decision was motivated by a desire to bring the campaign to a conclusion and so free up troops to be used elsewhere, liberate Australian territory and the inhabitants of the island from Japanese rule, and demonstrate that Australian forces were playing an active role in the war.

=== Handover ===
Lieutenant General Sir Stanley Savige's Australian II Corps was a force of just over 30,000 men. It consisted of the Australian 3rd Division (7th, 15th and 29th Brigades) under the command of Major General William Bridgeford, as well as the 11th Brigade and the 23rd Brigade.

On 6 October, the first elements of the headquarters detachment of the 3rd Division landed. By mid-November, the 7th Brigade had relieved the U.S. 129th and 145th Infantry Regiments. On 22 November, Savige formally took command of Allied operations on Bougainville from Griswold. By 12 December, the replacement of frontline American troops by Australians was complete, and with the exception of a few service troops all American personnel had departed by 1 February 1945. The 3rd Division and 11th Brigade, reinforced by the Fiji Infantry Regiment, were posted to Bougainville. The 23rd Brigade garrisoned the neighbouring islands.

=== Australian offensive operations ===
The Australians determined that Japanese forces on Bougainville, numbering approximately 40,000, still had approximately 20% of their personnel in forward positions and that although understrength, were organized in combat-capable formations, including the 38th Independent Mixed Brigade and General Kanda's tough 6th Division. Savige issued his instructions on 23 December. Offensive operations would consist of three separate drives:

- In the north, the 11th Brigade would force the Japanese into the narrow Bonis Peninsula and destroy them.
- In the centre, the enemy was to be driven off Pearl Ridge, a feature from which both coasts of the 30-mile-wide island could be seen. From there, aggressive patrols could be launched to disrupt Japanese communications along the east coast.
- The main Australian drive would take place in the south where the bulk of the Japanese forces (Kanda's 6th Division) was located. It was to this goal that Savige assigned Bridgeford's 3rd Division.

==== Central front ====
The Battle of Pearl Ridge (30–31 December) revealed how far Japanese morale and stamina had fallen. The ridge was taken by a single battalion of Australians, suffering few casualties in the process. It was afterwards discovered that the position had been held by 500 defenders rather than the 80–90 that had originally been estimated. Activity in the central sector was from that point on confined to patrols along the Numa Numa Trail.

==== Northern front ====
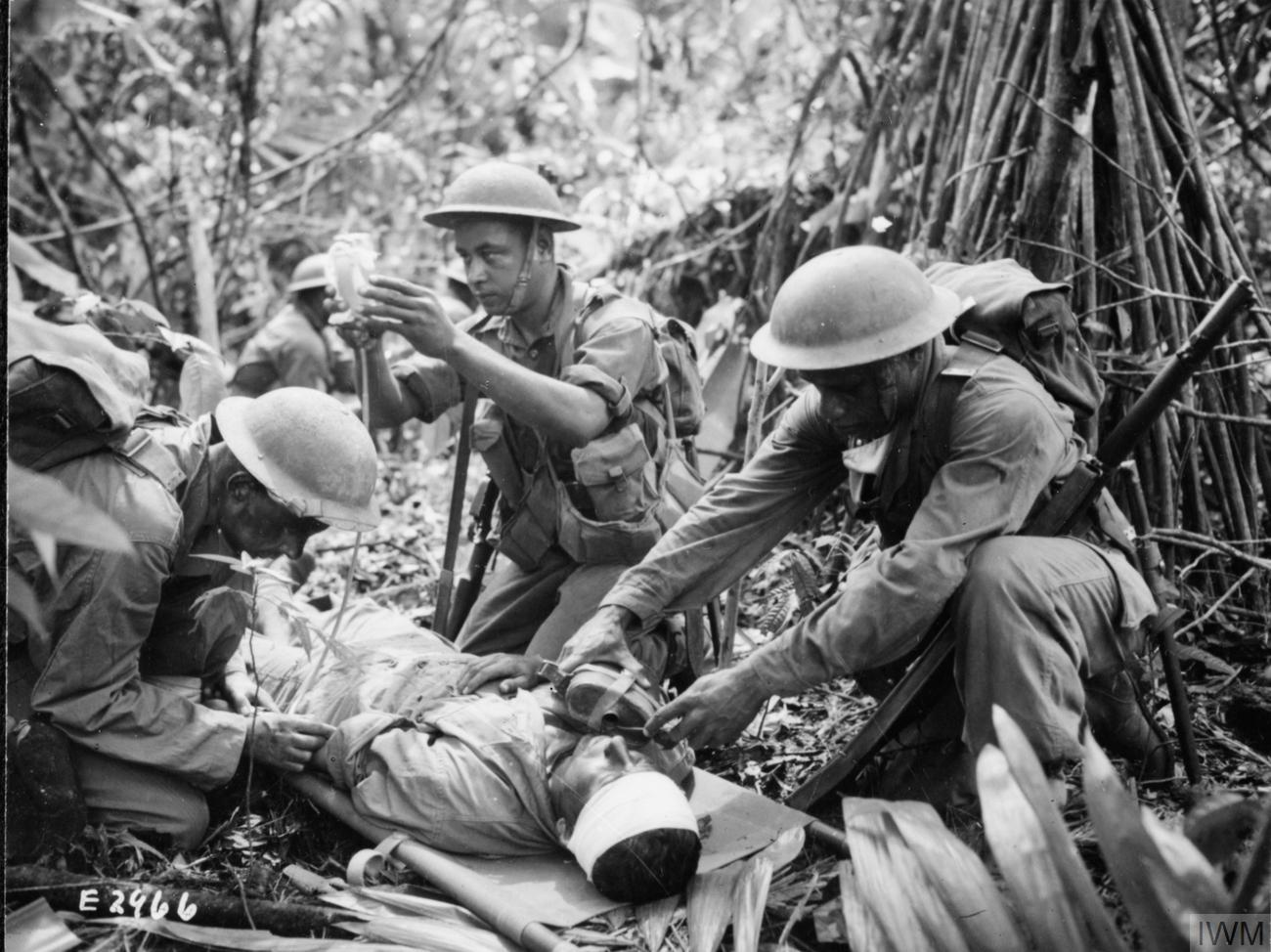
A Fijian medical orderly administers an emergency plasma transfusion during heavy fighting on Bougainville.

Pursuant to Savige's 31 December order to begin operations in the northwestern sector at the first opportunity, General J.R. Stevensons's 11th Brigade advanced along the coast, reaching the village of Rukussia by mid-January 1945. However, since the coastal plain was dominated by Tsimba Ridge, the Genga River could not be crossed in force until the Japanese had been dislodged from the crest of that ridge. In the resulting Battle of Tsimba Ridge, the Australians encountered determined resistance in heavily fortified positions, and it was not until 9 February that the last Japanese dug in on the western edge of the ridge were rooted out.

During the remainder of February and March the Australians drove the Japanese north past Soraken Plantation. Eventually, the approximately 1,800 Japanese fell back to a strong defensive line across the neck of the Bonis Peninsula. Because the 11th Brigade was exhausted from three weeks of jungle combat, frontal assaults were ruled out and an attempt was made to outflank the Japanese positions with an amphibious landing on 8 June. However, the landing force found itself pinned down and on the verge of being exterminated. Although Japanese losses in the resulting Battle of Porton Plantation were probably higher, the defenders received a boost in morale, and the Australian command called off offensive operations in this sector for the time being. It was instead decided to contain the Japanese along the Ratsua front while resources were diverted to the southern sector for the drive towards Buin.

==== Southern front ====
On 28 December, Savige issued orders to the 29th Brigade to begin the drive toward the principal Japanese concentration around Buin. After a month's fighting, the Australians were in control of an area extending twelve miles south of the Perimeter and six miles inland. Employing barges to outflank the Japanese, they entered the village of Mosigetta by 11 February 1945 and Barara by 20 February. The Australians then cleared an area near Mawaraka for an airstrip.

By 5 March, the Japanese had been driven off a small knoll overlooking the Buin Road; the Australians named this promontory after Private C.R. Slater who had been wounded during the fighting. During the 28 March – 6 April Battle of Slater's Knoll, the Japanese launched a strong counterattack during which several determined Japanese attacks against this position were repulsed with heavy losses. In Gailey's words, "General Kanda's offensive was a disaster ... Indeed, the entire series of attacks by the Japanese is as inexplicable as the Australians' desire to conquer all the island." Having learned a costly lesson about the ineffectiveness of banzai charges, Kanda pulled his men back to a defensive perimeter around Buin and reinforced them with the garrisons from the Shortlands and the Fauros. The concentration was not complete until July.

Savige took two weeks to allow his forces to recuperate and resupply before restarting the drive on Buin. After repelling more futile Japanese attacks in the 17 April – 22 May Battle of the Hongorai River, his men crossed the Hari and Mobai Rivers. However, shortly after reaching the Mivo River their advance came to a halt as torrential rain and flooding washed away many of the bridges and roads upon which the Australian line of communications depended. This rendered large scale infantry operations impossible for almost a month, and it was not until late July and into early August that the Australians were able to resume patrolling across the Mivo River. Before Savige could mount a substantial assault, news arrived of the dropping of the atomic bombs, after which the Australian forces mainly only conducted limited patrolling actions.

=== Conclusion ===
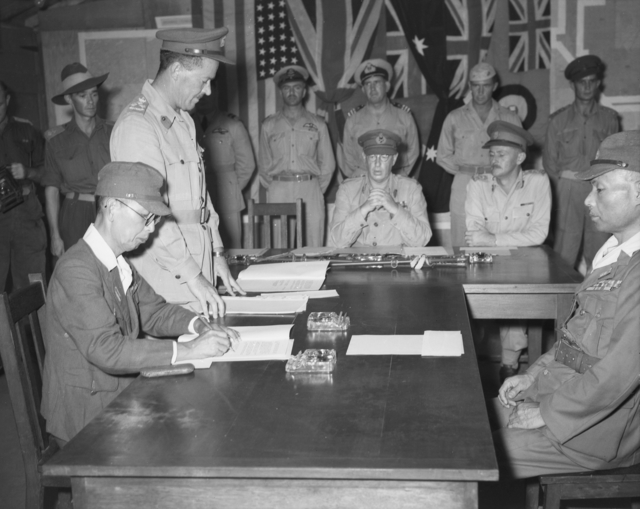
8 September 1945: General Masatane Kanda surrenders remaining Japanese forces on Bougainville

Combat operations on Bougainville ended with the surrender of Japanese forces on Bougainville on 21 August 1945. The Empire of Japan surrendered in Tokyo Bay on 2 September 1945.

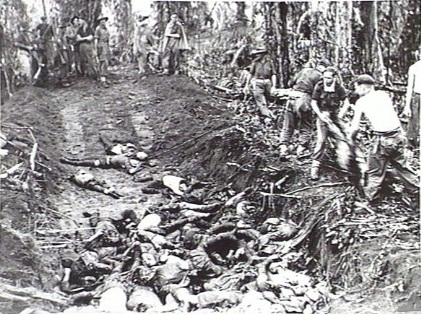
Japanese dead after the Battle of Slater's Knoll, 6 April 1945

The last phase of the campaign saw 516 Australians killed and another 1,572 wounded. 8,500 Japanese were killed at the same time, while disease and malnutrition killed another 9,800 and some 23,500 troops and labourers surrendered at the end of the war. Of the casualties suffered during the second phase of the campaign, historian Harry Gailey writes: "it was a terrible toll for an island whose possession after March 1944 was of no consequence in bringing the war to a close ... That the Australian soldiers performed so well when they had to know that what they were doing was in the larger sphere unnecessary and unappreciated at home says much for the courage and the discipline of the ordinary Australian infantryman".

In contrast, Australian historian Karl James has argued that the 1944–45 Bougainville campaign was justifiable given that it could not be known at the time that Japan would surrender in August 1945, and there was a need to both free up Australian forces for operations elsewhere and liberate the island's civilian population. Of the civilian population, according to Hank Nelson estimates that the Bougainvillean population declined by 25% after 1943 from over 52,000 in 1943 to under 40,000 by 1946.

Three Victoria Crosses were awarded during the campaign. Corporal Sefanaia Sukanaivalu of Fiji received the award posthumously for his bravery at Mawaraka on 23 June 1944; he is the only Fijian to have received the award to date. Corporal Reg Rattey received the award for his actions during the fighting around Slater's Knoll on 22 March 1945, while Private Frank Partridge earned his in one of the final actions of the campaign on 24 July 1945 during fighting along the Ratsua front. Partridge was the only member of the militia to receive the Victoria Cross, which was also the last of the war awarded to an Australian.

== Namesake ==
The U.S. Navy escort carrier USS Bougainville (CVE-100), in commission from 1944 to 1946, was named for the Bougainville campaign.
