= USS Spence =

Fletcher-class destroyer

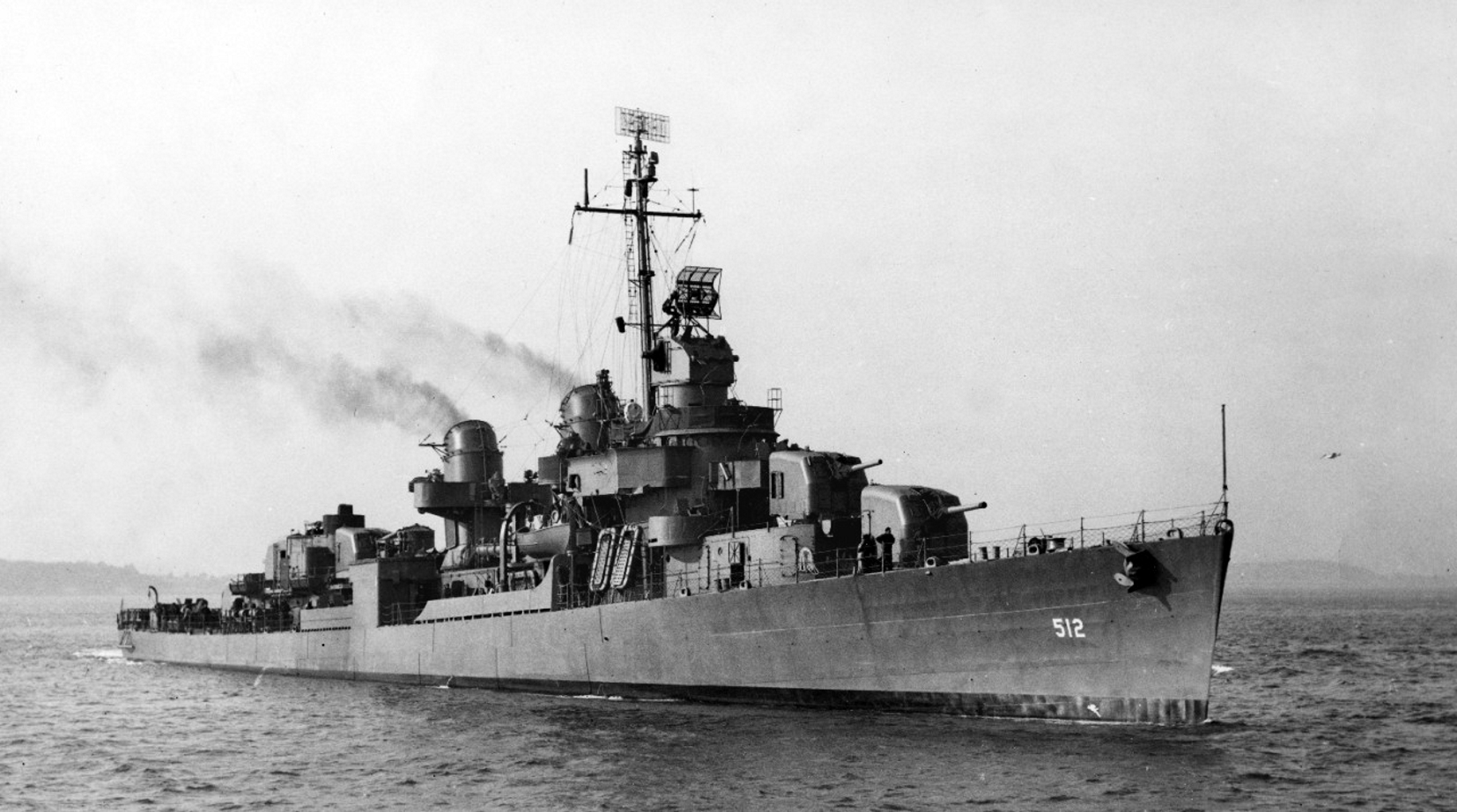
- USS Spence

History

United States
- Namesake: Daniel Spence
- Builder: Bath Iron Works
- Laid down: 18 May 1942
- Launched: 27 October 1942
- Commissioned: 8 January 1943
- Stricken: 19 January 1945
- Fate: Foundered in Typhoon Cobra, 18 December 1944

General characteristics
- Class & type: Fletcher-class destroyer
- Displacement: 2,050 tons
- Length: 376 ft 6 in (114.7 m)
- Beam: 39 ft 8 in (12.1 m)
- Draft: 17 ft 9 in (5.4 m)
- Propulsion: 60,000 shp (45 MW); 2 propellers
- Speed: 35 knots (65 km/h; 40 mph)
- Range: 6500 nmi. (12,000 km) at 15 kt
- Complement: 336
- Armament: 5 × single Mk 12 5 in (127 mm)/38 guns; 5 × twin 40 mm (1.6 in) Bofors AA guns; 7 × single 20 mm (0.8 in) Oerlikon AA guns; 2 × quintuple 21 in (533 mm) torpedo tubes; 6 × single depth charge throwers; 2 × depth charge racks

USS Spence (DD-512), a Fletcher-class destroyer, was laid down on 18 May 1942 by the Bath Iron Works, Bath, Maine; launched on 27 October 1942; sponsored by Mrs. Eben Learned; and commissioned on 8 January 1943. The ship was named for Robert T. Spence, superintendent of the construction of USS Ontario (1813), and captain of USS Cyane (1815).

Spence conducted her shakedown cruise out of Guantanamo Bay from 8 to 28 February. She then served as an escort in the Atlantic and Caribbean and had convoy duty in the Casablanca area in April. She was routed to the west coast and, on 25 July, got underway from San Francisco for Pearl Harbor, to serve in the Pacific against the Japanese in World War II.

== History ==
Spence sailed on 25 August as a unit of Task Group (TG) 1.2 consisting of the light carriers USS Princeton and USS Belleau Wood to support troops who took possession of Baker Island on 1 September. On 13 September, she proceeded to Efate and arrived at Havannah Harbor on 18 September.

Spence was attached to Destroyer Division (DesDiv) 46 of Destroyer Squadron (DesRon) 23. The squadron sailed on 22 September for Tulagi, Solomon Islands. On the 28th, she set a surface craft on fire with her main batteries near Kolombangara and then patrolled between that island and Vella Lavella. On the night of 1 and 2 October, Spence was with a force off Vella Lavella to interdict Japanese shipping and helped to destroy 20 Japanese barges. The DD then made two escort runs from Tulagi to Purvis Bay during the first part of the month and ended October supporting landings on the Treasury Islands.

Capt. Arleigh A. Burke assumed command of DesRon 23 on 23 October, and the squadron became known as the "Little Beavers." On 1 November, Spence participated in the bombardment of Buka and Bonis airfields and of Japanese positions in the Shortland Islands to support the Landings at Cape Torokina, Bougainville.

=== Battle of Empress Augusta Bay ===
In the early hours of 2 November, Task Force 39 intercepted an enemy force consisting of two heavy cruisers (Haguro and Myōkō), two light cruisers (Agano and Sendai) with six destroyers steaming towards Empress Augusta Bay. At 02:31, Spence made radar contact at 16 miles (26 km). While closing the range from her target, Spence was hit by a 6-inch (152 mm) shell which hit below the water line. This had to have been fired from Agano, as she was the only Japanese warship present armed with 6-inch (152 mm) guns. However, the shell did not explode and only caused minor flooding. Spence charged on despite the damage.

The destroyer fired a spread of torpedoes at a ship 3,000 yards (3,000 m) away and was rewarded with black smoke pouring from the target. As Spence retired to rendezvous with DesDiv 45, she spotted another Japanese force 4,000 yards (4,000 m) away. She opened fire, was "on target," and watched one ship stop dead in the water and burn fiercely. Since Spence was low on ammunition, she called upon DesDiv 45 to pour shells into the ill-fated destroyer Hatsukaze which sank stern first. Sendai was also sunk in the engagement by combined US cruiser gunfire.

When daybreak came, so did between 70 and 80 enemy aircraft. Effective anti-aircraft fire resulted in the Japanese losing over 20 planes while scoring only two hits on USS Montpelier.

Spence retired to Purvis Bay on 3 November. The next day, she called at Tulagi and sailed with USS Nashville for Kula Gulf. On the afternoon of the 5th, she was operating northwest of the Treasury Islands when she was attacked by enemy aircraft. One plane dropped three bombs, but the closest fell 75 yards (69 m) off Spence's starboard beam.

=== Battle of Cape St. George ===
For the next three weeks, Spence performed patrol and escort duty in the Port Purvis-Kula Gulf area. On 24 November, the squadron was refueling in Hathorn Sound when ordered northwest of Buka Island to intercept Japanese shipping which American intelligence had learned would attempt to evacuate aviation personnel from the Buka-Bonis airfields. Early the next morning, the "Little Beavers" were patrolling the Buka-Rabaul route. At 01:42, in St. George Channel, Spence made surface radar contacts at 22,000 yards (20,000 m). The range closed rapidly, and, at 01:56, DesDiv 45 fired torpedoes at two Japanese ships and scored several hits. Several minutes later, American radar picked up a second group of three enemy ships. Spence and USS Converse were ordered to finish off the first group while DesDiv 45 bombarded the second group.

In the first group, Onami exploded and sank immediately while Makinami was badly damaged. Spence and Converse opened on her with their main batteries and she sank at 02:53. In the second group, DesDiv 45 sank Yugiri. Three of five Japanese destroyers were sunk with no damage to DesRon 23. The squadron returned to Purvis Bay on 31 October.

=== 1944 ===
Spence operated out of Purvis Bay until late January 1944 when she patrolled near Green Island and Bougainville Strait. On 5 February, she participated in the bombardment of supply and bivouac areas at Hahela Plantation on the southeast coast of Buka Island. The next day, she sank an enemy barge with shellfire near Green Island. On the night of 9 and 10 February, Spence helped to shell Tiaraka and Teopasino, Bougainville, Kavieng and Cape St. George, New Ireland. On the 18th, she made a sweep of shipping lanes between Kavieng and Truk. The American warships encountered no ships so they returned to Kavieng and shelled it again on the 22nd. On that day, Spence and DesDiv 45 sank a Japanese merchantman of about 5,000 tons with shellfire.

Spence operated with TF 39 from 1 to 24 March to support the landings on Emirau Island. On the 27th she sortied from Purvis Bay with TF 58 for strikes against Palau, Yap, Ulithi and Woleai, Caroline Islands. From 13 to 25 April, Spence screened the fast carriers as they struck targets on New Guinea in support of the Landing at Aitape, Tanahmerah Bay, and at Humboldt Bay, New Guinea. On the 29th and 30th, the carriers struck enemy shipping and installations at Truk, the powerful Japanese naval base in the Caroline Islands. The destroyer returned to Majuro for a period of upkeep from 4 May to 5 June.

Spence sortied with TG 58.4, the fast carriers, on 6 June, to attack the Mariana Islands. As aircraft struck the islands, the destroyer moved in and bombarded Japanese positions on Guam and Saipan. The planes attacked Iwo Jima on the 16th and then returned to shell the Marianas. Spence participated in the "Marianas Turkey Shoot" during the Battle of the Philippine Sea on 19 and 20 June. On 23 and 24 June, aircraft bombed targets on Guam, Saipan and Tinian. The destroyer conducted shore bombardment against Rota, Saipan and Guam from 26 June through the end of the month setting fuel tanks afire and sinking two sampans on the 27th. Spence replenished at Eniwetok in July and, on 4 August, sailed for the California coast via Pearl Harbor and arrived at San Francisco on 18 August. She was drydocked all of September and, on 5 October, sailed for Pearl Harbor and the Marshalls. She arrived at Eniwetok on 31 October and was ordered to Ulithi in early November, where she was assigned to TG 38.1, the Support Unit for the fast carriers of TF 38. She screened the carriers in Philippine waters as they launched attacks against Luzon during November and the first part of December.

=== Loss ===
On 17 December, Spence prepared to refuel and pumped out all of the salt water ballast from her tanks; but rough seas caused the fueling operation to be cancelled. The next day, the weather worsened and the storm turned into a major typhoon. As the ships wallowed in canyon-like troughs of brine, Spence's electrical equipment got wet from great quantities of sea water taken on board. After a 72-degree roll to port, all of the lights went out and the pumps stopped. The rudder jammed; and, after a deep roll to port about 11:00, Spence capsized and sank. Only 24 of her crew survived. USS Hull and USS Monaghan were also sunk in the typhoon. Spence was struck from the Navy list on 19 January 1945.

== Honors ==
Spence received eight battle stars for World War II service.

== See also ==
- Typhoon Cobra
