= Destroyer Squadron 23 =

United States Navy military unit

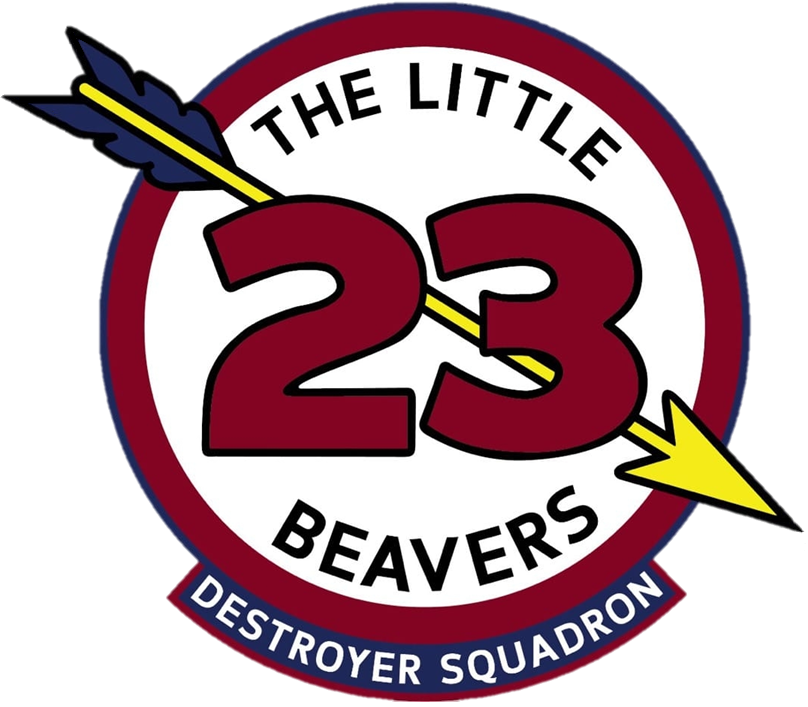
- Founded: 11 May 1943
- Country: United States of America
- Branch: United States Navy
- Type: Destroyer Squadron
- Role: Operational Commander Support
- Part of: Carrier Strike Group Nine
- Garrison/HQ: Naval Base San Diego
- Nickname: "The Little Beavers"
- Website: www.surfpac.navy.mil/cds23/

Commanders
- Commodore: Captain Lawrence Repass
- Deputy Commodore: Captain Ryan Leary
- Command Master Chief: Master Chief Jeanette M. Hafer
- Notable commanders: Arleigh Burke

Destroyer Squadron 23 (DESRON 23) is a squadron of United States Navy destroyers based out of San Diego, California. The squadron is best known for its actions during World War II, most notably the Battle of Cape St. George, under the command of then-Commodore Arleigh Burke. Currently, the DESRON is assigned to Carrier Strike Group Nine, which includes USS Theodore Roosevelt (CVN-71), USS Chosin (CG-65), USS Lake Erie (CG-70), and Carrier Air Wing Eleven.

== Composition ==
The current composition of the squadron includes:

- Squadron Headquarters, at Naval Base San Diego
- USS John S. McCain (DDG-56)
- USS Russell (DDG-59)
- USS Chafee (DDG-90)
- USS Pinckney (DDG-91)
- USS Halsey (DDG-97)
- USS Daniel Inouye (DDG-118)

== History ==
Destroyer Squadron 23 was activated 11 May 1943, at the Boston Navy Yard, with Captain M.J. Gillan II in command. The original vessels of the squadron were USS Foote (DD-511), USS Charles Ausburne (DD-570), USS Spence (DD-512), USS Aulick (DD-569), USS Claxton (DD-571), USS Dyson (DD-572), USS Converse (DD-509) and USS Thatcher (DD-514).

On 29 June 1943, Destroyer Squadron 23 became part of Admiral William F. Halsey's Third Fleet. Less USS Aulick, Destroyer Squadron 23 assumed duty on patrol and escort in the Southwest Pacific.

Destroyer Squadron 23 earned its reputation—and a Presidential Unit Citation—under its second commodore, Captain Arleigh Burke, who assumed command on 23 October 1943. On 24 November 1943, during the Battle of Cape St. George, the squadron engaged two enemy destroyers and three destroyer transports. In what has been described by tacticians as "near perfect surface actions", the squadron sank three enemy destroyers, and damaged one, without damage to themselves. In the period November 1943 – February 1944, the Little Beavers fought in 22 separate engagements and were credited with destroying one Japanese cruiser, nine destroyers, one submarine, several smaller ships, and approximately 30 aircraft.

Destroyer Squadron 23's operations in the Pacific continued through the Liberation of the Philippines. The squadron returned to the United States on 19 October 1945, and were presented the Presidential Unit Citation by Admiral Burke and Secretary of the Navy James Forrestal.

In February 1946, the squadron was inactivated and the ships were sent to Charleston, South Carolina for lay-up.

On 4 April 1956, the squadron was reactivated as Destroyer Division 231 under the command of Captain E. K. Wakefield, with USS Picking (DD-685), USS Stephen Potter (DD-538), USS Preston (DD-795), and USS Irwin (DD-794). The squadron was rededicated as the "Little Beavers" on 12 December 1956, by Rear Admiral Chester Wood, Commander Cruiser Destroyer Force, U.S. Pacific Fleet in ceremonies at Long Beach, California.

USS McClusky (FFG-41) was part of the squadron in 1986. USS Vandegrift (FFG-48) was part of the squadron until her decommissioning in 2015.

It is part of Carrier Strike Group Nine.

== Mascot ==
The mascot of Destroyer Squadron 23 was Little Beaver, a character made famous by Fred Harman's Red Ryder cartoon strip. This cartoon was very popular during the squadron's operations in World War II.

Due to the high tempo of operations during the squadron's operations in the South Pacific, the ships' crews often said they were busy as beavers. This sentiment led to an illustrated painting by a crewman named James Bowler on the side of one of USS Claxton's torpedo tubes. The painting depicted Little Beaver shooting an arrow at Japan's Prime Minister Tōjō.

During an inspection of USS Claxton, then-Commodore Arleigh Burke observed the painting. He liked it so much that he adopted the logo (minus Tojo) for use by the entire squadron and it remained in use until 2021.

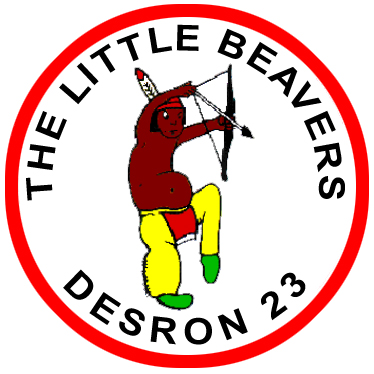
Old emblem of Destroyer Squadron 23

Shortly after receiving complaints of the racist caricature remaining in use, submissions were accepted for a new logo.

On January 1, 2021, the official Facebook changed its profile to the new logo. Now displaying a large "23", with an arrow crossing behind, and "The Little Beavers" enclosed by a circle, with "Destroyer Squadron" below.

Soon after, ships within the DESRON, along with the Headquarters began shifting to new logo.

== Commodores ==
Commodores of the Little Beavers over the years:

- M. J. Gillan II (May 1943 – October 1943)
- Arleigh A. Burke, (October 1943 – March 1944), later Chief of Naval Operations
- T. B. Duncan (March 1944 – July 1945)
- W. C. Ford (August 1945 – February 1946)
- Decommissioned (February 1946 – April 1956)
- E. K. Wakefield (April 1956 – April 1957)
- Harry D. Sturr, World War II submarine commander (April 1957 – April 1958)
- J. E. Smith (April 1958 – May 1959)
- T. H. Morton (May 1959 – February 1960)
- T. D. Cunningham (February 1960 – July 1960)
- J. L. Kelly, Jr. (July 1960 – June 1961)
- F. E. McIntire (June 1961 – September 1962)
- Robert A. Schelling (September 1962 – July 1963)
- C. R. Dwyer (July 1963 – December 1964)
- J. C. Hill (December 1964 – November 1965)
- L. E. Davis, Jr. (November 1965 – July 1967)
- R. E. Spreen (July 1967 – July 1968) (Later Chief of Naval Ordinance and rank of Rear Admiral)
- J. J. Doak (July 1968 – January 1970)
- W. H. Rogers (January 1970 – May 1971)
- G. M. Neely (May 1971 – February 1973)
- Conolly (February 1973 – June 1974)
- Donald P. Roane (June 1974 – October 1976)
- Stuart D. Landersman (October 1976 – November 1978)
- M. L. Treiber (November 1978 – March 1981)
- G. C. Flynn (March 1981 – April 1983)
- W. H. Kersting (April 1983 – June 1985)
- T. A. Barthold (June 1985 – May 1987)
- William E. Kelley (May 1987 – March 1989)
- W. R. Schmidt (March 1989 – March 1991)
- R. L. Miller (March 1991 – December 1992)
- Thomas E. Utegaard (December 1992 – July 1994)
- K. P. Green (July 1994 – July 1995)
- Barry M. Costello (July 1995 – February 1997)
- P. M. Garrett (February 1997 – July 1998)
- C. W. Patten (July 1998 – July 2000)
- R. S. Riche (July 2000 – July 2002)
- Charles W. Martoglio (July 2002 – September 2003)
- Gordan E. Van Hook, Bronze Star recipient for his actions on USS Samuel B. Roberts (FFG-58) (September 2003 – July 2005)
- Michael E. Smith (July 2005 – November 2006)
- Adam S. Levitt (November 2006 – May 2008)
- Troy A. Stoner (May 2008 – July 2009)
- James L. Autrey (July 2009 – December 2010)
- Jesse Wilson (December 2010 – May 2012)
- William J. Parker III (May 2012 − April 2013)
- H. Thomas Workman (April 2013 – August 2014)
- Paul H. Hogue, Jr.(August 2014 – February 2016)
- Tom Williams (February 2016 – March 2017)
- William Rockwell Daly (March 2017 – July 2018)
- David E. Fowler (July 2018 - October 2019)
- Jeffrey Heames (October 2019 – November 2020)
- Steven McDowell (November 2020—March 2022)
- P.H. O'Mahoney (March 2022—present)
