= Saint George's Channel (Papua New Guinea) =

Strait in Papua New Guinea

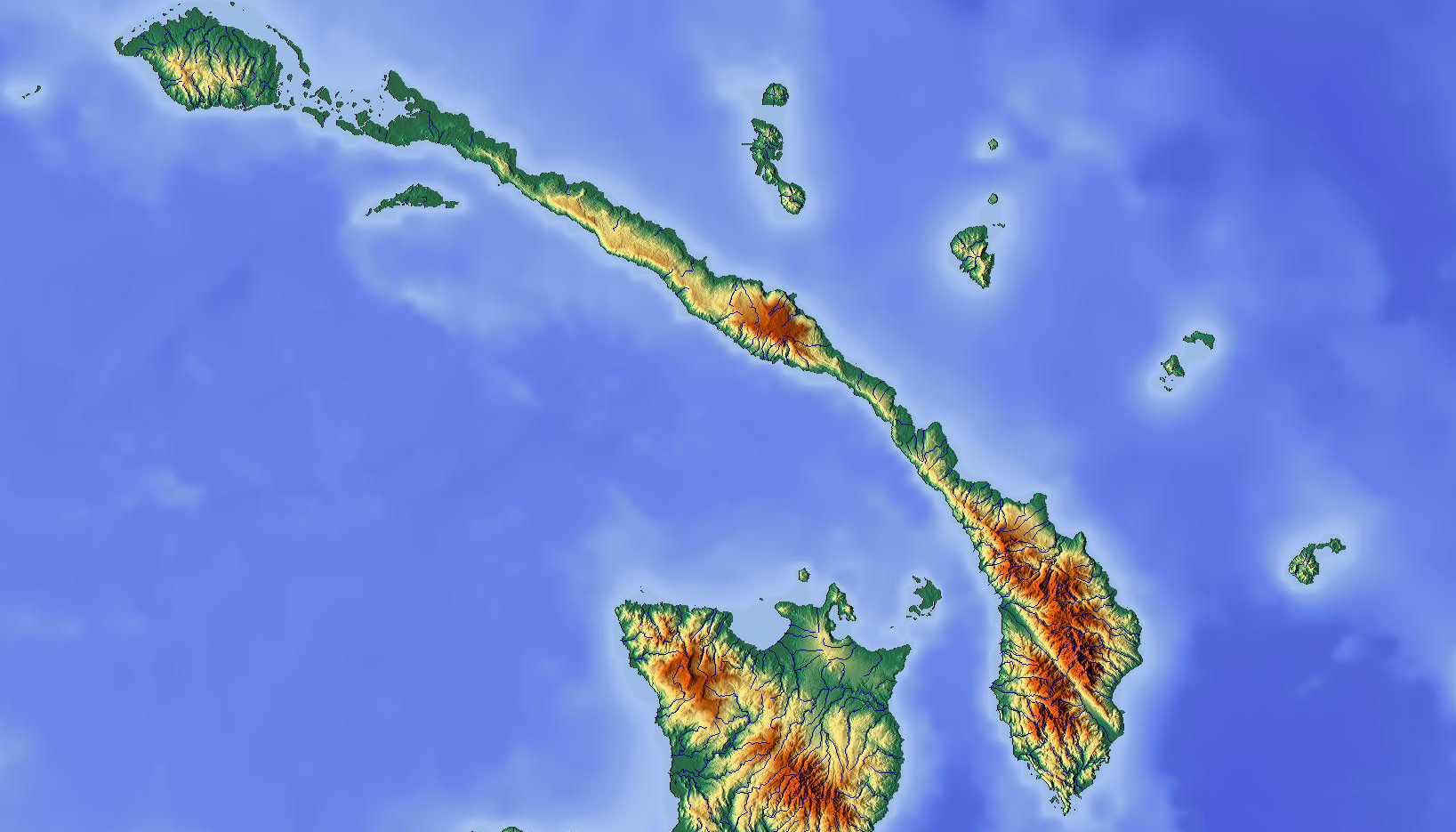
- Location within New Ireland
- Coordinates: 4°31′39″S 152°33′38″E
- Type: strait

Saint George's Channel in the Bismarck Archipelago, lies between New Ireland and New Britain. It is named by analogy with St George's Channel between Great Britain and Ireland.

== History ==
During World War II Saint George's Channel was used by the Imperial Japanese Navy connecting Rabaul to the open sea and for ships bound for the Solomon Islands. Allied missions against Japanese forces at Cape St. George and St. George's Channel were conducted at December 31, 1942 - October 26, 1944.

== See also ==
- Battle of Cape St. George – 1943 naval battle in the Pacific
- Duke of York Islands – Islands in Papua New Guinea
