= USS Charles Ausburn (DD-294) =

Clemson-class destroyer

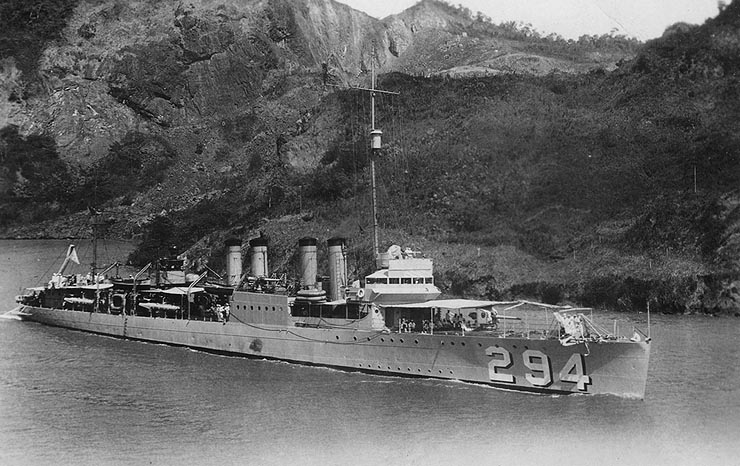
- USS Charles Ausburn (DD-294)

History

United States
- Namesake: Charles Lawrence Ausburne
- Builder: Bethlehem Shipbuilding Corporation, Squantum Victory Yard
- Cost: $1,217,839 (hull and machinery)
- Laid down: 11 September 1919
- Launched: 18 December 1919
- Commissioned: 23 March 1920
- Decommissioned: 1 May 1930
- Stricken: 22 October 1930
- Fate: Sold for scrapping, 17 January 1931

General characteristics
- Class & type: Clemson-class destroyer
- Displacement: 1,290 long tons (1,311 t) (standard); 1,389 long tons (1,411 t) (deep load)
- Length: 314 ft 4 in (95.8 m)
- Beam: 30 ft 11 in (9.42 m)
- Draught: 10 ft 3 in (3.1 m)
- Installed power: 27,000 shp (20,000 kW); 4 water-tube boilers
- Propulsion: 2 shafts, 2 steam turbines
- Speed: 35 knots (65 km/h; 40 mph) (design)
- Range: 2,500 nautical miles (4,600 km; 2,900 mi) at 20 knots (37 km/h; 23 mph) (design)
- Complement: 6 officers, 108 enlisted men
- Armament: 4 × single 4-inch (102 mm) guns; 2 × single 1-pounder AA guns or; 2 × single 3-inch (76 mm) guns; 4 × triple 21 inch (533 mm) torpedo tubes; 2 × depth charge rails

USS Charles Ausburn (DD-294) was a Clemson-class destroyer built for the United States Navy subsequent to World War I.

== Construction and career ==
Charles Ausburn, named for Charles Lawrence Ausburne, was launched 18 December 1919 by Bethlehem Shipbuilding Corporation, Squantum, Massachusetts; sponsored by Mrs. D. K. Ausburn; and commissioned 23 March 1920. Assigned to the Atlantic Fleet, Charles Ausburn operated from Charleston, South Carolina, Norfolk, Virginia and Newport, Rhode Island along the Atlantic coast and in the Caribbean through 1924, serving with a reduced complement from October 1920 to May 1922. During those years, as she participated in fleet exercises and training maneuvers, she aided in the development and application of new ideas in naval warfare. In the fall of 1923, Charles Ausburn was equipped to carry a seaplane, with which she performed experiments in the rapidly developing field of naval aviation.

In late summer of 1924, Charles Ausburn cruised to northern latitudes to provide plane guard service in the round-the-world flight of Army aircraft, maintaining stations off Greenland and Newfoundland. On 18 June 1925, she sailed from Boston for a year of duty off Europe and in the Mediterranean, visiting at a large number of ports before her return to New York 11 July 1926. She continued her operations with the fleet, often providing facilities for the training of reservists, until 1 May 1930, when she was decommissioned at Philadelphia. There she was sold 17 January 1931.
