= Charles Ausburne =

Charles Lawrence Ausburne
- Born: July 26, 1889; New Orleans, Louisiana
- Died: October 17, 1917 (aged 28)
- Burial place: at sea
- Military career
- Allegiance: United States of America
- Branch: United States Navy
- Rank: Electrician First Class
- Units: Antilles
- Awards: Navy Cross

Charles Lawrence Ausburne (July 26, 1889 – October 17, 1917) enlisted in the United States Navy February 25, 1908.

As an Electrician First Class, Ausburne manned the emergency Wireless station in the Army transport Antilles, and following the ship's fatal torpedoing October 17, 1917 by U-105, stood to his duty until the ship sank beneath him. His gallantry was recognized in the posthumous award of the Navy Cross.

Two ships of the U.S. Navy have been named in his honor. Since other family members spelled their name as Ausburn, the first ship was named USS Charles Ausburn (DD-294). It was later found that he himself spelled his surname as Ausburne, and the second ship was named USS Charles Ausburne (DD-570).
