= Japanese destroyer Makinami (1941) =

Yūgumo-class destroyer

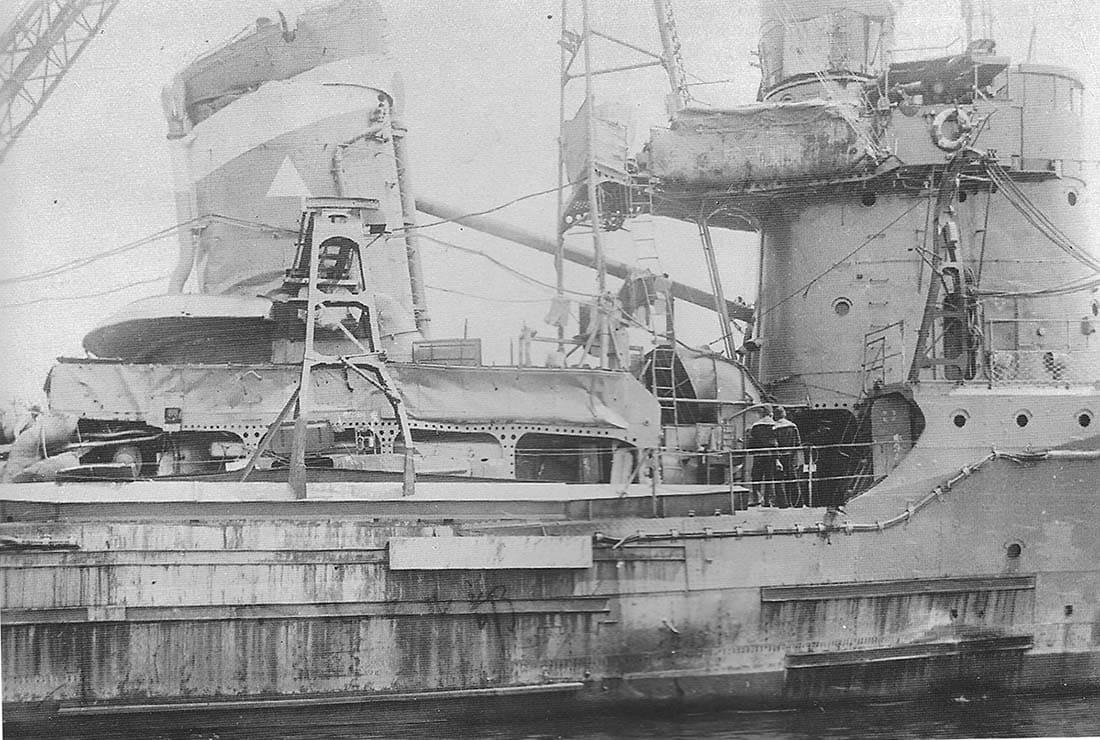
- Makinami's bridge and superstructure photographed while under repairs in Maizuru, April of 1943.

History

Empire of Japan
- Name: Makinami
- Builder: Maizuru Naval Arsenal
- Laid down: 11 April 1941
- Launched: 17 December 1941
- Completed: 18 August 1942
- Stricken: 10 February 1944
- Fate: Sunk in Battle of Cape St. George, 25 November 1943

General characteristics
- Class & type: Yūgumo-class destroyer
- Displacement: 2,520 long tons (2,560 t)
- Length: 119.15 m (390 ft 11 in)
- Beam: 10.8 m (35 ft 5 in)
- Draught: 3.75 m (12 ft 4 in)
- Speed: 35.5 knots (40.9 mph; 65.7 km/h)
- Complement: 228
- Armament: 6 × 127 mm (5.0 in)/50 caliber DP guns; up to 28 × Type 96 25 mm (0.98 in) AA guns; up to 4 × 13.2 mm (0.52 in) AA guns; 8 × 610 mm (24 in) torpedo tubes for Type 93 torpedoes; 36 depth charges

Service record
- Operations: Naval battle of Guadalcanal (1942); Battle of Tassafaronga (1942); Operation Ke (1943); Battle of Cape Saint George (1943)
- Victories: USS Northampton (1930)

Makinami (巻波) was a Yūgumo-class destroyer of the Imperial Japanese Navy. Her name means "Overflowing Waves" (Rolling Wave). The destroyer mostly engaged in troop transport missions throughout her career, with a few notable moments. She escorted a failed troop convoy during the naval battle of Guadalcanal, before engaging a US cruiser-destroyer task force during the battle of Tassafaronga, contributing to the greatest victory of the engagement when she helped to sink the heavy cruiser USS Northampton. She was crippled by bomb near misses during Operation Ke, taking her out of action for several months, before Makinami was finally sunk by American destroyers during the battle of Cape Saint George.

== Design and description ==
The Yūgumo class was a repeat of the preceding Kagerō class with minor improvements that increased their anti-aircraft capabilities. Their crew numbered 228 officers and enlisted men. The ships measured 119.17 meters (391 ft 0 in) overall, with a beam of 10.8 meters (35 ft 5 in) and a draft of 3.76 meters (12 ft 4 in). They displaced 2,110 metric tons (2,080 long tons) at standard load and 2,560 metric tons (2,520 long tons) at deep load. The ships had two Kampon geared steam turbines, each driving one propeller shaft, using steam provided by three Kampon water-tube boilers. The turbines were rated at a total of 52,000 shaft horsepower (39,000 kW) for a designed speed of 35 knots (65 km/h; 40 mph).

The main armament of the Yūgumo class consisted of six Type 3 127-millimeter (5.0 in) guns in three twin-gun turrets, one superfiring pair aft and one turret forward of the superstructure. The guns were able to elevate up to 75° to increase their ability against aircraft, but their slow rate of fire, slow traversing speed, and the lack of any sort of high-angle fire-control system meant that they were virtually useless as anti-aircraft guns. They were built with four Type 96 25-millimeter (1.0 in) anti-aircraft guns in two twin-gun mounts, but more of these guns were added over the course of the war. The ships were also armed with eight 610-millimeter (24.0 in) torpedo tubes in a two quadruple traversing mounts; one reload was carried for each tube. Their anti-submarine weapons comprised two depth charge throwers for which 36 depth charges were carried.

== Construction and career ==
Makinami was completed on August 18 1942, and was assigned to operate with the destroyer Naganami. From September 6-10, Makinami escorted the battleships Kongō and Haruna from Kure to Truk, then spent the rest of the month patrolling around Truk. On October 13-14, she escorted Kongō and Haruna during their bombardment of Henderson Field, then did the same for the heavy cruisers Myōkō and Maya two days later. On the 26th, Makinami served as a carrier escort during the battle of Santa Cruz, then on November 3-5 escorted the heavy cruisers Maya and Suzuya to the Shortlands. From November 7-10, she departed on two troop transport runs to Guadalcanal, then escorted Japanese troop ships during the naval battle of Guadalcanal. Enroute, seven on the transport ships were sunk, prompting Makinami to rescue 1,020 survivors from the Arizona Maru. Makinami followed up by escorting a large convoy to the Shortland on the 24th.

=== Battle of Tassafaronga ===
Main Article: Battle of Tassafaronga

On 30 November, Makinami was one of eight Japanese destroyers tasked with a supply drum mission, and while in the middle of dropping off supplies, an American cruiser force intercepted them and opened fire. As the battle continued, the Kagerō - the destroyer ahead of Makinami - lost track of the main formation and sailed away, and Makinami followed her, leaving them unable to take part in the main torpedo spreads fired by Takanami, Oyashio, Kuroshio, Kawakaze, and Naganami; Takanami was sunk while the heavy cruisers USS Minneapolis, New Orleans, and Pensacola were crippled by torpedo hits and the light cruiser USS Honolulu was forced to turn away to dodge torpedo spreads.

However, the heavy cruiser USS Northampton turned northwest and continued on alone to engage the Japanese destroyers. This put her right in Makinami's and Kagerō's crosshairs, which had also turned northwest and still had their torpedoes loaded. They noticed the enemy ship and dumped their remaining long lances to the port side at the sole remaining US cruiser, and scored the greatest victory of the battle. Two of their torpedoes gouged into Northampton next to each other on the port side of the ship's rear half, one hitting and destroying engine room, and the other hitting right behind her turret 3. The damage detonated her fuel takes, flooded three of her four propellers and left the cruiser dead in the water, and started a gigantic fire inside the ship. Northampton immediately listed at 10 degrees, and as flooding and fires quickly overwhelmed damage control until the abandon ship order with issued. Over a period of 3 hours, Northampton sank by the stern, taking 50 men with her.

Makinami engaged in more supply drum missions throughout December, then did the same throughout January of 1943. On February 1, Makinami took part in the evacuation of Guadalcanal, where she was crippled by bomb near misses that left her dead in the water. She was towed to Truk, and after emergency repairs limped to Maizuru, where she remained docked until September 15.

Upon repairs being complete, Makinami departed for Shanghai, and from September 24 to October 5, she escorted a large troop convoy to Rabaul, and then back to Truk on October 9. From October 17-26, Makinami escorted combined fleet in an attempt to counterattack American aircraft carrier raids, but this did not yield action as the force returned to Truk. On November 6, she covered a troop transport run to Bougainville, then after US carrier raids off Rabaul, she towed the crippled Naganami to port to be repaired. On the 19th, Makinami took part in a troop transport run to Garove Island, then three days later covered a troop transport run to Buka.

=== Battle of Cape Saint George ===
Main Article: Battle of Cape Saint George

On the night of 24–25 November 1943, Makinami was on a troop evacuation run to Buka Island, but they were not alone. Captain Arleigh Bruke - fresh off of his role at the battle of the Empress Augusta Bay where his ships sank the destroyer Hatsukaze - had detected Makinami and her consort, the destroyer Ōnami with radar. His flagship, the destroyer USS Charles Ausburne, leading the destroyers USS Claxton and USS Dyson increased speed in an attempt to take advantage of poor weather and ambushed the pair. Closing to firing range undetected, the three ships launched their torpedoes. Multiple hit Ōnami, which broke apart and sank instantly with all hands. One torpedo hit Makinami, disabling all electrical power and leaving her dead in the water with a 20-degree list to port. Burke's destroyers charged on and attacked other targets (with Charles Ausburne successfully sinking the destroyer Yūgiri) while the crippled Makinami was left to await her fate, which came when two more destroyers, USS Spence and USS Converse, joined the battle. Resulting gunfire damage quickly delivered the final blow and Makinami rapidly sank. Most of her crew died aboard the ship, but 29 men did manage to escape on a lifeboat and reach shore.
