= Battle of Cape St. George =

1943 naval battle in the Pacific

- Part of the Bougainville Campaign of the Pacific Theater (World War II)
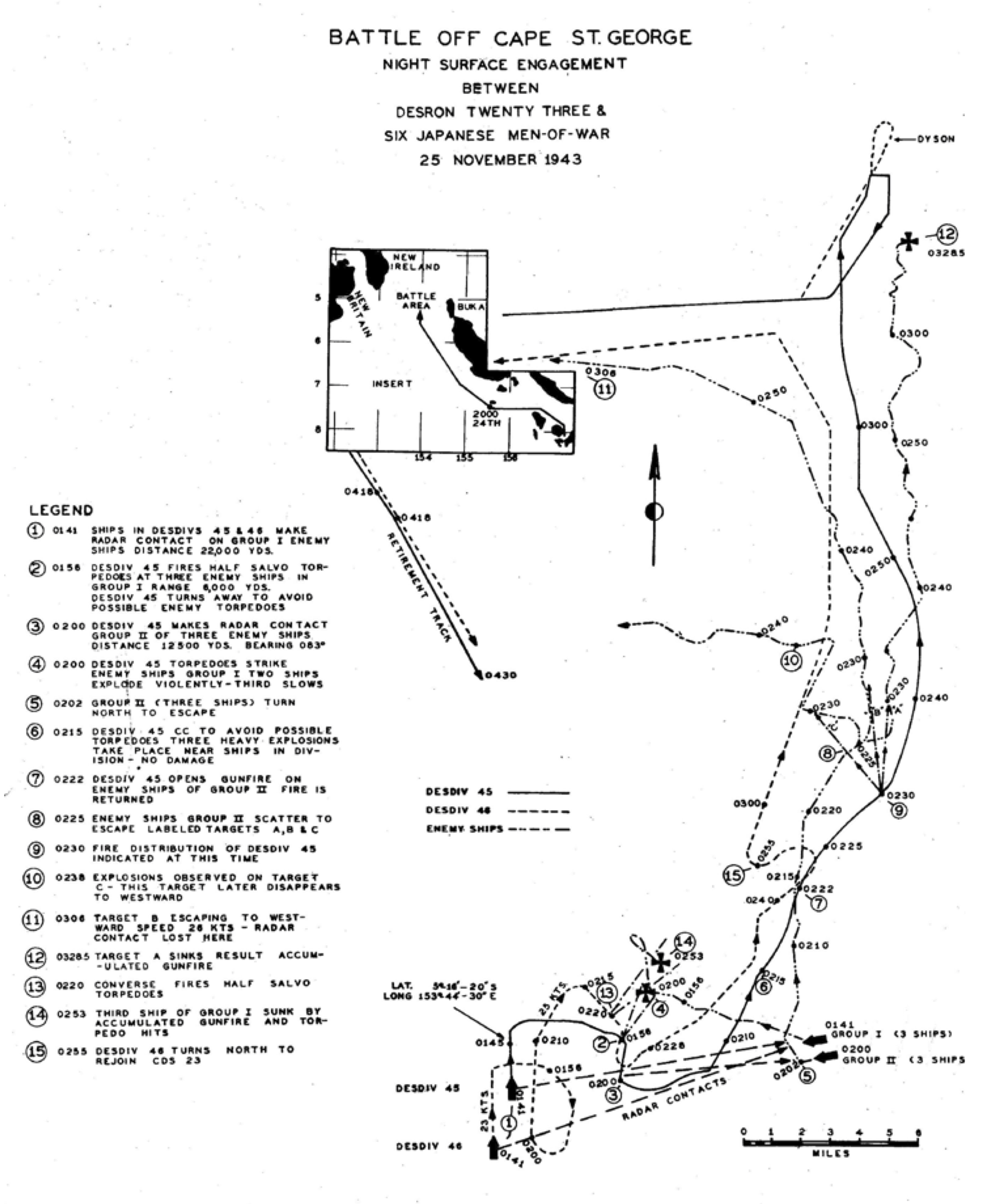
- Track chart of the battle
Date	25 November 1943
Location	Near Buka Island, north of Bougainville
Result	American victory

Belligerents
United States	Japan

Commanders and leaders
Arleigh Burke	Kiyoto Kagawa †

Units involved
Destroyer Squadron 23	Destroyer Division 31

Strength
5 destroyers	5 destroyer transports

Casualties and losses
None	3 destroyers sunk, 1 destroyer damaged, 647 killed (Note: Nevitt says all hands (228 men) were lost on Onami and all but 28 were lost on Makinami (total lost 200 men), and, along with Morison, says that there were 278 survivors from Yugiri. Morison says there were 300 troops on Yugiri, which along with a normal complement of 197 means about 497 were on board during this engagement. Subtracting 278 from 497 equals 219 killed on Yugiri.)

The Battle of Cape St. George was a naval battle of the Pacific campaign of World War II fought on 25 November 1943, between Cape St. George, New Ireland, and Buka Island (now part of the North Solomons Province in Papua New Guinea). It was the last engagement of surface ships in the Solomon Islands campaign. During the engagement, a force of five US Navy destroyers led by Captain Arleigh Burke intercepted a similar sized Japanese force that was withdrawing from Buka towards Rabaul, having landed reinforcements on the island. In the ensuing fight, three Japanese destroyers were sunk and one was damaged, with no losses amongst the US forces.

== Background ==
The Americans had landed Marines from the 3rd Marine Division around Cape Torokina on Bougainville Island on 1 November 1943. Judging the landings a ruse, and that the real Allied objective was the airfields around Buka Island to the north of Bougainville, the Japanese delayed launching a concerted counterattack on Cape Torokina, and instead determined to reinforce Buka. As a result, 920 Japanese Army troops were embarked on the destroyers Amagiri, Yūgiri and Uzuki under the command of Captain Katsumori Yamashiro and were sent to reinforce the garrison, escorted by the destroyers Ōnami and Makinami under the command of Captain Kiyoto Kagawa. The convoy was spotted by reconnaissance aircraft, and the United States Navy sent Captain Arleigh Burke's Destroyer Squadron 23, composed of Destroyer Division 45 (Charles Ausburne, Claxton, and Dyson), under Burke's direct command, and Destroyer Division 46 (Converse and Spence), under Commander Bernard Austin to intercept it. Meanwhile, nine PT boats under Commander Henry Farrow moved into the Buka Passage to engage the Japanese if Burke's force was unable to make contact.

== Battle ==
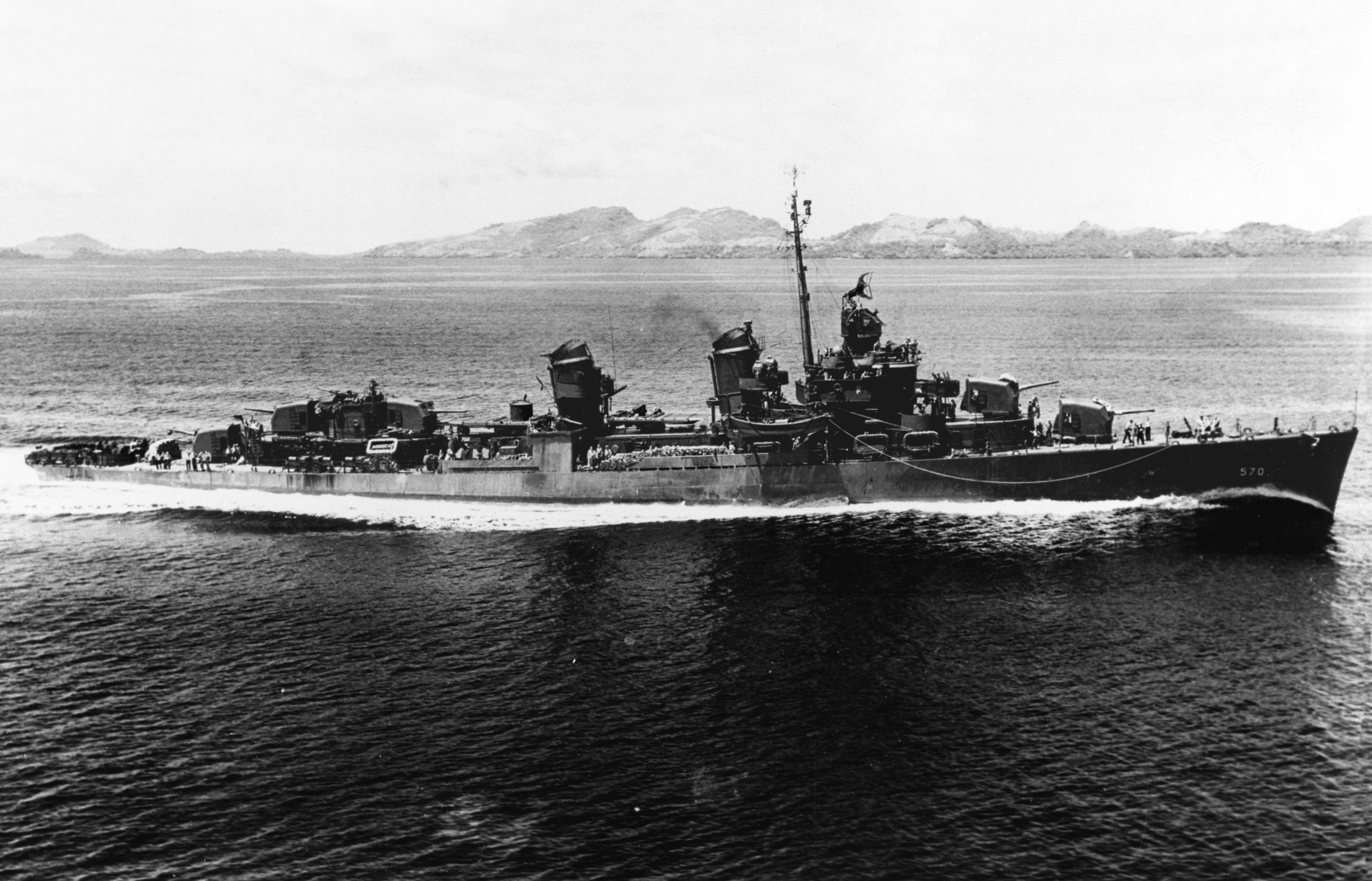
U.S. destroyer Charles Ausburne operating in the Solomon Islands around 1943.

The Japanese battle plan divided their force into two columns, with the three transport destroyers trailing the two escort destroyers. The American battle plan also divided their force into two columns using tactics devised by Burke and first employed successfully by Commander Frederick Moosbrugger at the Battle of Vella Gulf the previous August. One column would make a torpedo attack while the other took up a supporting position ready to open gunfire as soon as the first column's torpedo attack struck home.

The Japanese destroyers landed the 920 troops and supplies and embarked 700 Navy aviation personnel being withdrawn because Allied bombing had rendered the airfield at Buka non-operational. The Japanese force was returning to Rabaul when Farrow's PT boats spotted four of the Japanese ships on their radar on 25 November 1943 just after midnight; however, the PT boats mistook the Japanese vessels for friendly forces and moved closer to shore. Two of the Japanese ships subsequently attacked the PT boats, firing on them and attempting to ram PT-318. They failed to score any hits, though, while one of the PT boats, PT-64, fired a torpedo which missed its target. Afterwards, the Japanese destroyers steamed west towards Cape St. George.

Around 01:41, Kagawa's two screening destroyers were picked up by radar by Burke's destroyers, which had moved into position between Cape St. George and Buka, with Dyson making contact first. Poor visibility prevented the Japanese from spotting the American ships in turn. Burke elected to use his own division for the torpedo attack. Superior radar allowed the American ships to approach within 5,500 yards (5,000 m) and launch their torpedoes at about 01:55 before the Japanese sighted them. Onami was hit by several torpedoes and sank immediately with all hands, including Kagawa. Makinami was hit by one torpedo and disabled.

Burke's force established radar contact with the rest of the Japanese force at 13,000 yards (12,000 m) soon after launching their torpedoes and turned to pursue; Yamashiro's three transport destroyers fled north, pursued by Burke's division, while Converse and Spence from Austin's division finished off the disabled Makinami with torpedoes and gunfire. During the chase, torpedoes fired by Japanese destroyers exploded in the wakes of the American destroyers. Burke's three destroyers steadily gained on the three heavily laden Japanese destroyers, opening fire around 02:22, scoring several hits. Uzuki was hit by one dud shell and escaped without significant damage. Amagiri escaped untouched. Around 02:25, the Japanese ships split up and fled in different directions. Burke chose to pursue Yugiri with his entire force and sank her at about 03:28 after a fierce engagement.

== Aftermath ==
By 03:45, Burke’s and Austin's divisions had linked up, continuing to push north to pursue the withdrawing Japanese ships. Burke subsequently called off the attempt at 04:04, low on fuel and ammunition and needing to withdraw before daylight, when Japanese aircraft would likely begin operations to search for them. In the event, the only aircraft the US ships spotted once daylight came were friendly AirSols P-38 Lightnings.

The battle represented a significant victory for the Americans and was later described as an "almost perfect action," for which Burke was awarded a Navy Cross. It was the final surface engagement of the Solomon Islands campaign and the last such action in the wider Pacific for nine months. Although the Japanese were able to land their troops and withdraw their supporting personnel, they lost three destroyers sunk and one damaged, without inflicting any losses on the American force. Amongst the Japanese crews, a total of 647 were killed. A total of 279 survivors from Yugiri were rescued by the Japanese submarine I-177 and 11 by the Japanese submarine I-181.

== Namesake ==
The U.S. Navy Ticonderoga-class guided-missile cruiser USS Cape St. George (CG-71), in commission since 1993, was named for this battle.

== Notes ==
Footnotes

Citations
