= Japanese destroyer Ōnami (1942) =

Yūgumo-class destroyer

- Right elevation and plan of a Yūgumo-class destroyer

History

Empire of Japan
- Name: Ōnami
- Builder: Fujinagata Shipbuilding Yard
- Laid down: 15 November 1941
- Launched: 31 August 1942
- Completed: 29 December 1942
- Commissioned: 20 January 1943, 31st Destroyer Division
- Stricken: 10 February 1944
- Fate: Sunk in action, 25 November 1943

General characteristics
- Class & type: Yūgumo-class destroyer
- Displacement: 2,077 long tons (2,110 t) standard; 2,520 long tons (2,560 t) battle condition
- Length: 119.15 m (390 ft 11 in)
- Beam: 10.8 m (35 ft 5 in)
- Draught: 3.75 m (12 ft 4 in)
- Speed: 35 knots (40 mph; 65 km/h)
- Complement: 228
- Armament: 6 × 127 mm (5.0 in)/50 caliber DP guns; 8 × Type 96 Type 96 25 mm (0.98 in) AA guns; 2 × Type 92 (IV) 610 mm (24 in) torpedo tubes; 16 × Type 93 torpedoes; 18 depth charges

Ōnami (大波) was a Yūgumo-class destroyer of the Imperial Japanese Navy during World War II. Her name means "Billow Wave" (Big Rough Waves).

== Design and description ==
The Yūgumo class was a repeat of the preceding Kagerō class with minor improvements that increased their anti-aircraft capabilities. Their crew numbered 228 officers and enlisted men. The ships measured 119.17 meters (391 ft 0 in) overall, with a beam of 10.8 meters (35 ft 5 in) and a draft of 3.76 meters (12 ft 4 in). They displaced 2,110 metric tons (2,080 long tons) at standard load and 2,560 metric tons (2,520 long tons) at deep load. The ships had two Kampon geared steam turbines, each driving one propeller shaft, using steam provided by three Kampon water-tube boilers. The turbines were rated at a total of 52,000 shaft horsepower (39,000 kW) for a designed speed of 35 knots (65 km/h; 40 mph).

The main armament of the Yūgumo class consisted of six Type 3 127-millimeter (5.0 in) guns in three twin-gun turrets, one superfiring pair aft and one turret forward of the superstructure. The guns were able to elevate up to 75° to increase their ability against aircraft, but their slow rate of fire, slow traversing speed, and the lack of any sort of high-angle fire-control system meant that they were virtually useless as anti-aircraft guns. They were built with four Type 96 25-millimeter (1.0 in) anti-aircraft guns in two twin-gun mounts, but more of these guns were added over the course of the war. The ships were also armed with eight 610-millimeter (24.0 in) torpedo tubes in a two quadruple traversing mounts; one reload was carried for each tube. Their anti-submarine weapons comprised two depth charge throwers for which 36 depth charges were carried.

== Construction and career ==
On the night of 24–25 November 1943, Ōnami led a troop transport/evacuation run to Buka Island. In the Battle of Cape St. George, she was torpedoed by the destroyers USS Charles Ausburne, Claxton and/or Dyson, 55 miles (89 km) east-southeast of Cape St. George (05°15′S 153°49′E). Ōnami blew up and sank with all hands, including ComDesDiv 31 (Captain Kiyoto Kagawa). Onami's Commanding Officer, Commander Kiyoshi Kikkawa, was posthumously promoted two ranks, one of the few IJN destroyer skippers so honored.
