= Japanese destroyer Yūgiri (1930) =

Fubuki-class destroyer

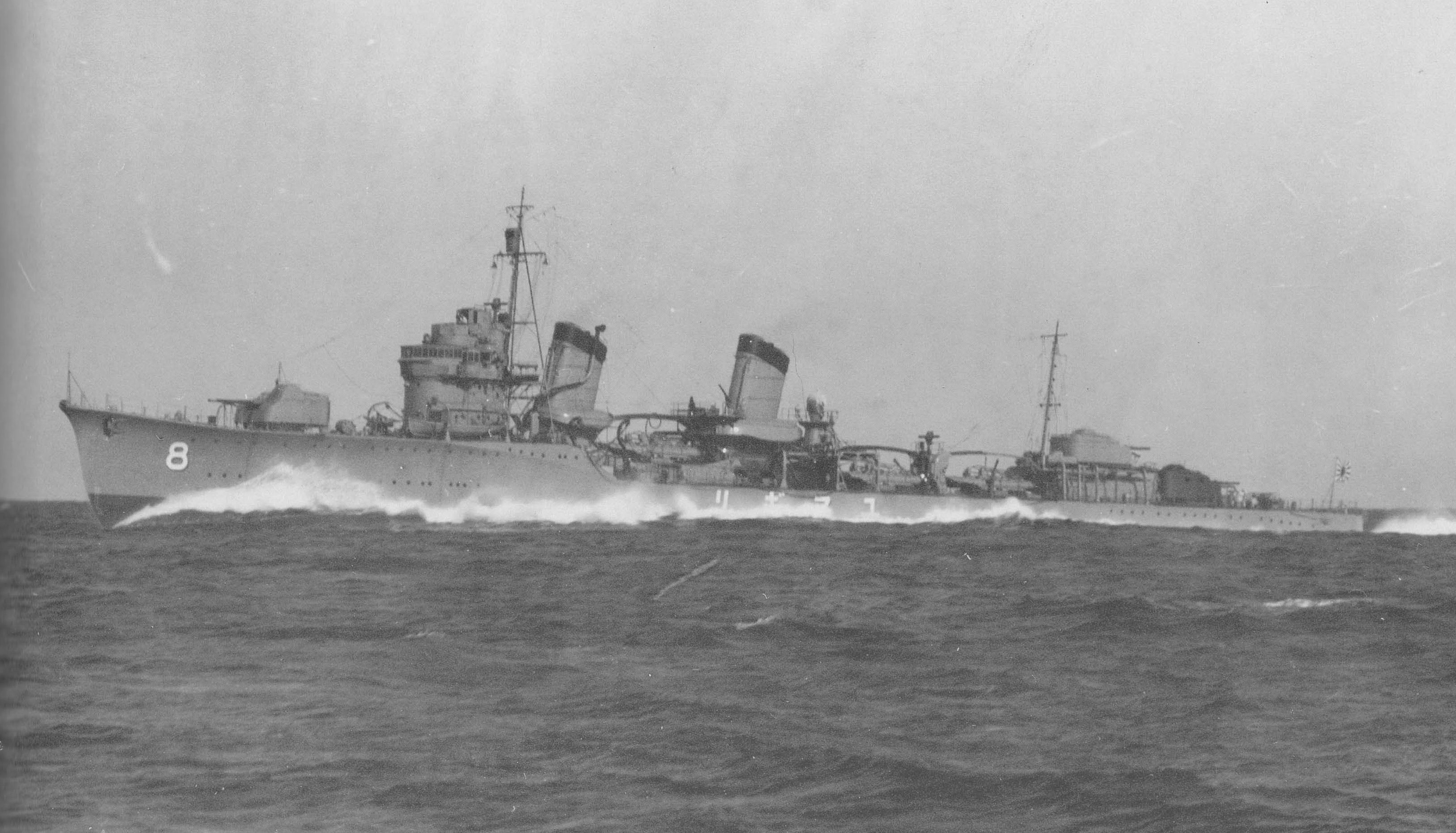
- Yūgiri underway on 29 November 1930.

History

Empire of Japan
- Name: Yūgiri
- Namesake: Japanese destroyer Yūgiri (1899)
- Ordered: 1923 Fiscal Year
- Builder: Maizuru Naval Arsenal
- Yard number: Destroyer No. 48
- Laid down: 1 April 1929
- Launched: 12 May 1930
- Commissioned: 3 December 1930
- Stricken: 12 December 1943
- Fate: Sunk 25 November 1943

General characteristics
- Class & type: Fubuki-class destroyer
- Displacement: 1,750 long tons (1,780 t) standard; 2,050 long tons (2,080 t) re-built
- Length: 111.96 m (367.3 ft) pp; 115.3 m (378 ft) waterline; 118.41 m (388.5 ft) overall
- Beam: 10.4 m (34 ft 1 in)
- Draft: 3.2 m (10 ft 6 in)
- Propulsion: 4 × Kampon type boilers; 2 × Kampon Type Ro geared turbines; 2 × shafts at 50,000 ihp (37,000 kW)
- Speed: 38 knots (44 mph; 70 km/h)
- Range: 5,000 nmi (9,300 km) at 14 knots (26 km/h)
- Complement: 219
- Armament: 6 × Type 3 127 mm 50 caliber naval guns (3×2); up to 22 × Type 96 25 mm AT/AA Guns; up to 10 × 13 mm AA guns; 9 × 610 mm (24 in) torpedo tubes; 36 × depth charges

Service record
- Operations: Second Sino-Japanese War; Battle of Malaya; Battle of Midway; Indian Ocean raid; Solomon Islands campaign; Battle of Cape St. George

Yūgiri (夕霧, "Evening Mist") was the fourteenth of twenty-four Fubuki-class destroyers, built for the Imperial Japanese Navy following World War I.

== History ==
Construction of the advanced Fubuki-class destroyers was authorized as part of the Imperial Japanese Navy's expansion program from fiscal 1923, intended to give Japan a qualitative edge with the world's most modern ships. The Fubuki class had performance that was a quantum leap over previous destroyer designs, so much so that they were designated Special Type destroyers (特型, Tokugata). The large size, powerful engines, high speed, large radius of action and unprecedented armament gave these destroyers the firepower similar to many light cruisers in other navies. Yūgiri, built at the Maizuru Naval Arsenal was the fourth in an improved series, which incorporated a modified gun turret which could elevate her main battery of Type 3 127 mm 50 caliber naval guns to 75° as opposed to the original 40°, thus permitting the guns to be used as dual purpose guns against aircraft. Yūgiri was laid down on 1 April 1929, launched on 12 May 1930 and commissioned on 3 December 1930. Originally assigned hull designation “Destroyer No. 48”, she was named Yūgiri before her launch.

== Operational history ==
In 1932, after the First Shanghai Incident, Yūgiri was assigned to patrols of the Yangtze River. In 1935, after the Fourth Fleet Incident, in which a large number of ships were damaged by a typhoon and Yūgiri's bow was torn off, Yūgiri, along with her sister ships, were modified with stronger hulls and increased displacement. From 1937, Yūgiri covered landing of Japanese forces in Shanghai and Hangzhou in the Second Sino-Japanese War. From 1940, she was assigned to patrol and cover landings of Japanese forces in south China, and subsequently participated in the Invasion of French Indochina.

=== World War II history ===
At the time of the attack on Pearl Harbor, Yūgiri was assigned to Destroyer Division 20 of Desron 3 of the IJN 1st Fleet, and had deployed from Kure Naval District to the port of Samah on Hainan Island, escorting Japanese troopships for landing operations in the Battle of Malaya.

On 19 December, Yūgiri sank the Dutch submarine HNLMS O 20 with assistance from her sister ships Uranami and Ayanami. On 27 January, Yūgiri and her convoy were attacked by the destroyers HMS Thanet and HMAS Vampire approximately 80 nautical miles (148 km) north of Singapore in the Battle off Endau, and her torpedoes are credited with helping sink Thanet.

Yūgiri subsequently was part of the escort for the heavy cruisers Suzuya, Kumano, Mogami and Mikuma in support of "Operation L", the invasion of Banka, Palembang and the Anambas Islands in the Netherlands East Indies. At the end of February, Yūgiri covered minesweeping operations around Singapore and Johore.

In March, Yūgiri joined "Operation T", the invasion of northern Sumatra, and the "Operation D", the invasion of the Andaman Islands. During the Indian Ocean raids, Yugiri, together with Chōkai and Yura and aircraft carrier Ryūjō is credited with sinking six merchant vessels. From 13 to 22 April Yūgiri returned via Singapore and Camranh Bay to Kure Naval Arsenal, for maintenance.

On 4–5 June, Yūgiri participated in the Battle of Midway as was part of the diversionary Aleutian Invasion force. In July 1942, Yūgiri sailed from Amami-Ōshima to Mako Guard District, Singapore, Sabang and Mergui for a projected second Indian Ocean raid. The operation was cancelled due to the Guadalcanal campaign, and Yūgiri was ordered to Truk instead, arriving in late August. After the Battle of the Eastern Solomons on 24 August, Yūgiri took on troops from transport ships while at sea, and sailed on to Guadalcanal. During this operation, she was struck by a direct hit near her bridge by a bomb from a United States Marine Corps SBD Dauntless dive bomber from Henderson Field, killing 32 crewmen, including the commander of Destroyer Division 20, Captain Yamada Yuji. After emergency repairs at Truk, Yūgiri returned to Kure Naval Arsenal in early October for repairs which took to the end of 1942.

From 25 January 1943, Yūgiri was reassigned to the IJN 8th Fleet. She returned to Rabaul at the end of April and was assigned to numerous "Tokyo Express" transport missions to various locations in the Solomon Islands in May. On 16 May, she was torpedoed by the American submarine USS Grayback northwest of Kavieng, killing nine crewmen, and had to be towed back to Rabaul by Amagiri. She was sent back to Japan for repairs at the end of July. Yūgiri returned to the Solomon Islands in mid November. On 24 November, Yūgiri was one of five destroyers on a troop transport/evacuation run to Buka. In the Battle of Cape St. George on 25 November 1943, she was sunk by gunfire of the destroyers USS Charles Ausburne, USS Claxton and USS Dyson approximately 50 nautical miles (93 km) east of Cape St. George at position 04°44′S 154°0′E. The Japanese submarine I-177 rescued 278 survivors and I-181 rescued 11 more; however, Yūgiri’s captain, Lieutenant Commander Shuichi Otsuji, went down with his ship.

On 15 December 1943, Yūgiri was removed from the navy list.
