= Cape St. George =

Southernmost point of New Ireland, Papua New Guinea

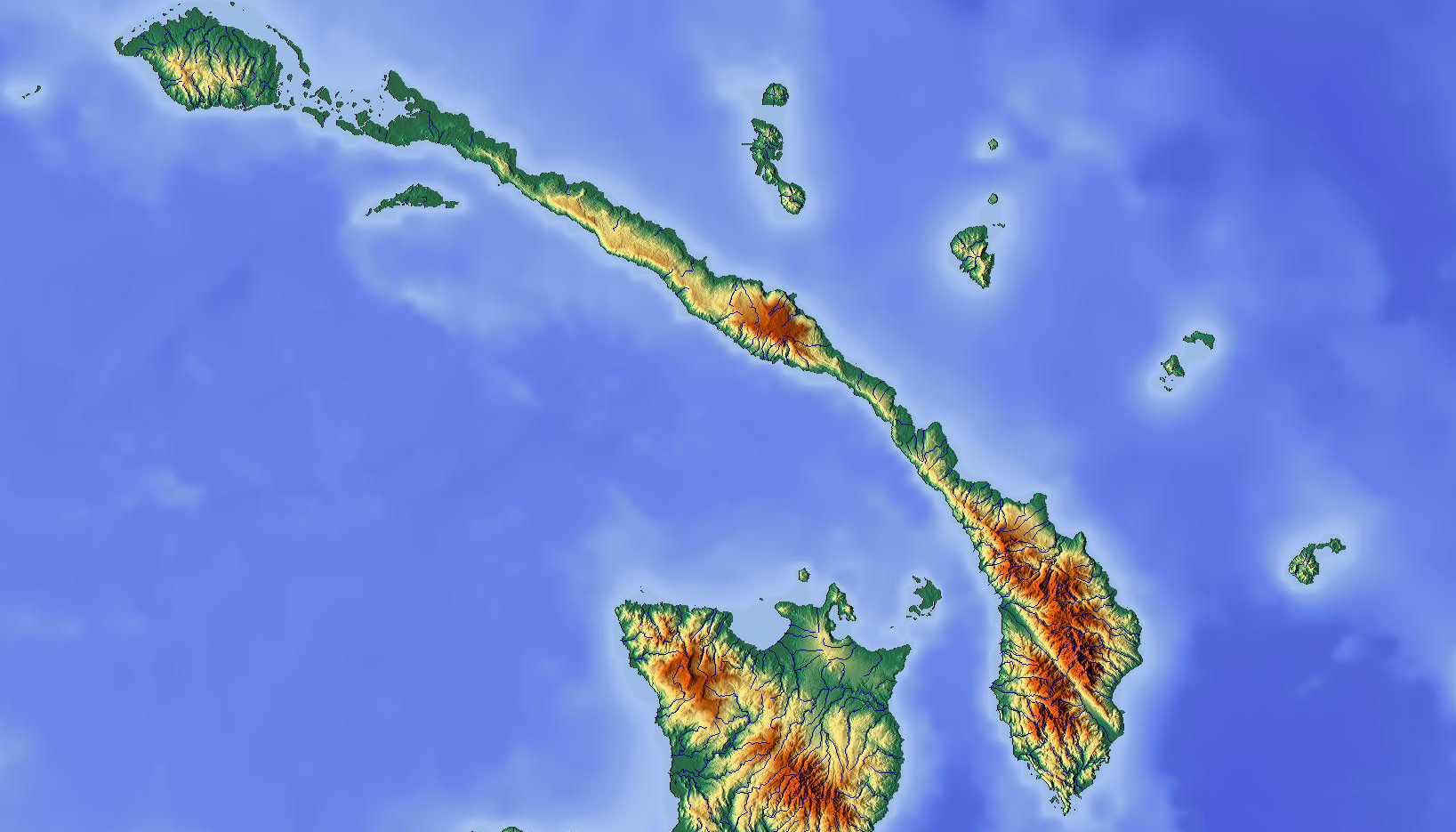
- Papua New Guinea New Ireland Province

Geography
- Location: Oceania
- Coordinates: 4.850°S 152.877°E

Cape St. George is the southernmost point on the island of New Ireland, Papua New Guinea. It was the namesake for the Battle of Cape St. George, fought on 26 November 1943, between New Ireland and Buka.

== History ==
During World War II Saint George's Channel was used by the Imperial Japanese Navy connecting Rabaul to the open sea and for ships bound for the Solomon Islands. Allied missions against Japanese forces at Cape St. George and St. George's Channel were conducted on December 31, 1942 – October 26, 1944.

In the course of Pacific War the Japanese used the Cape to watch out for American bombers from Guadalcanal heading towards Rabaul. The concrete bunker they built is still there. From information gathered from men from Lambom Village who are the traditional land owners and most of whom have either died or are now very old and who were forced to work for the Japanese, the Japanese commander/officer-in-charge during the war was called Kato. Apart from its association with the war in the Pacific and particularly in the New Guinea Islands region, "Cape St. George" is traditionally known in the local Siar language as Lain Silou – this is in reference to its protruding point into the outer sea and the fact that it is quite dangerous during rough seas to ships sailing past/around it.

On February 3, 1944, Medal of Honor recipient, Lt Robert M. Hanson, VMF-215, participated in a fighter sweep. On the return flight he strafed the lighthouse on Cape St. George, New Ireland, that served as an enemy flak tower and observation post. Making his run low on the deck, his blue-gray Corsair took a flak hit to the wing. Hanson tried to ditch but his wing dug into the water and the Corsair cartwheeled and crashed, leaving an oil slick and scattered debris.

== See also ==
- Battle of Cape St. George
