= Battle of Tsimba Ridge =

1945 engagement of WWII between Australian and Japanese forces

- Part of the Bougainville Campaign of the Pacific Theater (World War II)
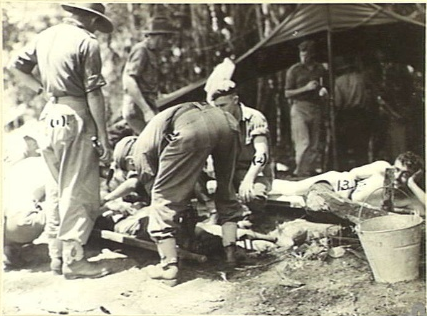
- Australian casualties being treated at the 31st/51st Infantry Battalion regimental aid post, 6 February 1945
Date	17 January – 9 February 1945 (Note: The main fighting around Tsimba Ridge took place between 17 January and 9 February, however, fighting in the area around the ridge along the Genga River continued until 22 February.)
Location	Bougainville, New Guinea 5°38′33″S 154°44′48″E
Result	Allied victory

Belligerents
Australia	Japan

Commanders and leaders
(Australia) Joseph Kelly	(Empire of Japan) Shinzo Nakamura

Units involved
31st/51st Infantry Battalion	81st Infantry Regiment

Strength
~800 men	~900 men

Casualties and losses
12 killed, 20 wounded	66 killed

The Battle of Tsimba Ridge was an engagement of the Second World War involving Australian and Japanese forces. Part of the wider Bougainville campaign of the Pacific theatre, the battle occurred in the northern sector of Bougainville Island between 17 January and 9 February 1945, when the lead battalion of the Australian 11th Brigade—the 31st/51st Infantry Battalion—advanced towards the Genga River as part of a drive north to the Bonis Peninsula.

On the peninsula, an enclave of Japanese troops had established itself after withdrawing north following earlier engagements in the centre of the island throughout 1944–45. Coming up against heavy resistance along Tsimba Ridge, the Australians' advance was halted for three weeks as they fought to wrest control of the ridge from the defending Japanese from the 81st Infantry Regiment, whose strength was roughly equal to that of the Australians. The main Australian attack took place on 6 February, but it was not until 9 February that the Japanese completely withdrew from the position. Small-scale fighting in the surrounding area continued until 22 February. The next stage of the campaign saw the Australians take Ratsua as they sought to establish a defensive line across the base of the Bonis Peninsula between Ratsua and Ruri Bay.

== Background ==
=== Strategic situation ===
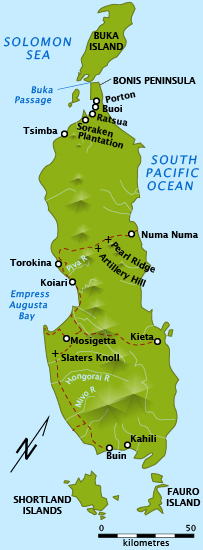
Some key locations in the Bougainville campaign.

Japanese forces had landed on Bougainville in early 1942, capturing it from the small force of Australians garrisoning the island. They had subsequently developed several airbases on the island, using it to conduct operations in the northern Solomon Islands and to attack the Allied lines of communication between the United States, Australia, and the Southwest Pacific Area. These bases also helped protect Rabaul, the major Japanese garrison and naval base in Papua New Guinea; throughout 1943, Allied planners determined that Bougainville was vital for neutralising the Japanese base around Rabaul.

US Marines conducted an amphibious landing at Cape Torokina, on the western coast of Bougainville, north of Empress Augusta Bay, in November 1943. After an initial counter-attack that was repulsed, the marines had been replaced by a garrison of US Army troops who began consolidating their position around Torokina, establishing a strong perimeter. In March 1944, the Japanese launched a heavy counter-attack, which was turned back with many casualties. After this, the situation on Bougainville became largely static, as the Japanese focused primarily on subsistence, and the US forces chose to adopt a mostly defensive posture aimed at maintaining the perimeter around Torokina.

In November–December 1944, the Australian II Corps—consisting of militia troops from the 3rd Division and the 11th Brigade—under Lieutenant General Stanley Savige took over responsibility for Allied operations on Bougainville from the American XIV Corps as part of a plan to free up the US troops for the Philippines campaign. Mistakenly believing that the Japanese forces on the island numbered just 17,500 men, it was decided that the Australians should pursue an aggressive campaign to clear the Japanese from Bougainville. After taking over the US perimeter that had been established around Torokina, the Australian campaign developed into three separate drives: in the north, it was planned that Japanese forces would be forced into the narrow Bonis Peninsula and contained; in the centre, the seizure of Pearl Ridge would give the Australians control of the east–west avenues of approach, as well as affording them protection against further counter-attacks, while also opening the way for a drive to the east coast; and the main campaign in the south, where the bulk of the Japanese forces were concentrated. Allied estimates of Japanese strength were later found to be grossly inaccurate and, after the war, it was found that the Japanese alive on the island at this time numbered closer to 40,000.

=== Preliminary moves ===
On 31 December 1944, Savige ordered Brigadier John Stevenson, commander of the 11th Brigade, to begin clearing operations along the northwest coast of the island towards Soraken Harbour, as the Australians attempted to drive the Japanese in the sector on to the narrow Bonis Peninsula. At the time the Australians believed there were around 390 Japanese defending the area surrounding the Genga River—considered to be the main Japanese defence line in the northern sector—but it was later determined to be closer to 900 men from the 81st Infantry Regiment, under the command of Lieutenant Colonel Shinzo Nakamura.

Nakamura, who, according to Peter Charlton, was considered to be a "master of jungle warfare", had been ordered to prevent the Australian advance along the coast. He had perceived the likelihood of stopping the Australians well forward of the Genga as being unlikely and had therefore decided that he would concentrate his defence around the river itself, establishing a strong position on Tsimba Ridge, about 400 metres (440 yd) south of the river. Described by war correspondent Fred Aldridge as a "horseshoe volcanic feature with steep jungle-clad sides...each toe [of the ridge ended] close to the sea, forming a natural amphitheatre by the beach", it was a "textbook fortress". According to Aldridge, it was a "maze of dugouts, trenches, [and] foxholes", and was well camouflaged and heavily defended by snipers, machine guns and artillery, while supporting elements had been placed to the north, in depth, behind the Genga, near Kunamatoro.

Taking over control of the northern sector from the 7th Brigade, which was subsequently transferred to the southern sector to take part in the main offensive, the 11th Brigade advanced along the coast from Kuraio Mission, sending out patrols into the interior to flush the Japanese out of their positions in the mountains as they went. The 31st/51st Infantry Battalion, under the command of Lieutenant Colonel Joseph Kelly (Note: Kelly later went on to command the 1st Battalion, Royal Australian Regiment after the war.) and roughly 800-strong, formed the vanguard of the advance, its main body moving along the coast road towards Amun, Sipaai and Rukussia, while patrols were sent inland from Totokei towards Lalum and Soraken, both of which were considered key Japanese positions. By 16 January 1945, the lead company of the 31st/51st reached Rukussia, having encountered no Japanese up until that point.

== Battle ==
Location of the battle in north-west Bougainville.

The first contact came on 17 January when the 31st/51st Infantry Battalion's advanced elements—drawn mainly from 'D' Company, under Captain Thomas Titley—moved north from Rukussia and proceeded towards the Genga River. Reaching a clearing 1,000 yards (910 m) north of Puto, a platoon-sized patrol came across several huts in a cleared area and proceeded to attack it. One Japanese was killed in the initial assault but, as the Australians took the huts and pushed beyond them, the Japanese engaged them from entrenchments 100 yards (91 m) in front of them. The Japanese then launched a counter-attack using light and heavy machine guns. In response, the Australians brought up another platoon and, over the course of two days, repulsed the counter-attack, with six to eight Japanese estimated to have been killed and others wounded, while two Australians were wounded.

During the engagement, the Japanese had opened up with the artillery that they had brought up in support of the main defensive position on Tsimba Ridge, (Note: The Japanese name for Tsimba Ridge was Sun Highland.) firing for the first time in the sector. This barrage was largely ineffective, inflicting only one casualty, as many of the shells proved to be faulty and did not detonate. The Australians also came across a large camp, including a field hospital, which they captured intact. Another group of huts was also discovered, from where they gained intelligence identifying the Japanese troops in the area as belonging to the 81st Infantry Regiment. They also managed to capture two 70 mm guns and ammunition for them.

On 19 January, the 31st/51st Infantry Battalion's 'A' Company, under Captain Clyde Downs, sent a platoon-sized patrol out to outflank the Japanese forward positions; this patrol moved first to the right flank and then north along the jungle tracks around Totokei and Goton. Discovering evidence of Japanese movement in the area, they proceeded to the village of Kunamatoro, about 1 mile (1.6 km) north of Junapopo. Here they encountered a force of around 30 to 50 Japanese and, after the initial contact, in which the Australian platoon commander was wounded, the patrol attacked the village. Within 10 minutes the battle was over: 14 Japanese had been killed and five wounded, while one Australian was killed, one wounded, and one missing. As darkness fell, the Australian patrol withdrew from the village.

The following day—20 January—the advanced elements of the Australian force pressed on towards Tsimba Ridge. A formation about 200 yards (180 m) long and about 60 feet (18 m) in height, and stretching westerly to the Genga River where a steep cliff fell to the southern bank of the river, the ridge blocked the Australian advance across the river, while its south-easternmost protrusion (later known to the Australians as the "Pimple") was separated by a shallow saddle. On top of the ridge, dense jungle provided good concealment, while most of the approaches to the ridge were open to observation. As the Australians approached the ridge, one of their platoons captured a 47 mm gun positioned along the coast about 1,000 yards (910 m) south of the ridge, while another platoon contacted a lone Japanese soldier, who was killed in the subsequent firefight as they entered a garden that curved along the southern approach to the ridge, and which became known as the "Amphitheatre". After the initial contact, the platoon's advance through the garden was prevented by an intense burst of fire from the ridge, but the Australians managed to scale the high ground that rose to their east and were able to occupy the south-eastern tip of the Pimple, capturing two 75 mm guns in the process.

Reports had been received from locals that the Japanese had brought reinforcements down from Soraken, Taiof Island and Tarlena, and at this point the Australians realised that the Japanese were concentrated in far greater numbers than anticipated and had in fact established their line of resistance in the sector upon the ridge. This was confirmed later after the Australians moved forward once more on 21 January, moving to within 800 yards (730 m) of the Genga River, where the track upon which they were advancing opened into a large garden that curved around the edge of Tsimba Ridge, from where the Japanese defenders had an excellent line of sight. Subsequent patrols determined the extent of the Japanese position, reporting that they had constructed a well-fortified position with a continuous trench along the crest of ridge, weapons pits and pill boxes, all with clear fields of fire, stretching up to 150 yards (140 m).

The Australian commander, Kelly, ordered 'B' Company to move up and take the ridge and over the course of a week between 21 and 28 January they made several attempts against various parts of the ridge, approaching from the south, southeast and the north. These proved fruitless, although one platoon managed to encircle the position from the north before being engaged with heavy machine gun fire. On 23 January, the Australians established fire support in the form of guns from the 2nd Mountain Battery. Another three unsuccessful attempts were made on 24 January, and on 25 January 'C' Company carried out a movement to the flank in an attempt to get around behind the ridge and attack from the north. Crossing the crocodile-infested waters of the Genga about 600 yards (550 m) from the ridge, the Australians established a bridgehead across the river with a line of communications back to the Pimple, which they kept open by constantly patrolling along it.

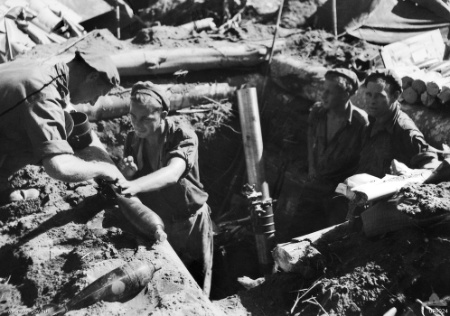
A 4.2-inch mortar of the 101st Brigade Support Company in action during the 31st/51st Infantry Battalion's attack on 6 February

Over the following six days, the Japanese attacked the bridgehead, launching a series of assaults that, in the words of Robert Burla, bordered upon suicidal. These attacks were repulsed and the Australians began to launch patrols in all directions around the ridge. On 29 January, the Japanese launched a large-scale attack on 'C' Company's positions and although the Australians resisted, the attack succeeded in breaking through one part of the perimeter and managed to roll up the position all the way to the main battalion position around Puto before it was turned back. The Australian counter-attack, organised by the 'C' Company's commander, Captain Alwyn Shilton, and supported by accurate artillery fire, came on 1 February and resulted in over 30 Japanese killed or wounded.

Over the next few days the Japanese made further probes, which were also repulsed, and the Australians consolidated their positions prior to an assault on the ridge. Preparations included the manhandling of a mountain gun from Puto to a position 150 yards (140 m) from the Pimple, from where it could fire directly upon the Japanese positions on the ridge, while aircraft from No. 5 Squadron, Royal Australian Air Force, carried out reconnaissance. To maintain the secrecy of these preparations, mortar fire was brought down upon the Japanese positions to mask the sounds of digging and movement while fire from Vickers machine guns kept the Japanese defenders from being able to leave their shelter and observe.

After a day-long artillery barrage, the main attack took place on 6 February. Supported by a barrage of over 500 artillery shells and mortar bombs, and airstrikes from Australian Wirraways and New Zealand Corsairs, three platoons from Captain Millett Harris's 'B' Company assaulted the ridge from different points in an effort to encircle the defenders. Following the preparatory artillery fire, the attack began at 09:00 hours when two platoons—10 and 11 Platoons—along with company headquarters formed up south-east of the amphitheatre and began to advance to the north-west 200 yards (180 m) to attack the ridge from behind, while another force—12 Platoon—attacked from the garden, moving around the Pimple before assaulting the ridge from the east. From the north-west, 10 Platoon, in the centre, managed to capture its objectives by 09:25 hours; however, 12 Platoon came under intense fire and after suffering several casualties stopped their advance. By 11:30 hours the northernmost Australian platoon, 11 Platoon, had reached the high ground on the north-western side of the ridge, completing the encirclement of the Japanese. The defenders subsequently withdrew from their forward positions, but refused to give up the position, occupying the reverse slope on the western side of the ridge. The attack cost the Australians nine killed and 20 wounded.

Throughout the night, Japanese artillery was very active, firing down on the Australian positions around The Pimple, after which a "banzai attack" was launched early on 7 February. Although repulsed, it enabled the Japanese to maintain a small pocket of resistance on the western tip of the ridge. On the evening of 7 February, Captain Kawakami's 10th Company from the III Battalion, 81st Infantry Regiment, withdrew. Nevertheless, a small Japanese force remained until 9 February when the Australians called down an airstrike upon the position and the defenders withdrew from the feature. One of the Australians, Private Colin Jorgensen, was awarded the Military Medal for charging a Japanese weapon pit and knocking it out of action during the final assault.

== Aftermath ==
Fighting around the Genga River continued for the next couple of days, with clashes occurring until the Australians had cleared the northern and southern banks by 11 February, during which time Japanese artillery opened up on the Australians, causing several casualties. In securing the ridge, the Australians captured a large amount of Japanese equipment, including four field and six anti-tank guns, nine machine guns and 86 rifles. Japanese casualties were estimated at 66 killed, while Australian casualties in the Tsimba area were 12 killed and 20 wounded. Within the context of the campaign, these losses were considered heavy by the Australians, and an Australian newspaper report from shortly after the battle described it as the "bloodiest battle of the campaign", while another described it as "fiercest" fought on Bougainville up to that point. From documents captured after the war, it was shown that the Japanese believed that these losses would slow the Australian advance. At the time they did not perceive the loss of Tsimba Ridge to be a defeat. They had been prepared to hold the position, and had the numbers to do it; however, Nakamura had decided to withdraw from the ridge when the morale of his troops had fallen due to lack of ammunition and food, and rising casualties from tropical diseases. The real size of the force holding Tsimba Ridge was also revealed by documents captured after the war, highlighting the gross underestimation of Japanese strength by Australian intelligence sources.

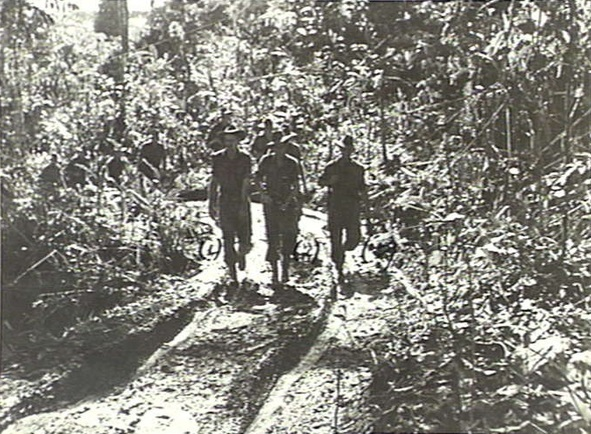
Soldiers from the Australian 31st/51st Infantry Battalion patrol around Tsimba Ridge after the main fighting, 17 February 1945

After the fall of Tsimba Ridge, fighting continued around the Genga River for the next couple of weeks. By 10 February the area south of the Genga had been cleared of Japanese and the Australians began to patrol along the northern bank. Several minor clashes occurred, the most serious of which saw three Japanese killed and three Australians wounded when the Australians managed to capture a Japanese 37 mm gun. As the Japanese were forced to withdraw from a position along the track which ran 150 yards (140 m) from the river, the Japanese artillery intensified and several men from the 31st/51st Infantry Battalion became casualties.

The 31st/51st Infantry Battalion continued operations around the Genga River until 26 February, by which time three companies had reached the Gillman River, while another had struck inland, fighting a short engagement around Kunamatoro, before pressing on towards a ridge near the Soraken Plantation. Throughout the final weeks of February, 'A' Company of the 31st/51st, under Downs, fought the Japanese defenders off the position, which was subsequently named "Downs' Ridge" by the Australians. On 26 February, the 31st/51st was relieved by Lieutenant Colonel Bernard Callinan's 26th Infantry Battalion, who continued the advance north towards the Soraken Peninsula, while the 55th/53rd Infantry Battalion advanced on Ratsua as the Australians sought to establish a defensive line across the base of the Bonis Peninsula between Ratsua and Ruri Bay. The 31st/51st would later take part in the failed landing at Porton Plantation in June, where they would suffer heavy casualties, including Downs, who was killed leading his company. In total, the Australians lost 34 killed and 91 wounded in the fighting around the Genga River, while it was estimated that the Japanese lost 148 killed. For its involvement in taking Tsimba Ridge, the 31st/51st Infantry Battalion was awarded the battle honour "Tsimba Ridge".

== Notes ==
Footnotes

Citations
