= Arnold Potts =

Australian brigadier

Arnold William Potts
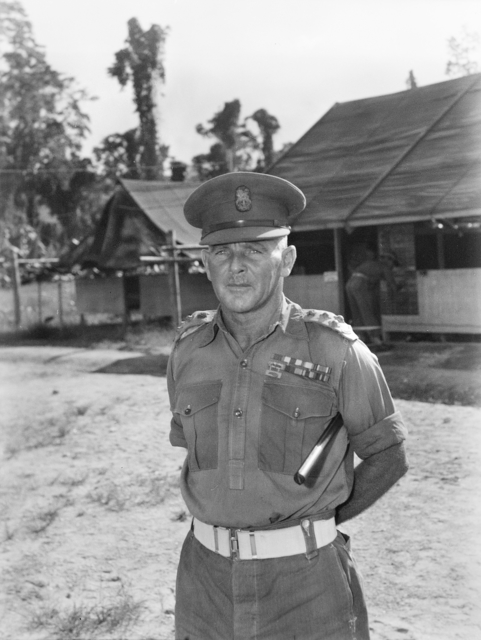
- Arnold Potts at Torokina, Bougainville on 25 November 1945
- Born: 16 September 1896; Peel, Isle of Man
- Died: 1 January 1968 (aged 71); Perth, Western Australia
- Military career
- Allegiance: Australia
- Branch: Australian Army
- Service years: 1914–1945
- Rank: Brigadier
- Service number: WX1574
- Commands: 23rd Brigade (1942–45); 21st Brigade (1942); Maroubra Force (1942); 2/16th Battalion (1941–42)
- Conflicts: First World War; Gallipoli Campaign; Western Front; Second World War; Syria-Lebanon Campaign; Kokoda Track Campaign; Bougainville campaign
- Awards: Distinguished Service Order; Officer of the Order of the British Empire; Military Cross; Mentioned in Despatches (4)
- Other work: Farmer and grazier

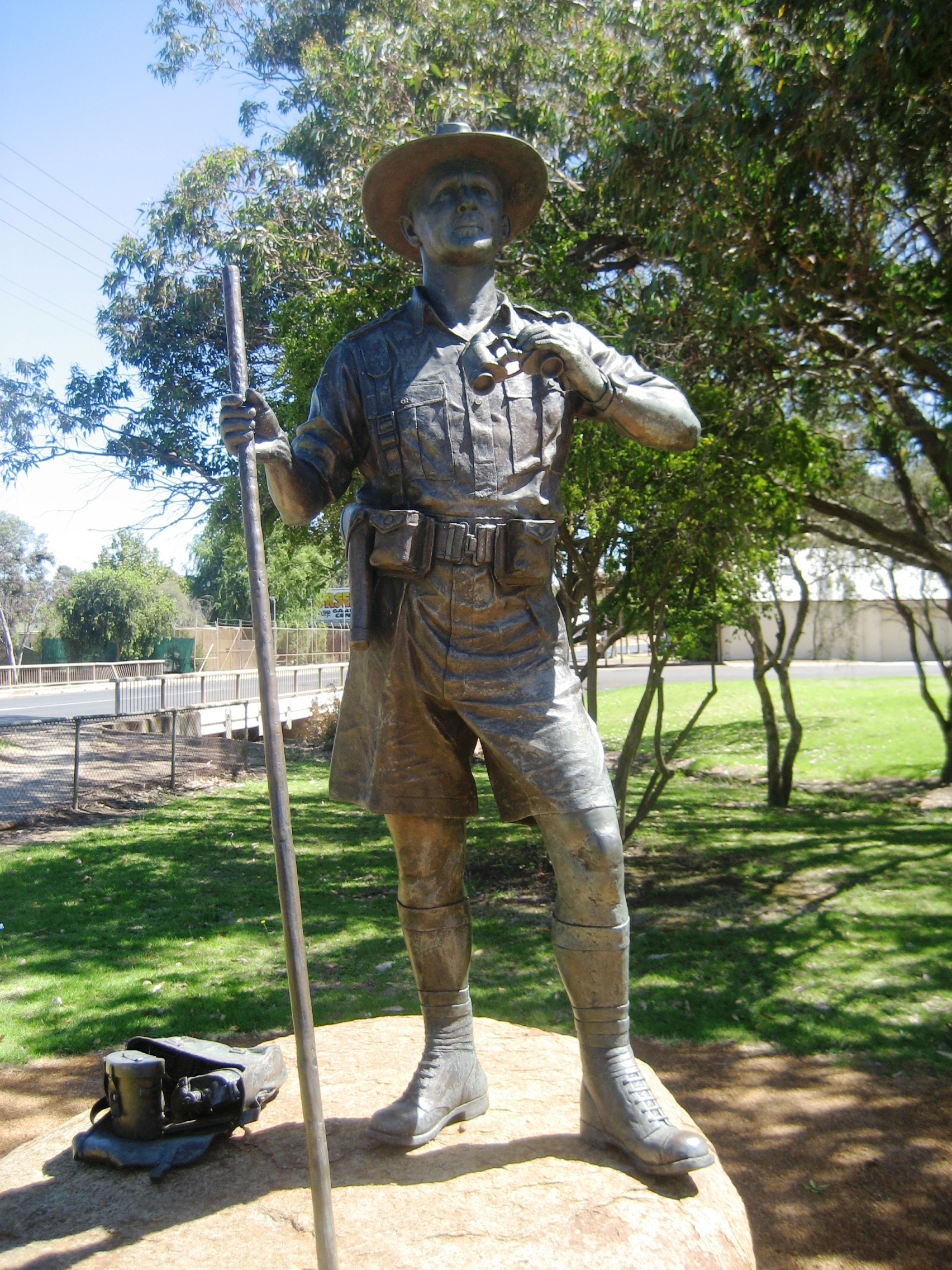
Bronze statue of Brigadier Potts at Kojonup, Western Australia

Brigadier Arnold William Potts, DSO, OBE, MC (16 September 1896 – 1 January 1968) was an Australian grazier and army officer who served in the First World War and later commanded the 21st Brigade of the Second Australian Imperial Force during the Kokoda Track campaign of the Second World War.

Potts' leadership during the brigade's fighting withdrawal along the Kokoda Track against Japanese forces has been described by military historian Peter Brune as "one of the most critical triumphs in Australian military history and one that an apathetic nation has still to honour". Despite his role in halting the Japanese advance, he was relieved of command by General Sir Thomas Blamey in October 1942, a decision that has been the subject of historical debate. Several contemporaries, as well as Potts’ official biographer, have criticised the dismissal, with some considering it among the more controversial decisions of Blamey's career.

Following his removal from the Kokoda campaign, Potts was appointed to command the 23rd Brigade during the Bougainville campaign, where he was noted for his high standards of leadership. After the war, he retired from military service and later pursued a career in politics, although unsuccessfully. Potts died in 1968 at the age of 71.

== Early life ==
Arnold Potts was born on 16 September 1896 at Peel on the Isle of Man to William, a schoolmaster, and Mary Potts. In 1904, at the age of eight, Potts' family emigrated to Western Australia and he attended Cottesloe State School before progressing on to Guilford Grammar School. During his formative years he was a keen sportsman, even despite his short stature, representing Guilford in rowing, football, shooting and athletics.

A natural leader, he became a prefect and rose to the rank of colour sergeant in the school's Cadet unit. In 1913, Potts sat and passed the University of Adelaide's entrance exam for English, geometry and trigonometry. In early 1914 he left Guilford and moved to Pinjarra where he attended Fairbridge Farm School, working as a farmhand. Upon his arrival in Pinjarra, Potts—having turned 18—progressed from the Senior Cadets to the Citizens Force, after which he transferred to the 86th Infantry Regiment.

== First World War ==
Following the outbreak of the First World War in the summer of 1914 Potts requested to the join the Australian Imperial Force (AIF), a volunteer force that was being formed for active service overseas. On 26 January 1915 he was called up and he was quickly promoted to acting sergeant while still only 18, due both to his prior service and his obvious leadership qualities. He soon earned the respect of his men, most of whom were much older than he. Potts was posted as a reinforcement to 16th Battalion at Gallipoli in July, just in time to participate in the bloody battles of 7 and 8 August.

He stayed with the battalion after it was evacuated from the peninsula in December 1915. In January 1916, Potts was commissioned second lieutenant. In July 1916, following a period of re-organisation in Egypt, the infantry units of the AIF were transferred to the Western Front in France and Belgium. In August, Potts, who by this time had been promoted to lieutenant and given command of the 4th Light Trench Mortar Battery, was awarded the Military Cross for gallantry during the Battle of Mouquet Farm. He had led his battery in unstinting support of the rest of the battalion during its advance, even though the battery itself had been almost continually under attack in the most horrendous of conditions. The citation for the medal reads:

For conspicuous gallantry in action. He handled his Trench Mortar Battery with great courage and determination. Later, during an enemy counter-attack, his coolness and ability were largely responsible for the repulse of the enemy.

Later in the war, having been promoted to captain, Potts was able to transfer back to the 16th Battalion and on 6 July 1918, near Hamel, he received a serious gunshot wound in the chest, which he barely survived.

== Inter war years ==
As a result of his wounds, Potts was classified as 20 per cent disabled, and after repatriation in early 1919 he returned to Western Australia where he worked as a jackaroo until he purchased his own farm in Kojonup, Western Australia in 1920. He continued to serve part-time in the Militia, however, in 1922 he was placed on the Reserve of Officers list and effectively retired due to defence cutbacks at the time. In 1926 he married Doreen (Dawn) Wigglesworth. They had three children; David (1928), Judith (1932) and Nancy (1938). His letters to his wife throughout his military career provide an insight into his opinions and feelings on events.

In 1938, as tensions in Europe grew, Potts became involved with the Militia again and was instrumental in the re-formation of the 25th Light Horse Regiment.

== Second World War ==
Following the outbreak of the Second World War, Potts was placed in command of the regiment's 'B' Squadron and he set to work training the young national servicemen that were assigned to the unit following the resumption of the compulsory training scheme. As the provisions of the Defence Act (1903) still precluded the Militia from being sent outside of Australian territory to fight, an all volunteer force was raised for overseas service known as the Second Australian Imperial Force. In April 1940, Potts requested a transfer to this force and although still suffering from the effects of the wounds he had received in 1918 he was passed medically fit and granted the rank of major. He was assigned to the newly formed 2/16th Battalion. Although by now 44 years of age, he was a dynamic and widely respected officer. He played a key role in staffing the battalion and getting it ready for action in Syria in 1941, where he was awarded the Distinguished Service Order for inspiring leadership at the Battle of the Litani River on 9 and 10 June. His performance during the Syrian campaign was further rewarded with a Mention in Despatches, promotion to lieutenant colonel and command of the 2/16th.

=== Kokoda Trail Campaign ===
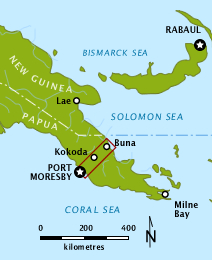
Location of the Kokoda Trail within Territory of Papua, 1942. The highlighted area is shown in the map below.

In 1942 Potts returned to Australia and in April he was promoted to temporary brigadier and given command of the 21st Brigade, stationed in south-east Queensland. At this time the Japanese had established a beachhead on the north coast of New Guinea. It was clear to Potts that the 21st would soon be fighting in the jungle. He devised and implemented the first specific jungle training for Australian troops. Potts took his troops up into the Blackall Range, where the thick scrub and steep grades gave these experienced desert fighters an idea of what lay ahead for them. War game exercises indicated that in such country communications would break down, and evacuation of wounded would be difficult.

Meanwhile, the Japanese had advanced south from their beachhead at Gona and Buna, and taken the strategic village of Kokoda. General Douglas MacArthur, Supreme Commander of South West Pacific Area, was at this time planning a landing on Japanese-held Guadalcanal in the Solomon Islands. Concerned that enemy troops would be withdrawn from Gona to reinforce Guadalcanal, MacArthur asked for a serious commitment of Australian troops to New Guinea. The 21st Brigade was sent to Port Moresby, and the 25th Brigade to Milne Bay. Potts flew into Port Moresby on 8 August and set up a staging post at Koitaki, close to the start of the trail at Owers Corner. His orders were clear yet daunting: recapture Kokoda so it could be used as a base to push the Japanese back to Gona.

At this time the two militia battalions—the 39th and 53rd Battalions—who had been defeated at Kokoda were dug in at Isurava and Alola. These were to join with the three battalions of the 21st to form "Maroubra Force" under Potts' command. On 16 August his 2/14th started on the long and difficult trail towards Myola. The 2/16th followed the next day, with the 2/27th left at Port Moresby as a reserve. Potts was promised 40,000 rations would await him at Myola, to be dropped in by Dakota transport planes. The night before beginning the trek, Potts had learned that a further 1,800 Japanese combat troops had landed at Gona.

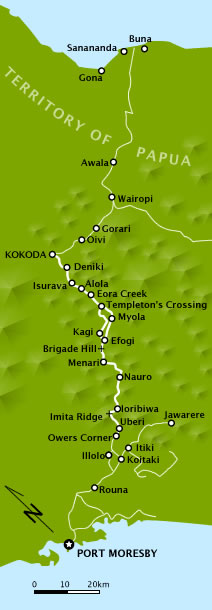
Some key locations along the Kokoda Trail. Potts led a fighting withdrawal from Isurava as far as Nauro before being relieved of command.

Despite their jungle training, the Australians found the going incredibly difficult. Captain R.N. Thompson of the 2/14th said "I was one of the fittest members, but on the second day, climbing the Golden Stairs I was extremely fatigued. A small dixie of tea made me vomit and I could not eat." While they struggled over the ranges, the Japanese bombed the Port Moresby airfield, destroying two of the Dakotas. When Potts reached Myola he found only 5,000 rations. Mystery and controversy abound regarding the missing rations. Potts seems to have harboured doubts about the air drops, as he had each soldier carry five days' rations to Myola.

Without rations, the 2/14th and 2/16th could not continue on to reinforce the more advanced militia battalions at Alola and Isurava. Potts made his way forward to Alola and assumed command of Maroubra Force from Brigadier Selwyn Porter on 23 August 1942. When he saw the shattered state of the 39th Battalion, he realised that to achieve his aims he would need to bring forward the relatively fresh 21st Brigade troops. Before he had a chance to implement this, the Japanese under Major General Tomitaro Horii attacked the 39th at Isurava on 26 August. For four days the Australians held off the enemy who had superiority in numbers and supplies. Potts moved in the 2/14th and 2/16th to support. The Japanese held elevated positions on either side of the main trail, and were able to hammer Maroubra Force with mortar and machine gun fire. Threatened with encirclement, Potts withdrew in stages, mounting small delaying actions where possible. Maroubra Force reached Efogi on 5 September.

On 3 September Potts had received orders from his superior in Port Morseby, Major General Arthur "Tubby" Allen, to hold Myola and gather for an offensive. However he considered the dry lake bed at Myola, surrounded by heights, as untenable. The following day, he signalled Allen, stating: "Country unsuitable for defended localities. Regret necessity abandon Myola. No reserves for counter-attack." Potts destroyed all supplies at Myola and moved south to the next suitable feature, Brigade Hill. Potts had been pleading with Allen for some time to be given his third battalion, the 2/27th. MacArthur insisted they stay at Port Moresby until success was gained at Milne Bay. Finally Allen released the 2/27th, who came up to join Maroubra Force at Kagi on 4 September, relieving the 39th Battalion. When the 2/14th and 2/16th arrived on 6 September, Potts finally had a full brigade. He aimed at holding each position for maximum time and at maximum cost to the enemy, before withdrawing. He was aware that with each mile back towards Port Moresby the Japanese supply and communication line became longer and more fragile.

==== Battle of Brigade Hill ====
Maroubra Force dug in on Brigade Hill, and awaited an attack. After dark on 6 September Horii's pursuing force appeared, slowly and carefully coming down the steep slope opposite the Australian position, their way lit by "lanterns" made of pieces of smouldering Australian rubber-coated signal wire. Horii patiently took his troops in a wide encircling movement around the Australians, despite a bombing raid called in by the alarmed Potts. Next morning Potts signalled Allen; "Will not give ground if you guarantee my line of communication ... full of fight, but physically below par, mainly feet and dysentery ... Respectfully consider offensive ops require more than one Bde [brigade] task."

At 4.30 am on 8 September the attack came, initially frontal, then a flank attack of 5,000 men cut off Potts' Brigade HQ battalion from the rest of the force. At times the enemy were just 15 metres (16 yd) from the edge of Potts' perimeter. The signal wire had been cut by now, and communications with the battalions were shaky. A message got through by wireless transmitter, that if as seemed likely the HQ was wiped out, Major Anthony Caro, commander of 2/16th was to take command of the brigade and fall back to Menari. Potts and his HQ were saved by the fact that Horii did not concentrate forces on eliminating them, instead maintaining overall pressure to try to annihilate all three battalions. 2/14th and 2/16th charged the Japanese lines but failed to break through to HQ. However the damage inflicted on the enemy was crucial in slowing their pursuit, as Potts made his way to Menari. He left orders for the battalions to make their own way and rejoin him there. As the Japanese controlled the main trail, all three battalions had to take rough secondary tracks or go cross country.

One major difference from battles in other theatres of the war was the burden of the wounded on their unit. They could not be left for the enemy to care for, as had been the case in Syria. Years later Potts recalled "We had to sit in the jungle listening to the screams of comrades tortured by the Japanese in an attempt to provoke an attack". Papuan bearers were not used in battle zones, so the wounded had to be carried by their comrades, slowing them down. 2/14th and 2/16th left their wounded to be carried by 2/27th, the last battalion to withdraw. 120 men at a time were engaged carrying stretcher cases. Many severely wounded men walked to free a stretcher for someone worse off than themselves. The Japanese pursued the 2/27th, but an audacious counterattack by 'B' and 'D' Companies bought the Australian rearguard some time. The adjutant of the 2/27th, Captain Harry Katekar, was quoted as saying, "The Japs were so shocked they broke contact. We didn't see them again that day".

The 2/14th and 2/16th Battalions slept where they fell on the trail on the night of 8 September, but managed to re-unite with Potts and 21st Brigade headquarters at Menari the next day. The 2/27th Battalion was unable to reach the village before the rest of the brigade was again forced to retreat by the advancing Japanese. Menari was extremely exposed to observation from further up the trail, and the village was already under barrage from Japanese artillery and light machine guns by the time the first 2/16th troops arrived. Potts waited for the 2/27th until 2.30 pm, then gave orders to abandon Menari. The 2/27th and their cargo of wounded from the other battalions were forced to follow paths parallel to the main trail, but eventually rejoined the main Australian force at Jawarere.

==== Rowell relieves Potts ====
During the Battle of Brigade Hill an Intelligence officer, Captain Geoff Lyon arrived from Port Moresby, sent by Allen to give him an on-the-ground assessment. He was able to contact Potts, and relayed to Allen the situation as it was at that moment—dire. Allen responded with a signal to Potts: "Has [Lyon's] message been sent with your approval? Is situation stated correct? Advise immediately." Potts, under close attack and facing being wiped out, replied simply "Message confirmed".

It was at this point that the commander of New Guinea Force, Lieutenant General Sydney Rowell decided to recall Potts to Port Moresby, returning Porter to command of the 21st Brigade. Rowell's motives have been debated, but they appear to be a combination of frustration at the lack of forward movement, and a desire to have a first hand account of the situation. Rowell did not consult with Allen. He also sent a message to Major General George Alan Vasey, Deputy Chief of General Staff, informing him of Potts' removal. He continued "I trust you appreciate the gravity of immediate situation, and will produce additional troops asked for particularly infantry, with minimum delay".

When Potts arrived back in Port Moresby on 12 September Allen organised a meeting between Potts, Rowell and himself. Given a chance to relate the difficulties he had faced, and correct some misapprehensions, it appears Potts was able to mollify Rowell. Soon after, war correspondent Chester Wilmot, who had also been over the Owen Stanley Ranges on foot and seen the fighting, was able to corroborate Potts' account in a meeting with Rowell.

==== Kokoda Trail Campaign after Potts' removal ====
Subsequent events serve to illustrate Potts' difficulties, and his success against the odds in command of the 21st Brigade. Potts handed over to Porter on 10 September at Nauro. Porter's first move was towards Port Moresby—to higher ground at Ioribiwa. Here he was joined by the 25th Brigade under Brigadier Ken Eather. With fresh troops, fighting an overstretched enemy, Eather still found he needed to withdraw to Imita Ridge. Rowell acceded to this request, but instructed Allen "any further withdrawal is out of the question". In August the Americans had landed at Guadalcanal. Now the Japanese hierarchy ordered Horii to make a fighting withdrawal to the Gona/Buna beachhead. The quick fall of Port Moresby they had anticipated had not come about, and as the campaign dragged on it was proving a drain on men and materiel needed elsewhere. After dealing with the American incursion at Guadalcanal, a new attack over the mountains of Papua could begin.

Potts' initial task had been to retake the village of Kokoda. In the end the 25th Brigade walked in and took vacant possession on 2 November, the Japanese having abandoned it some time before. The Japanese were by now a shadow of the powerful force that had faced Potts in August. The survivors were riddled with dysentery and starving. Some evidence points to cannibalism. Japanese war correspondent Seizo Okada reported that after receiving the order to return to Buna, "for a time the soldiers remained stupefied among the rocks on the mountain side. Then they began to move, and once in retreat they fled for dear life ... discipline was completely forgotten".

==== Potts loses a supporter ====
On 12 September General Sir Thomas Blamey visited Port Moresby. At this point Maroubra Force (still under Potts) had withdrawn to Ioribiwa, but nearby the fresh 25th Brigade under Eather were about to step into the breach. Allen and Rowell were confident of prompt success against a clearly exhausted enemy, and Blamey was easily convinced to share their optimism. There were smiles all round as he flew back to Australia. He briefed Prime Minister John Curtin and the rest of the Advisory War Council on 17 September. Despite being met with some scepticism, Blamey supported his officers and maintained that there was nothing to fear—Port Moresby was safe from land attack.

That night Curtin received a call from MacArthur, who had just heard about Eather's withdrawal to Imita Ridge. MacArthur told Curtin to send Blamey back to Papua to take personal command of New Guinea Force. Curtin did so, and Blamey arrived in Port Moresby on 23 September. This put Rowell and Blamey on a collision course. They had a history of animosity going back to earlier in the war, first in the Middle East then in Greece. Rowell felt that Blamey should have supported him and stood up to Curtin and MacArthur. Relations were fractious, and on 28 September Rowell had had enough. He spoke his mind to his commanding officer, and was dismissed. Potts had just lost his major advocate in Papua.

==== Blamey confronts Potts ====
On 9 October the 21st Brigade regained their start point at Koitaki. Before the last troops had even made it in from the jungle, Allen asked for a parade. He passed on a personal message from Curtin to the brigade, for "saving Port Moresby and thus Australia". On 22 October Blamey visited Koitaki at short notice. He requested a private audience with Potts, and Brigade HQ was vacated. Potts' Staff Captain Ken Murdoch was deeply involved in paperwork and somehow remained to witness the "private" conversation. According to Murdoch, Potts, fresh from Allen's glowing endorsement, began by extolling the virtues of his men, and expressed satisfaction with the boost to home front morale they had been able to provide.

Blamey cut him short. He relieved Potts of his command, citing Potts' failure to hold back the Japanese, despite commanding "superior forces". Further, Potts had failed to re-take Kokoda despite explicit orders to do so. Blamey explained that Prime Minister John Curtin had told him to say that failures like Kokoda campaign would not be tolerated. Murdoch reports Blamey saying "the men had shown that something was lacking" and that their leaders were to blame. Potts furiously rejected any blame being attached to his battalion commanders. Blamey was not interested in debating the finer points, nor in allowing Potts to remain in contact with those same battalion commanders. He was to leave the brigade immediately and fly to Darwin—a personal address to the brigade would not be possible, nor could he meet and brief his replacement. Murdoch says that the news spread rapidly, and as Staff Captain he was inundated with resignation papers from officers wishing to show solidarity with Potts. Potts instructed Murdoch to reject all resignations.

Rowell was replaced by Lieutenant General Edmund Herring, a man close to Blamey. Now Herring chose Brigadier Ivan Dougherty to replace Potts. During his recent period of command in the Northern Territory, Herring had relieved both his brigadiers, replacing them with younger and better educated officers, one of whom was Dougherty, an officer in whom he had great confidence. Herring believed that his decision to replace Potts with Dougherty, who would command the 21st Brigade for the rest of the war, was the right one. Years later he told official historian Dudley McCarthy that: "We knew the terrain was most difficult and the Japs very good jungle fighters ... we had a war to win and it was our job to call in the best man we could. It would have been wrong for us to allow ourselves to be influenced by Potts' feelings."

Potts' removal could charitably be attributed to Blamey's inadequate understanding of the circumstances Potts had dealt with on the Kokoda Trail. He may have genuinely believed that another commander in the same circumstances would have pushed back the Japanese and re-taken Kokoda. This is the tack taken by Dudley McCarthy in the official war history; "Blamey and Herring, who did not at that time understand so well the circumstances in which Potts found himself and the way he had acquitted himself, genuinely misjudged him". Other historians feel that Potts was a scapegoat, removed by Blamey to avoid a showdown with MacArthur. MacArthur maintained in a letter to the Chief of Staff of the United States Army, General George Marshall, on 6 September that "the Australians have proven themselves unable to match the enemy in jungle fighting. Aggressive leadership is lacking". Peter Brune alleges that Blamey's removal of Potts was simple self-preservation. "It is staggering to contemplate that an Australian brigade commander could be thrust into a campaign with such a damning inadequacy of military intelligence, support and equipment and yet fight a near flawless fighting withdrawal where the military and political stakes were so terribly important and that could then be relieved from his command as a reward." General Robert Eichelberger wrote to Herring in 1959, after McCarthy's history appeared:

It is a funny thing about historians. If a general relieves a subordinate at any time he is immediately attacked. Whereas in our football game, if you have a better player for a particular play, you always play him, and everyone expects you to do this. I have little doubt that the same is true of your ball game. War historians never seem to give generals the credit for having thought that X might be better than Y for the next phase of operations.

==== The "running rabbits" incident ====
On 9 November Blamey addressed the men of the 21st Brigade on the parade ground at Koitaki. The men of Maroubra Force expected congratulations for their efforts in holding back the Japanese. However, instead of praising them, Blamey told the brigade that they had been "beaten" by inferior forces, and that "no soldier should be afraid to die". Captain H.D. "Blue" Steward, medical officer of the 2/16th recalled "The troops could have withstood the Japanese field gun more easily than what they received. Blamey got them on edge almost at once by saying that they had been beaten by inferior troops in inferior numbers. Then he made his famous remark that 'the rabbit that ran away is the rabbit that got shot'. The whole parade was almost molten with rage and indignation." Blamey's personal assistant Lieutenant Colonel Norman Carlyon, realised that damage had been done. "Standing beside the small platform from which Blamey was to address the troops, I realised that he was in a most aggressive mood. He was soon expressing this in harsh words ... It amazed me that Blamey should deal so insensitively with the men of such a well-proven brigade."

After the rank and file had left, Blamey addressed the officers. He questioned whether they were worthy of their men, and told them they must improve. Potts was initially dismissive about Blamey's address, when informed about it by Major Albert Caro. He passed on the news in a letter to Dawn; "... apparently most of the troops take the speech as a colossal joke against the speaker..." He did however write to Allen asking him to "take the necessary action" regarding Blamey's remarks. By the New Year he had been given further details and was enraged. Again writing to his wife; "Hugh sent me a precis of his (T's) speech to the old team and to the officers. Hells Bells, it was a cowardly bit of work and untrue in every detail. I'll fry his soul in the next world for that bit of 'passing the buck'. Surely a man in his position is big enough to carry his own mistakes."

Potts was not the victim of the Koitaki speech. He had already been removed, and appears to have been already marked for minor roles only in the rest of the war. Although Potts was incensed, the real damage done at Koitaki was to the careers of the next generation of young officers. Potts was aware as the war proceeded that men he had trained, cajoled, blasted, encouraged and fought alongside were damned for their association with him. Some have alleged that 21st Brigade's next combat role in the battle for Gona saw excessive casualties, due to the burning desire to erase Blamey's slur. "By the time the battle for Gona had concluded, the Blamey slur at Koitaki had manifested itself in the interference in the command structure, and the resultant slaughter of soldiers."

=== In Darwin with 23rd Brigade ===
Potts replaced Dougherty as commander of the 23rd Brigade in Darwin. It had originally been an AIF brigade, composed of volunteers who were able to serve abroad. As the Japanese advanced through 1941 and 1942, its original battalions had been sent to Ambon, Rabaul and Timor. They were replaced with battalions from the Militia, men who had been conscripted, and could only serve on Australian soil unless they volunteered for the AIF. Friction was inevitable, and the new officers were not all talented man-managers.

With his new brigade, Potts had a new set of battalion commanders, who he proceeded to push to meet his high standards. His methods did not always meet with approval from his superiors. Meanwhile, he was distressed to hear news of his former charges in 21st Brigade. Under Dougherty at Gona they had been thrown against an entrenched Japanese force, which had been massively underestimated in strength. Many good men who had fought alongside Potts in the Middle East and Kokoda died at Gona. He wrote to Dawn "...it's a hundred times worse taking that sort of punch [hearing of the casualties] while I am sitting safe".

Amid the carnage, Lieutenant Colonel Albert Caro, Major Ben Hearman and Lieutenant Colonel Cooper all protested to Dougherty that his tactics were at fault. They all were punished with transfers to backwaters. Cooper (shot in the hip at Gona) has recalled; "...they used to say there were two types of officers: those who were always going to reach the top, and then the others that are always at fault. But then there is the other type like Arnold Potts, who just get on with the job and do it superbly. They are efficient and successful and save men's lives while they go about it. But Arnold Potts wasn't at Gona.

Potts dealt with his difficulties by devoting himself to training his brigade. It was said that by the time they were committed to action, his 7th and 8th Battalions were better trained than any AIF battalion before them. In April 1943 Blamey inspected and was very impressed with the quality of the brigade. By this stage the Northern Territory Force GOC was "Tubby" Allen, also marking time in a relative backwater. Allen steered Potts away from controversy during Blamey's visit.

By March 1944, 23rd Brigade was still training, now in Queensland. Potts kept the pressure on his men, and it was not always welcome. Many of them had not been under fire, and could not relate the punishing fitness regime and battalion manoeuvres to actual combat, as he could. Allen had moved on and Potts' GOC was now Major General Stanley Savige. Savige hauled him over the coals for being too tough on his battalion commanders. Potts had long-term fears for the future, if the pressure on Japan was eased. He confided to Dawn; "I'm scared stiff we'll all go soft because of further casualties and not hammer the Jap flat. We lose them in this war and the next will be the kids".

In April at last the brigade was posted overseas, initially to Lae in New Guinea Territory, then to the Wau area. The brigade, now part of II Corps, continued training. Potts was much happier with his battalion commanding officers, but was able to write to Dawn; "I put over a pretty brutal talk to COs ... on matters of jealousies, viewpoints and lack of teamwork. Trod on corns all round and am not popular but that will pass."

=== Bougainville Campaign ===
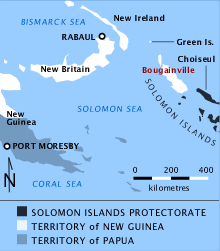
Bougainville's location relative to New Guinea

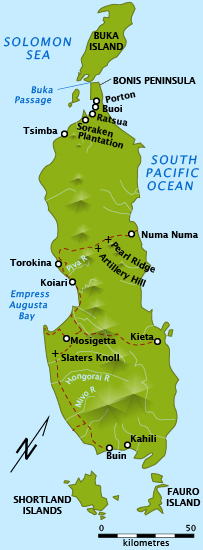
Some key locations in the campaign.

Finally II Corps was transferred to the Solomon Islands. The 23rd Brigade set up HQ in the Green Islands, north of Bougainville on 27 September 1944.

==== Green Islands ====
The battalions were spread out guarding airfields and naval installations on various neighbouring islands. Potts agitated for a more focused and aggressive role. He was aware that among his troops were men who had volunteered for overseas service four years previously. He also feared that a passive garrison role in the tropics would sap the fitness and discipline he had painstakingly instilled. Potts did his homework, and proposed to Savige a four-point plan of action for the Brigade:

- General reconnaissance against nearby enemy territory, followed by attacks to root out enemy remnants:
- on Choiseul (believed to harbour 300 Japanese)
- at the northern end of Bougainville (1,300)
- and on Buka Island (1,000)

Savige rejected the plans. His justification in the official war history provides a fair and reasonable portrait of Potts, as seen from above in the chain of command: "Potts was a very gallant man and looked for fights, but looking without planning the ways and means to land and support troops on hostile shores was another thing. Further, Potts always found it difficult to envisage or accommodate himself to the overall plan of his commander ... Potts was a character apart from the rest. His personal courage was unsurpassed and his genial nature drew one to him. However, his zeal to be on patrol or with the leading section denied him control of operations which led him to countenance fear of some disaster overtaking his troops".

Savige eventually realised the northern islands were so quiet, that the 23rd would be better deployed at Torokina in central Bougainville. This required MacArthur's approval, which took three months. The brigade passed the time enjoying the facilities that the American garrison troops had left behind, when they were transferred to more glamorous work re-conquering the Philippines. Potts went home on leave to Western Australia for nearly two months, rejoining the brigade at the end of January 1945. Shortly after he received a curt signal from II Corps HQ, asking why he had not nominated anyone for medals recently.

==== Central Bougainville ====
On 10 April Savige gave Potts control of the central Bougainville sector. He immediately sent out patrols to sniff out Japanese. This put him at odds with Major George Winning, a former commando who had surveyed the whole island when Australian troops first arrived. Winning called Bougainville "a self-supporting POW camp". "To fight a war here and provoke hostilities will be nothing more than sinful destruction and wastage of bloody fine men who deserve to be laid off and sent home to their people". In Potts' view, taking a brigade trained to the peak of fitness and primed to attack and then giving them a garrison job, was actually more hazardous than sending them into battle. He had already lost one battalion commander in Bougainville, not in combat but in a plane crash while on a reconnaissance flight.

Potts established that there was a force of 40–50 enemy in the Berry's Hill area, and had reason to believe they were being reinforced. With artillery support and air support from the Royal New Zealand Air Force, the Australians killed and captured a number of the Japanese and pushed their front line forward. Soon resistance stiffened, and it was clear that the hill was held by a significant force. As II Corps had introduced a "no casualties" policy, the Australians withdrew, with one slightly wounded. Patrolling and harassing without any serious engagements continued until June, when 23rd Brigade was sent north.

==== Northern Bougainville ====
Potts' new assignment was to contain Japanese troops in the narrow Bonis Peninsula and push them north towards the Buka Passage at the end. There was now believed to be 1,200 Japanese on the peninsula and 1,400 on Buka Island across the passage. By 28 June Potts had his 27th and 8th Battalions positioned at the base of the peninsula, on the east and west sides respectively. The Australian lines of communication were quite stretched, and the Japanese infiltrated constantly. In July an Australian wood-chopping party was attacked and two field ambulance men were killed. The next day a jeep was wrecked by a mine. 8th Battalion lost Captain Ogden to another mine and Lieutenant Webb, killed while leading an ambush patrol.

Following the failure of the landing at Porton Plantation the planned Australian advance into the Bonis Peninsula was called off. II Corps' focus now moved to the south, leaving Potts and 23rd Brigade to perform a holding role along the Ratsua front. While carrying this out, with Savige forbidding any forward motion, the brigade lost 7 killed and 17 wounded in patrols and ambushes, three killed and two wounded by friendly mortar fire, 12 wounded by their own booby traps and five in other accidents. During this phase Private Frank Partridge won his Victoria Cross for clearing a number of enemy bunkers despite being seriously wounded.

The Japanese were running low on ammunition and food. They rarely fired unless they had a good target. Potts recorded in his report that enemy morale was good, however "Food captured in the field kitchens consisted mainly of bamboo shoots, roots and vegetable matter generally. Evidence of cannibalism occurred on two occasions, flesh being cut from the calf and thigh of dead Japanese". As Bougainville was now a very low priority theatre, the Australians also suffered from supply problems. Inadequate shipping, artillery, ammunition and medical supplies hampered Potts' efforts. The 27 Battalion diary recorded on 1 July; "We've been promised tanks but they have yet to be sighted ... the water situation is also difficult. The L of C [line of command] ... is over 3000 yards long, 2500 yards of which cannot be covered, and consequently enables the Jap to ambush it just when he likes". However at least they were neither starving nor abandoned totally by their hierarchy, like the Japanese.

Despite these difficulties, Potts continued to conjure up attacking schemes. On 10 July he badgered Savige about an offensive in the Porton area of the Bonis Peninsula. Savige rejected this as completely contrary to their standing orders, and concluded from questioning him that Potts had actually not read them. In his opinion; "I think this is sufficient to understand Potts and the spirit within his Brigade. Had he lived to fight at Waterloo in a square, when the sole requirement was dogged bravery, he would have been a most successful commander. In modern warfare he was a lone wolf whose chief interest was to lead a patrol or wander along a track in his jeep or on foot." He linked this tendency to the Kokoda campaign. "Potts feels he must redeem his name after the events of the Kokoda Trail..." For his part, Potts had had enough of the static yet vulnerable role on the Ratsua front, and asked Savige to withdraw his brigade to a smaller front around Buoi. Following this a number of small scale actions continued along the front until offensive action was discontinued on 11 August, after the atomic bombs were dropped on Japan on 6 August and 9 August.

==== End game in Bougainville ====
Emperor Hirohito formally announced the end of hostilities in Tokyo on 15 August, but his loyal troops in the Solomons did not hear the news for some time. II Corps HQ at Torokina advised Australian commanders that it may take 8 days for the information to reach Japanese troops in Bougainville. Potts flew to Torokina for a briefing on the surrender. He was dismayed to realise that front-line troops would play no part in the surrender—"a poor reward to the troops for months of fighting". The Japanese commander, General Masatane Kanda, was kept waiting by his superiors in Rabaul for permission to surrender. Finally on 7 September, he and Vice-Admiral Tomoshige Samejima arrived at Torokina and formally surrendered to Savige.

Potts returned to 23rd Brigade at Soraken, where he learned he would be taking charge of all of Bougainville and neighbouring islands. Now it truly was a prisoner of war camp as suggested by Major Winning. There were 18,000 Japanese in the Fauro Island area, and camps at Torokina eventually held 8,000. Massive quantities of Japanese arms and ammunition were destroyed or dumped in the sea. Lieutenant Colonel Charles Court, on Savige's staff, arranged a parade of senior Japanese officers for Potts. He warned them, "This is one man on our side we haven't been able to convince the war is over". Potts, in full regalia, inspected the seventeen generals and fifteen admirals, all standing rigidly at attention despite tattered uniforms. Court had told him that the Japanese would be expecting fireworks. But at the end of his inspection, having returned to the front and faced his defeated enemy, Potts exclaimed "Good show!" and went along the line shaking hands. Later he said "Many dreadful things had been done during the course of the war – by both sides. There should not be recriminations after the event. Once it was over it was over".

Potts handed over command of the 23rd Brigade to Brigadier Noel Simpson on 4 December 1945. His farewell order to troops said; "The standard of efficiency as a Brigade and the fighting spirit of the troops will remain always as a vivid memory". The next day he flew home to Australia. For his service on Bougainville Potts was Mentioned in Despatches twice.

== Later life ==
Following the war, Potts returned to farming in Western Australia and briefly attempted to pursue a career in politics, standing unsuccessfully in 1949 as a Country Party candidate for the federal seat of Forrest in the House of Representatives. However, his preferences allowed Liberal challenger Gordon Freeth to defeat Labor minister Nelson Lemmon. Lemmon was well ahead on the first count, but Potts' preferences flowed overwhelmingly to Freeth on the third count, allowing Freeth to win from third place.

In 1960 Potts was appointed an Officer of the Order of the British Empire in the New Years Honours List. After several strokes, he became reliant on a wheelchair. He died on 1 January 1968 at Kojonup, aged 71.
