= Porton Barracks =

Australian Army Barracks

- Cairns, Queensland in Australia

Site information
- Type: Army barracks (1971–present)
- Owner: Department of Defence
- Operator: Australian Army (1971–present)

Location
- Location in Queensland
- Coordinates: 17°00′08″S 145°44′45″E

Porton Barracks is a military facility founded in 1971 in Edmonton, Cairns Region, Queensland, Australia. It is the home of the 51st Battalion, Far North Queensland Regiment.

Porton Barracks was named after the Battle of Porton Plantation. A battle during the Second World War that involved the 31st/51st Battalion, Royal Queensland Regiment.

== Current units ==
- 51st Battalion, Far North Queensland Regiment
- Delta Company, 31st/42nd Battalion, Royal Queensland Regiment
- 134 ACU (Army Cadet Unit)
