= Taiof Island =

- Interactive map of Taiof Island

Geography
- Coordinates: 5.525°S 154.654°E
- Archipelago: Solomon Islands
- Area: 23.065 km^{2} (8.905 sq mi)

Administration
- Papua New Guinea
- Kunua Rural LLG, North Solomons Province, Autonomous Region of Bougainville

Taiof Island, also known as Toiokh Island, is a small volcanic island off the north-western coast of Bougainville Island, in the Autonomous Region of Bougainville in eastern Papua New Guinea. It is part of the Solomon Islands Archipelago and falls within the Kunua Rural LLG in the North Solomons Province. Saposa language is spoken by the inhabitants on the island.

== History ==
During the Second World War, Taiof Island was occupied by the Empire of Japan in 1942. In early March 1944, the villagers loyal to the Allies ambushed the Japanese troops who attempted to escape from the island using native canoes to reach Tarlean on the northwest coast of Bougainville. After the war, it was part of Kieta District in the Northern Solomons in the territory of New Guinea. In 1975, it became part of the Bougainville Province in Papua New Guinea, which became an autonomous region in 2002.

== Geography ==
Taiof is a small volcanic island off the north-western coast of Bougainville Island, in the Autonomous Region of Bougainville in eastern Papua New Guinea. It is located in the north-eastern Solomon Islands Archipelago. It is located to the south of Sohano and Buka Islands, and north-west of Soraken. It falls within the Kunua Rural LLG in the North Solomons Province. The island occupies an area of 23.065 km^{2} (8.905 sq mi) and has a tropical rainforest climate with heavy rainfall, high humidity and hot temperatures year round.

It is located on the Banda Sea, a distinct plate in the eastern Indonesian region. Interactions of with the Australian and Pacific plates, gives rise to notable seismic and volcanic activity in the islands. The island has a mean elevation of 62 m (203 ft). The topography consists of flat coastal lowlands and plains in the interior with the highest elevation reaching 180 m (590 ft). The island has a significant tree cover (87% of land area) with evergreen forests dominating the ecosystem.

== Demographics and economy ==
The Saposa language is spoken by the island's inhabitants. In 1998, there were 1400 residents recorded in the island. Cruise ships bring tourists to the island.
