= Eikichi =

- Gender: Male

Origin
- Origin: Japanese
- Meaning: Different meanings depending on the kanji used

Eikichi (written: 永吉, 栄吉 or 榮吉) is a masculine Japanese given name. Notable people with the name include:

- Eikichi Araki (新木 栄吉; 1891–1959), Japanese businessman and banker
- Eikichi Kato (加藤 榮吉; 1897–1946), Imperial Japanese Navy officer
- Sōkokurai Eikichi (蒼国来 栄吉; born 1984), Chinese sumo wrestler
- Eikichi Yazawa (矢沢 永吉; born 1949), Japanese singer-songwriter

== Fictional Characters ==
- Eikichi Onizuka (鬼塚 英吉), protagonist of the manga and anime series Great Teacher Onizuka
- Eikichi Mishina (三科栄吉), character from the videogame Persona 2: Innocent Sin
- Eikichi (エイキチ), protagonist’s cat from the series Yu Yu Hakusho
