= Bonis Airfield =

Airport in Bougainville, Papua New Guinea

- IATA: none; ICAO: none

Summary
- Owner/Operator: Imperial Japanese Navy Air Service
- Location: Bonis Peninsula, Bougainville Island, Papua New Guinea
- Built: July 1943
- In use: 1943-1945
- Coordinates: 5°26′19″S 154°41′16″E
- Interactive map of Bonis Airfield

Bonis Airfield was an aerodrome located on the Bonis Peninsula, Bougainville Island, Papua New Guinea. It was located south of the Buka Passage and Buka Airfield. The airfield was constructed by the Imperial Japanese Navy during World War II in July 1943 as an auxiliary landing strip for Buka Airfield. The airfield was abandoned after the cessation of hostilities.
