= Eikichi Kato =

Japanese officer, war criminal 1897–1946

- 加藤 榮吉
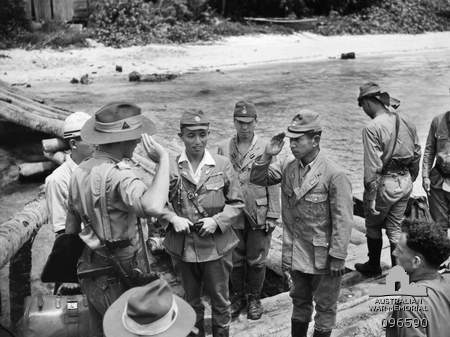
- Kato, along with other officers, surrender on North Bougainville
- Born: January 10, 1897; Empire of Japan
- Died: August 1, 1946 (aged 49); Rabaul, Papua New Guinea
- Cause of death: Execution by hanging
- Military career
- Allegiance: Empire of Japan
- Branch: Imperial Japanese Navy
- Rank: Captain
- Conflicts: World War II; Pacific War; Battle of Porton Plantation

Captain Eikichi Kato (加藤 榮吉, Katō Eikichi; January 10, 1897 – August 1, 1946) was a senior officer in the Imperial Japanese Navy during World War II. Kato was the senior officer of the Imperial Japanese Navy forces on the Bonis Peninsula and Buka Island during the latter stages of World War II.

Lieutenant Kawanishi Shotaro was appointed by Captain Kato as the envoy to meet Australian officers on 14 September 1945 off Soraken Peninsula, to discuss the surrender of the Imperial Japanese Navy forces on the Bonis Peninsula and Buka Island.

Captain Kato was charged of the murder of seven civilian inhabitants of North Bougainville between September 1943 and October 1945, where he pleaded not guilty.

After the war, Kato was convicted of war crimes by an Australian military court and executed by hanging in Rabaul in 1946.

== Notes ==
Citations
