= Genga River =

River on Bougainville Island, Papua New Guinea

Coordinates: 5°39′S 154°43′E

The Genga River is a river on Bougainville Island, located within the Autonomous Region of Bougainville, in northeastern Papua New Guinea.

The river flows into the Solomon Sea on the western side of Bougainville Island.

During the Second World War, Australian troops occupied the area south of the Genga River on the western coast of Bougainville Island.
