= Frank Partridge (soldier) =

Recipient of the Victoria Cross

Frank John Partridge VC
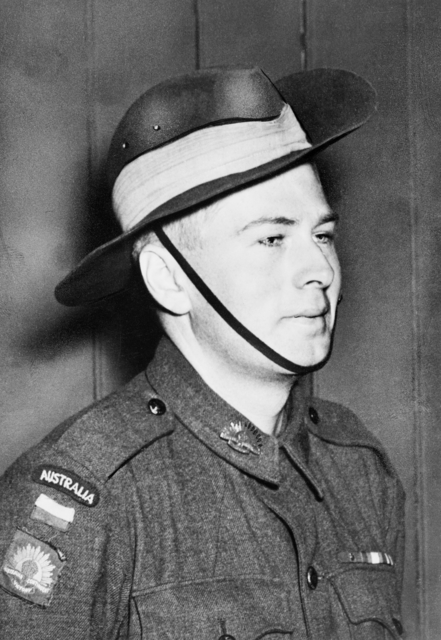
- Private Frank Partridge in August 1946
- Born: 29 November 1924; Grafton, New South Wales
- Died: 23 March 1964 (aged 39); Macksville, New South Wales
- Military career
- Allegiance: Australia
- Branch: Australian Army
- Service years: 1942–1946
- Rank: Private
- Service number: N454409
- Units: 8th Battalion
- Conflicts: Second World War; Bougainville Campaign
- Awards: Victoria Cross
- Other work: Farmer; Quiz show champion

Frank John Partridge, VC (29 November 1924 – 23 March 1964) was an Australian soldier, farmer, quiz show champion, and a recipient of the Victoria Cross, the highest decoration for gallantry "in the face of the enemy" awarded to members of the British and Commonwealth armed forces. He was decorated for his actions on Bougainville in July 1945, when he attacked two Japanese bunkers despite severe wounds. Partridge was the last and, at 20 years of age, the youngest Australian awarded the Victoria Cross in the Second World War. He later became a farmer and a television quiz champion, and unsuccessfully ran for political office shortly before his death in a car accident.

== Early life ==
Frank John Partridge was born at Grafton, New South Wales, on 29 November 1924, to farmer Patrick James Partridge and his English-born wife Mary (née Saggs). Partridge was educated at Tewinga Public School until he left at 13 to work on the family's dairy and banana farm at Upper Newee Creek, near Macksville.

== Second World War ==
In December 1942, during World War II, Partridge was conscripted by the Australian Army. He served as a private in the 8th Battalion, a Militia unit formed in Victoria. In May 1944, the 8th Battalion was posted to New Guinea.

In June 1945, the 8th Battalion was transferred to the Bougainville campaign, where it operated to contain Japanese forces on the Bonis Peninsula. It was here that Partridge performed a deed for which he received the Victoria Cross (VC), the highest award for gallantry that could be awarded to British Commonwealth forces.

On 24 July, in one of the last actions of the campaign on Bougainville, two platoons of the 8th Battalion attacked a Japanese post, Base 5, near Ratsua. Partridge's section came under heavy machine-gun fire and suffered severe casualties, including a Bren gunner who was killed. Although wounded in the arm and leg, Partridge retrieved the Bren gun and began shooting at the nearest bunker while under fire himself. He then rushed forward armed with a grenade and a knife, silenced the Japanese machine-gun with his grenade, and killed the only living occupant of the bunker with his knife. Partridge attacked the second until loss of blood compelled him to halt. Later he re-joined the fight and remained in action while the platoon withdrew.

Partridge was the last and the youngest Australian to be awarded the Victoria Cross in World War II. He was also the first Australian Militiaman to receive the award.

== Later life ==
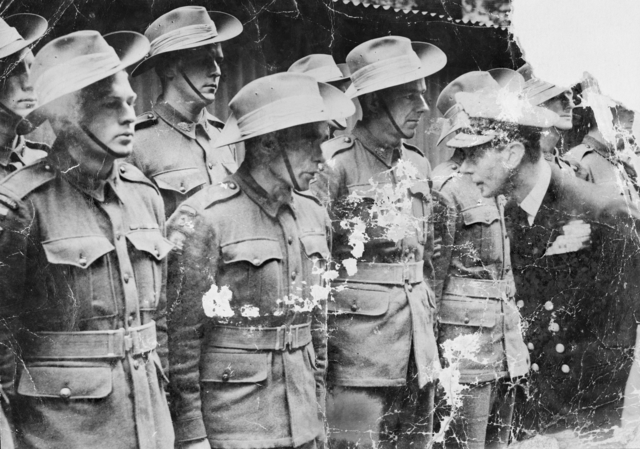
Partridge (1st left) meets King George VI at Victory Parade, June 1946

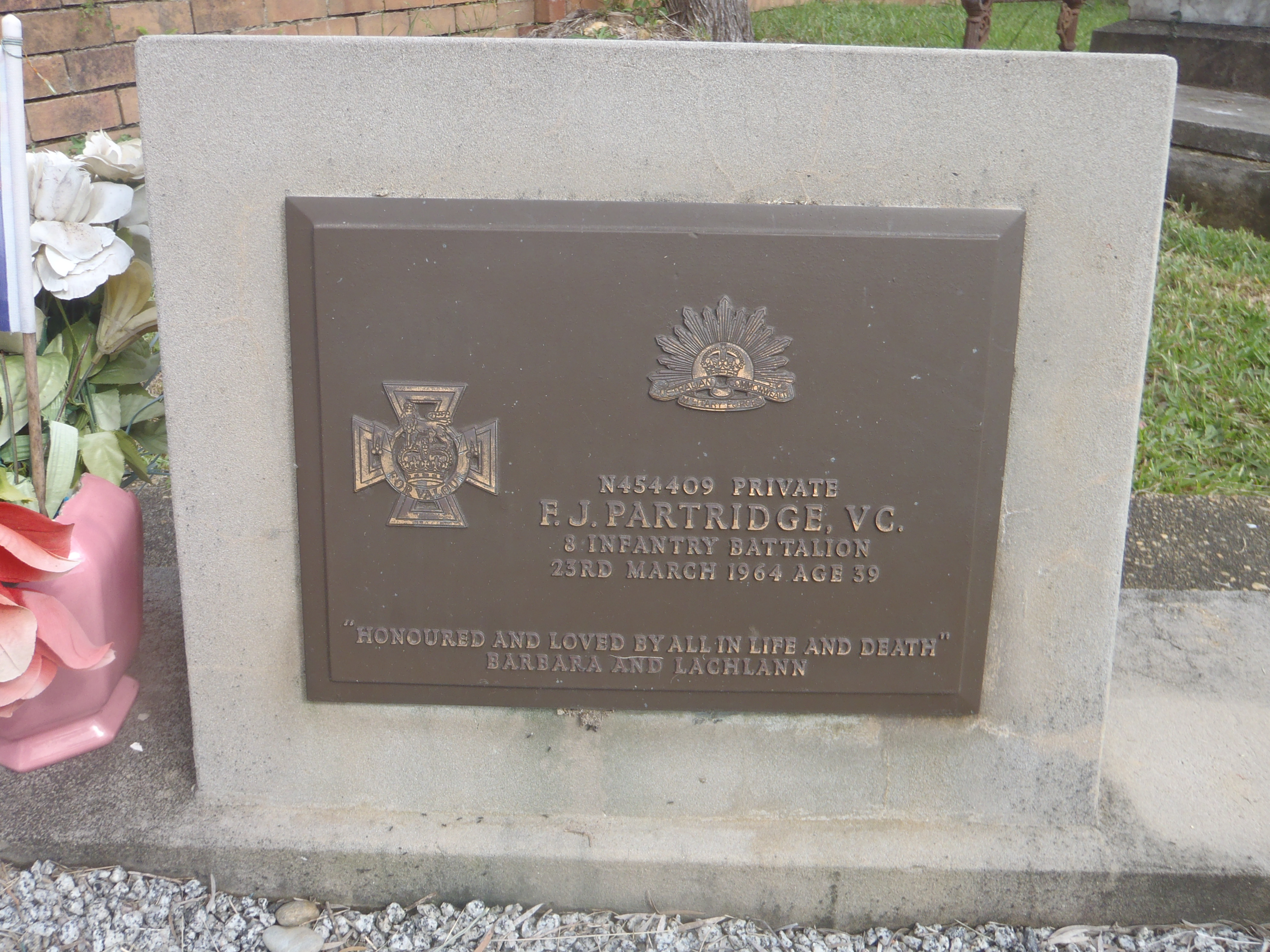
Partridge's grave marker

Discharged from the army in October 1946, Partridge returned to the family farm. He lived with his father in a dirt-floored farmhouse, and in his spare time devoted himself to self-education, reading Encyclopædia Britannica by the light of a kerosene lamp. He had an extraordinarily retentive memory and in 1962–63 he appeared as a contestant on the television quiz show, Pick a Box, compered by Bob Dyer, alongside contestants such as Barry Jones. His laconic manner appealed strongly to viewers. Partridge was one of only three contestants to win all forty boxes and his prizes were valued at more than £12,000 (in excess of A$250,000 in present-day terms).

He married Barbara Dunlop, a 31-year-old nurse from Turramurra in Sydney, in February 1963. The wedding received extensive media coverage. She remained in Sydney while Partridge built a new house at the farm. He drove to Sydney every weekend to see her. Later in 1963, Partridge sought Country Party pre-selection for the Australian House of Representatives seat of Cowper. His political views were widely regarded as extreme, and he was not selected. To supplement the income from his farm, Partridge also sold life insurance.

Partridge was killed in a car accident in 1964, and was buried with full military honours in Macksville Cemetery. His wife and three-month-old son survived him.

In 1989 a primary school at Nambucca Heads was named the Frank Partridge VC Public School.

The Frank Partridge VC Rest Area on the southbound lane of the Hume Highway, some kilometres south of Sydney, is named after him.
