= 81st Infantry Regiment (Imperial Japanese Army) =

The 81st Infantry Regiment was an infantry regiment in the Imperial Japanese Army. The regiment was attached to the 17th Infantry Brigade of the 17th Division and participated during the Second Sino-Japanese War. The regiment fought in the later stages of World War II, assigned to the Japanese 8th Area Army at Bougainville Island in the Solomon Islands.

== Organization ==
- 1st Battalion
- 2nd Battalion
- 3rd Battalion
