= Tarlena =

Village in Bougainville, Papua New Guinea

Tarlena is a village on the north-west coast of Bougainville Island, in the Autonomous Region of Bougainville of Papua New Guinea.

The Bishop Wade Secondary School is located at the village.
