= Kunua Rural LLG =

Local-level government in Papua New Guinea

- Country: Papua New Guinea
- Province: Autonomous Region of Bougainville
- District: North Bougainville District

Population (2011 census)
  - Total: 13,525
- Time zone: UTC+10 (AEST)

Kunua Rural LLG is a local-level government (LLG) of the Autonomous Region of Bougainville, Papua New Guinea.
