= 8th Battalion (Australia) =

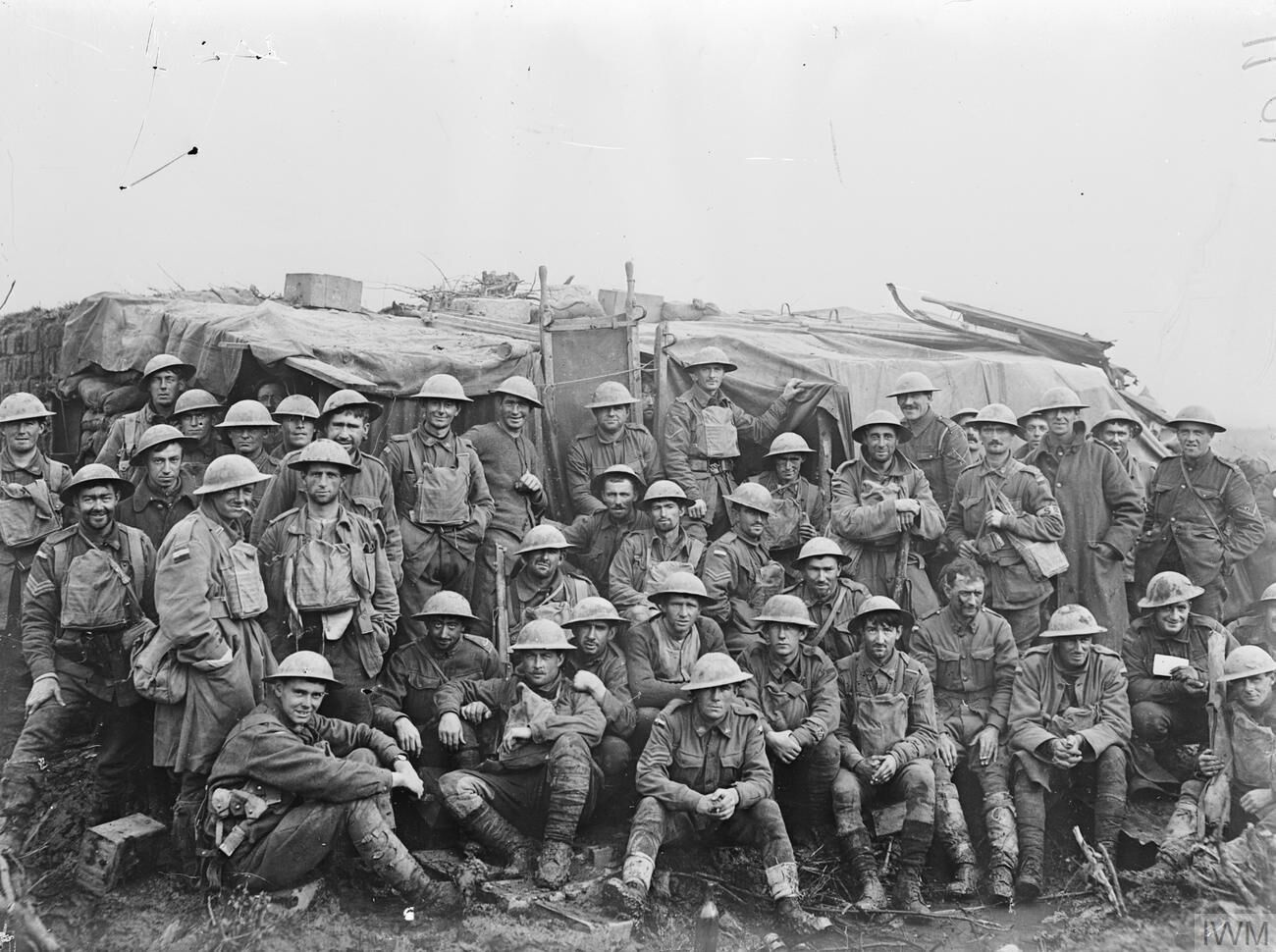
- Members of the 8th Battalion, after attacking at Passchendaele, 28 October 1917
- Active: 1914–1919; 1921–1946
- Country: Australia
- Branch: Australian Army
- Type: Infantry
- Role: Line infantry
- Size: ~800–1,000 men
- Part of: 2nd Brigade (1914–19); 23rd Brigade (1941–46)
- Colours: White over red
- Engagements: First World War: Gallipoli campaign; Western Front; Second World War: Bougainville campaign

Insignia
- Unit colour patch

The 8th Battalion was an infantry battalion of the Australian Army. Initially raised in 1914 for the First Australian Imperial Force during the First World War the battalion was completely recruited from Victoria and formed part of the 2nd Brigade, 1st Division. During the war it fought at Gallipoli and in France and Belgium on the Western Front. It was disbanded in 1919, before being re-raised as a Militia battalion in 1921. During the Second World War the 8th Battalion was used primarily as a garrison unit before taking part in the Bougainville campaign late in the war. It was disbanded again in 1946 during the demobilisation process, although it was reformed again in 1948 when it was amalgamated with the 7th Battalion. Today, its honours and traditions are perpetuated by the 8th/7th Battalion, Royal Victoria Regiment.

== History ==
=== First World War ===
The 8th Battalion was raised within two weeks of the start of the First World War. The majority of its personnel were drawn from volunteers for overseas service from rural Victoria and after undertaking rudimentary training the battalion, attached to the 2nd Brigade, departed Australia two months later, heading for Egypt. The Australians arrived in Egypt on 2 December 1914 and following this they undertook further training and briefly taking part in the defence of the Suez Canal from the Turks following the First Suez Offensive. The Turkish offensive ended before the battalion could see any action. Following this, the battalion remained in Egypt before being transported to Lemnos Island in early April in preparation for their involvement in the Gallipoli campaign. Under the command of Lieutenant Colonel William Kinsey Bolton, they took part in the Landing at Anzac Cove, coming ashore as part of the second wave on 25 April 1915.

Private David Mills gave this eye-witness account of the landing:

Landing under fire like some monster fireworks. The battleships sending their Jack Johnsons roaring into the enemy. Shells are screaming everywhere. "Lizzie" is tearing the very earth to shreds. I have kissed dear little Nan’s photo goodbye. "May God have mercy on my soul" and care for them I have left behind. What a Sunday.

This is his last diary entry, he was killed during the landing.

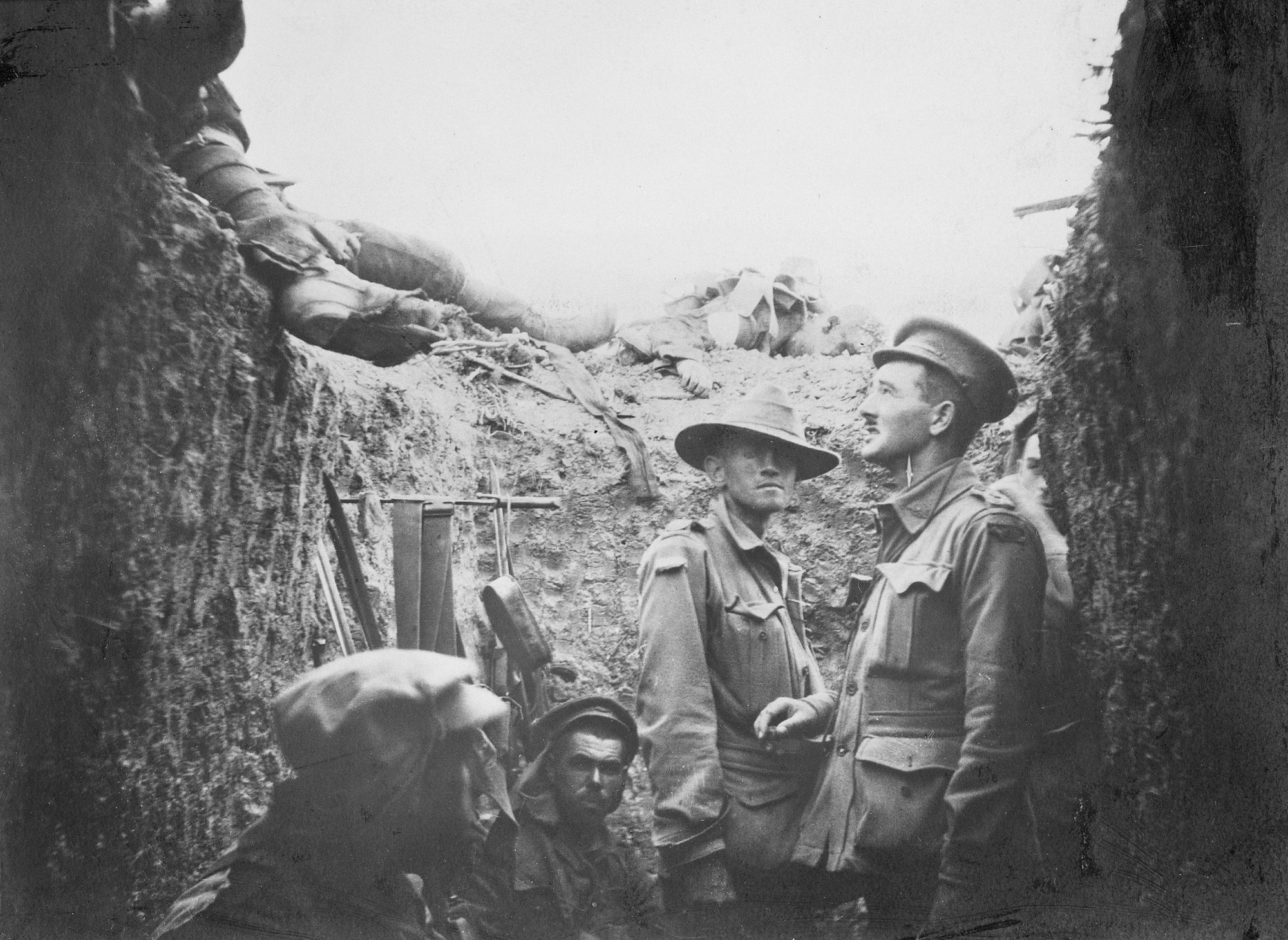
Members of the 2nd and 8th Battalions at Lone Pine, 1915

Ten days after the initial landing at Anzac Cove, the 2nd Brigade was transferred from Anzac Cove to Cape Helles to assist in the British and French attack on Krithia, where they carried out a largely unsuccessful assault before being brought back to the Australian lodgement at Anzac. In August, the battalion took part in the attack on Lone Pine, as the Allies attempted to break the stalemate that had developed on the peninsula. The August Offensive proved unsuccessful, however, and for the remainder of the campaign the 8th Battalion carried out mainly defensive duties before being evacuated along with the rest of the Anzac force in December 1915.

After the withdrawal from Gallipoli, the battalion returned to Egypt where the Australian Imperial Force underwent a period of re-organisation and expansion in preparation for deployment to the Western Front. As a part of this re-organisation, the AIF was expanded and the 8th Battalion provided a cadre of experienced staff to form the 60th Battalion. In March 1916, the 8th Battalion embarked for France and after arriving there shortly afterwards, it took up a position in the trenches on the Somme battlefield. The battalion's first major action in France came at Pozières in July 1916, during which Private Thomas Cooke performed the actions for which he was later posthumously awarded the Victoria Cross. Later the battalion fought at Ypres, in Belgium, before returning to the Somme in winter. Throughout 1917 they took part in operations against the Hindenburg Line, before being involved in the Third Battle of Ypres.

Following the launch of the German spring offensive in March and April 1918, the 8th Battalion took part in defensive operations, before participating in the Battle of Amiens, as the Allies launched their own counter offensive on 8 August 1918; an offensive that ultimately brought about an end to the war. During the attack near Amiens, one of the battalion's subalterns, Lieutenant William Joynt, took command when his company commander was killed and led the company in a bayonet charge that resulted in the capture of 80 prisoners of war. For this feat, he was subsequently awarded a Victoria Cross. The next day, Private Robert Matthew Beatham also earned a Victoria Cross by rushing five separate machine gun positions.

The battalion continued operations until late September 1918, when, suffering severe manpower shortages, the Australian Corps was withdrawn from the line for rest and re-organisation. They were subsequently out of the line when the Armistice was signed on 11 November 1918 and the war came to an end. Shortly afterwards the demobilisation process began and members from the battalion were gradually repatriated to Australia, while others were sent to England and France to undertake training to provide them with skills for civilian life following discharge. By April 1919 the battalion's numbers had been reduced to the extent that they were amalgamated with 5th Battalion. This battalion was subsequently amalgamated with another, formed from the 6th and 7th Battalions, to form the 2nd Brigade Battalion, before finally being disbanded. Throughout the course of the war, the 8th Battalion suffered 877 killed and 2,410 wounded. Its members received the following decorations: three Victoria Crosses, 10 Distinguished Service Orders and one Bar, 33 Military Crosses and six Bars, 43 Distinguished Conduct Medals, 32 Military Medals and one Bar, four MSMs, 45 Mentions in Despatches and nine foreign awards.

=== Inter war years and the Second World War ===
Later, in 1921, the 8th Battalion was re-raised as a Militia unit in Victoria, adopting the AIF unit's colour patch and taking custody of its battle honours. At this time it was assigned to the 6th Brigade, which formed part of the 4th Division. Upon re-formation, the battalion drew personnel from three previously existing part-time units: the 8th Infantry Regiment, the 39th Infantry Regiment and 6th Field Ambulance. Through these units, the 8th Battalion inherited the "South Africa 1899–1902" battle honour. In 1927, territorial titles were adopted and the battalion took on the designation of 8th Battalion (City of Ballarat Regiment). During this time the battalion had companies in Ararat, Stawell, and Daylesford, although its headquarters was established in Ballarat, Victoria.

At the outbreak of the Second World War, the 8th Battalion undertook a period of continuous training in 1939 and then again in 1940 as part of the general plan to increase the readiness of Australia's home defences. At this time it was assigned to the 6th Brigade along with the 7th and 38th Battalions. Following Japan's entry into the war in December 1941 the battalion was moved to Darwin where it was transferred to the 23rd Brigade, which had been previously made up of units of the Second Australian Imperial Force but which had largely been destroyed in Malaya and subsequently reformed as a Militia formation consisting of the 7th, 8th and 27th Battalions. The 8th remained in Darwin on defensive duties until September 1943 when its personnel were given a months leave in Melbourne before moving to the Atherton Tablelands in Queensland for training prior to deployment overseas. In May 1944, they moved to Lae, where they remained until October 1944 when the 23rd Brigade relieved the American forces garrisoning the Outer Islands. During this time the 8th Battalion were stationed on Emirau Island, where a number of its personnel crewed United States Navy PT boats and took part in raiding operations around New Britain and New Ireland.

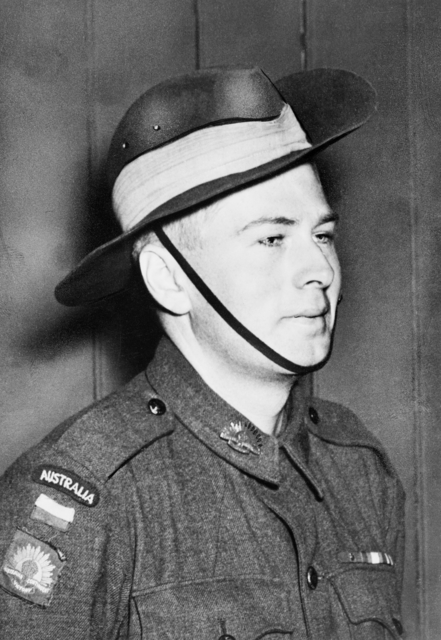
Frank Partridge, who received the Victoria Cross for actions on Bougainville in 1945

In 1945, the battalion finally received its chance to take part in the fighting against the Japanese when they were moved from the Outer Islands to Soraken and took part in the final phases on the Bougainville campaign. During the fighting that it took part in during late July around Ratsua, one of the 8th Battalion's members, Private Frank John Partridge carried out the deeds for which he was later awarded the Victoria Cross. Partridge's award was the first such award made to an Australian soldier serving in the Militia. This battalion was disbanded on 2 May 1946. It suffered 49 casualties during its active service on Bougainville, of which 19 were killed. Its members received the following decorations: one Victoria Cross, two Military Medals, and eight Mentions in Despatches.

=== Post Second World War ===
In 1948, the 8th Battalion was re-raised as part of the reconstituted Citizen Military Force. At this time the 8th and 7th Battalions were amalgamated to form the 8th/7th Battalion, the North Western Victorian Regiment. Today this unit is known as the 8th/7th Battalion, Royal Victoria Regiment (8/7 RVR), a unit of the Australian Army Reserve, and it serves as the custodian of 8th Battalion's battle honours and traditions.

== Battle honours ==
The 8th Battalion received the following battle honours:

- "South Africa 1899–1902" (inherited);
- First World War: Somme 1916, Somme 1918, Pozieres, Bullecourt, Ypres 1917, Menin Road, Polygon Wood, Broodseinde, Poelcappelle, Passchendaele, Lys, Hazebrouck, Amiens, Albert 1918, Hindenburg Line, Hindenburg Line, Epehy, France and Flanders 1916–1918, Helles, Krithia, ANZAC, Landing at ANZAC, Defence at ANZAC, Suvla;
- Second World War: South-West Pacific 1944–45, Liberation of Australian New Guinea.
