= Buka Passage =

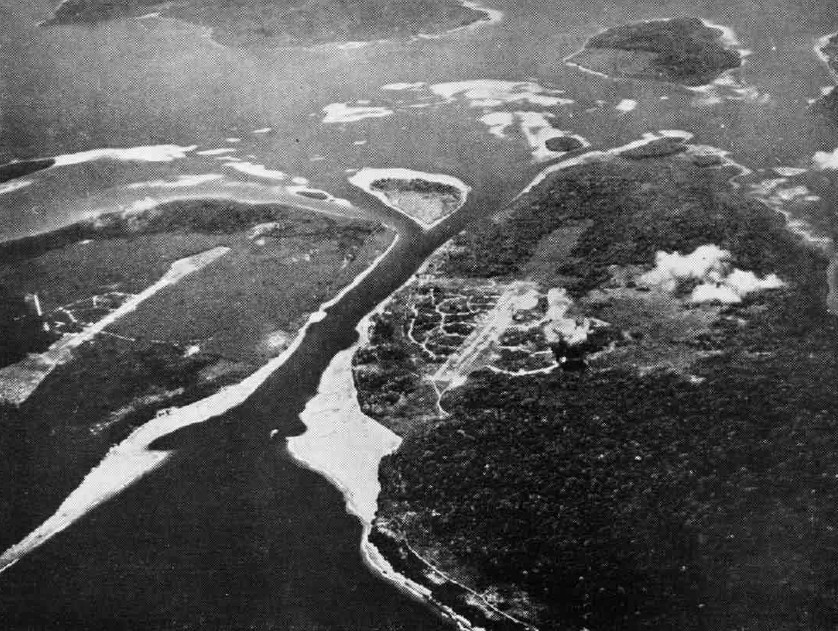
- A 1943 aerial photograph of the strait between Bougainville Island (left) and Buka Island (right)
- Interactive map of Buka Passage
- Location: Autonomous Region of Bougainville
- Coordinates: 5.432°S 154.675°E
- Type: Strait
- Max. width: 200 metres (660 ft)
- Settlements: Buka

Buka Passage is a narrow strait that separates Buka Island from the northern part of Bougainville Island, within the Autonomous Region of Bougainville of northeastern Papua New Guinea.

== History ==
Humans have lived on Buka for at least 28,000 years. Discovered by Europeans in 1768, the German Empire laid claim to the island in 1899, annexing it into German New Guinea.

In 1914, the region was seized by Australian troops amidst World War I. Starting from 1914, Buka Passage, as with the rest of Papua New Guinea, was ruled by Australia as the Territory of Papua. The Australian administration built Buka Airfield.

Before World War II, Irish missionary Patrick O'Reilly joined a religious mission to Buka Passage, and began collecting artefacts that helped to preserve Bougainville cultural history.

During World War II, the region was occupied by the Empire of Japan. On the onset of the Japanese invasion, in 1942, the previous Australian occupation made preparations to destroy the airfields in the region. However, they had to flee before they could go through with it.

The Japanese occupation built Bonis Airfield, starting in early 1943 and finishing in October of that year. The strait was also used for seaplane landings.

Between 10 November 1943 and 10 June 1944, Buka Passage was attacked by the Allies 18 times.

Between 14 and 16 September 1945, Australian and Japanese forces negotiated a Japanese surrender, which was formally announced on the 16th.

Following the war, a number of shipwrecks are located in the passage.

Today, Buka Airfield has become Bougainville's major airport, whereas Bonis Airfield has been disused since World War II. Some old wreckage from World War II is still displayed near the airport.

In the modern day, Buka Passage is used by local boats transporting passengers and cargo between the islands of Buka and Bougainville. There is also a wharf used by larger ships.

== Geography ==
Buka Passage ranges from as small as 200 metres (660 ft) wide to as large as 1,070 metres (3,510 ft). It has fast-moving currents. The current varies between one and three knots.

Both Buka Island and Bougainville Island are volcanic islands.

== See also ==
- Geography of the Autonomous Region of Bougainville
