= Bonis Peninsula =

Peninsula on Bougainville Island, Papua New Guinea

Geography
- Location: Bougainville Island
- Coordinates: 5.45°S 154.72°E

The Bonis Peninsula is a narrow peninsula located on Bougainville Island, Papua New Guinea, at the north of the island. The Buka Passage separates the peninsula from Buka Island.

== History ==
=== 20th century ===
In the first half of the 20th century, the peninsula had an established coconut palm plantation to harvest copra. During the Second World War, the peninsula was occupied by forces of Imperial Japan. In 1943, the Imperial Japanese Navy had Bonis Airfield constructed to serve as an auxiliary landing strip for Buka Airfield. The airfields' proximity to one another allowed for a shared anti-aircraft defense. Though the peninsula was hit by Allied bombing runs and strafing attempts during the period of 1943–1944, it remained occupied by Japanese forces until September, 1945 and the cessation of hostilities.
