= Soraken =

Village in Bougainville, Papua New Guinea

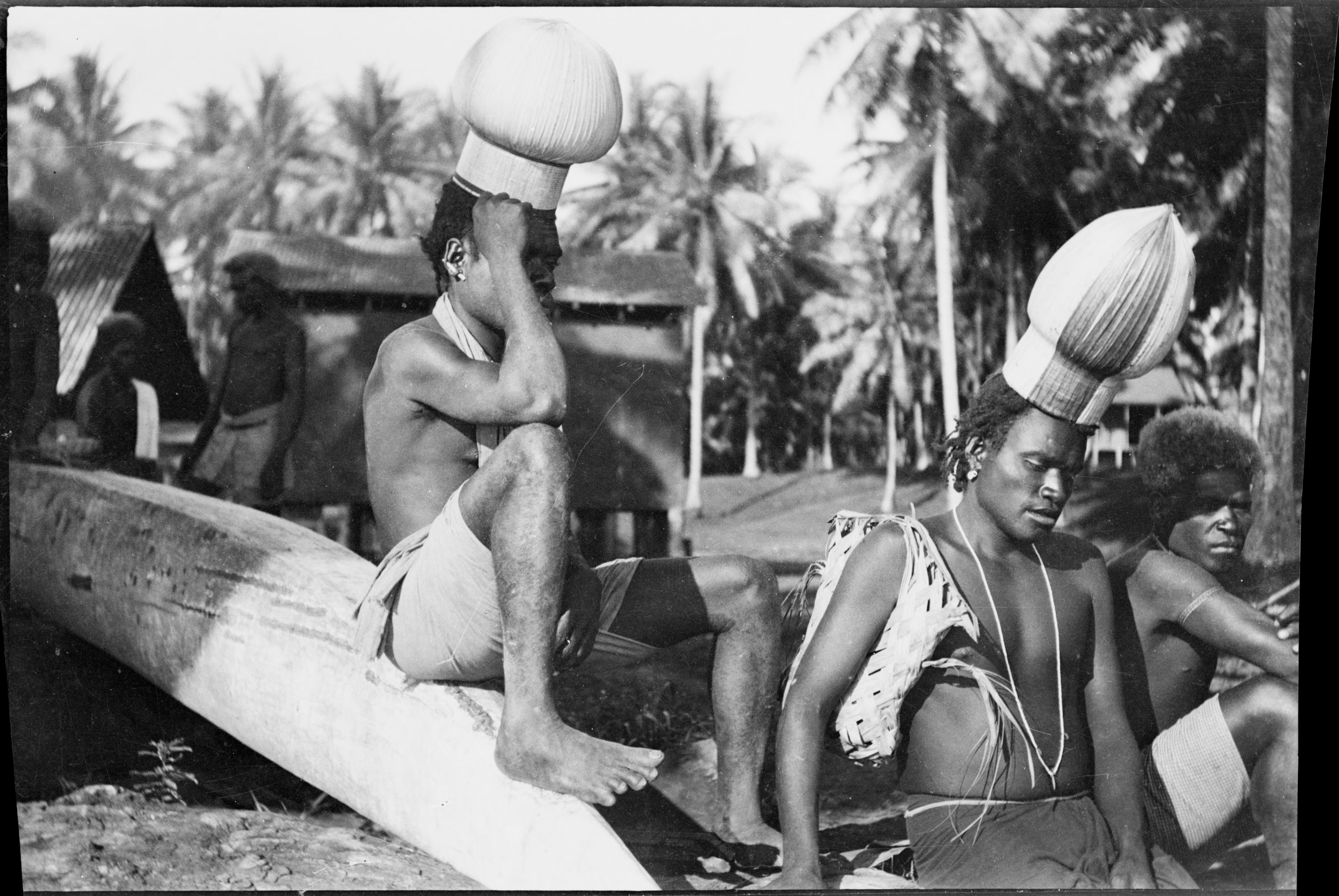
Men of Soraken wearing ceremonial initiation hats, c. 1929

Soraken is a village on the Soraken Peninsula in Bouganville, an island of Papua New Guinea. In January 1913, a copra plantation and a railway system 21 kilometres (13 mi) in length was created by Choiseul Plantations near the site, since in a state of disrepair. The village suffered damage during the Bougainville Civil War.

During World War II, the village was occupied by the Japanese in 1942 and liberated in 1945, when the Australian 11th Brigade pushed north to take the Soraken Peninsula.
