= Buka Rural LLG =

Local-level government in Papua New Guinea

- Country: Papua New Guinea
- Province: Autonomous Region of Bougainville
- District: North Bougainville District

Population (2011 census)
  - Total: 53,986
- Time zone: UTC+10 (AEST)

Buka Rural LLG is a local-level government (LLG) of comprising Buka Island in the Autonomous Region of Bougainville, Papua New Guinea. Several Northwest Solomonic languages are spoken in the LLG.

== Wards ==
- 02. Tsitalato
- 03. Hagogohe
- 04. Peit
- 05. Halia
- 06. Haku
- 07. Tonsu
- 80. Buka Urban

== See also ==
- Buka, Papua New Guinea
- Buka Airport
- Buka Island mosaic-tailed rat
- Buka Island solomys
- Buka Passage
- Invasion of Buka and Bougainville
- Hahalis Welfare Society
- Kilu Cave
- Our Lady of the Assumption Cathedral, Buka
