= Moses Havini =

Political activist

- Born: c. 5 June 1947; Buka Island, Territory of New Guinea
- Died: 2 May 2015 (aged 67); Sydney, Australia
- Education: University of Papua New Guinea
- Spouse: Marilyn Miller (m. 1971)

Moses Havini (c. 5 June 1947 – 2 May 2015) was a political activist from Buka Island in Papua New Guinea. He was a prominent campaigner for the independence of Bougainville from Papua New Guinea, beginning in the early 1970s. He was one of the designers of the flag of Bougainville. During the Bougainville Civil War he served as the official spokesman of the Bougainville Interim Government and Bougainville Revolutionary Army.

== Early life ==
Havini was born on Buka Island, which was then part of the Australian-administered Territory of New Guinea. He spoke the Hakö language and was connected with the Naboin and Nakas clans of Buka Island; his father was paramount chief of the Naboin clan. His official birthdate was 5 June 1947, however he later stated "I don't really know if this is my birthday [...] the local missionary just turned up one day and declared I was born on the 5th of June".

Havini graduated Bachelor of Arts from the University of Papua New Guinea in 1972, as one of the first students from Bougainville to obtain a university degree. He was the editor of the student newspaper, as well as a columnist for the Papua New Guinea Post-Courier. After graduating, Havini was employed as an adult education officer and helped establish literacy courses and facilitate correspondence studies for Bougainville residents. He successfully lobbied Papua New Guinean education minister Ebia Olewale to establish a school for members of the Hahalis Welfare Society. In 1975, Havini was one of five Papua New Guineans invited to study in the United States through the U. S. State Department's International Visitor Program. As an executive officer of the Bougainville provincial government, he was involved in development initiatives, such as the establishment of a fishing industry in the outlying Green, Carteret, Takuu, Nukumanu and Nuguria islands.

== Campaign for independence ==
=== Early years ===
Havini became active in politics as a university student. In 1969, following instances of police violence against protesters at the Bougainville Copper Mine, he publicly described the Australian administration on Bougainville as "totalitarian" and accused it of using a "Gestapo approach" to the issue of compulsory acquisition of land for the mine. Havini was a leader of Napidakoe Navitu, one of the first Bougainville secessionist movements. In 1970 he and Leo Hannett helped organise an informal referendum on independence, with around 90 percent voting in favour on a turnout of 17,000 people. Napidakoe Navitu subsequently petitioned PNG administrator David Hay to organise an official referendum on secession.

By 1973, Havini had been chosen as chairman of the Bougainville Constituency Assembly, an advisory body to the central administration on government policy. He and his father Jonathan designed the flag of Bougainville, with the first design produced by his wife Marilyn. In 1975, following the unilateral declaration of independence of the Republic of the North Solomons, Havini was named as a member of the executive of the interim government, serving as an assistant to chief secretary Alexis Sarei. He was subsequently served a notice of eviction from his house by the newly independent Papua New Guinean central government. In January 1976, while protesting in the village of Hutjena, he was shot in the back by rubber bullets fired by the Royal Papua New Guinea Constabulary, an injury which took nearly a year to recover from and left him with a large scar.

In August 1980, Havini was elected speaker of the provincial assembly of North Solomons, although he was not a member of the assembly itself. He had previously served as clerk of the assembly and its interim predecessor for seven years. He served as speaker until 1985.

=== Civil war and exile ===
Havini and his family moved to Australia in 1990, following the escalation of violence in the Bougainville Civil War. In the same year he was appointed as the official overseas representative of the Bougainville Interim Government (BIG), a position he would hold for the next 15 years. He was also the official spokesman of the Bougainville Revolutionary Army. In Australia, he helped establish the Bougainville Freedom Movement in support of Bougainvillean independence.

Havini attended the 1991 Commonwealth Heads of Government Meeting in Zimbabwe to lobby for an end to Papua New Guinea's blockade of Bougainville. He also attempted to attend a meeting of the South Pacific Forum in Nauru in 1993, but was refused entry by the Nauruan government. The PNG government unsuccessfully sought his extradition from Australia on charges of terrorism.

=== Return to Bougainville ===
Havini was involved in negotiating the Bougainville Peace Agreement of 1998, which led to the establishment of the Autonomous Bougainville Government (ABG). He and his family moved back to Buka Island in 2005, where he served as an advisor to the ABG on parliamentary processes. He was diagnosed with multiple myeloma in 2013 and died in Sydney on 2 May 2015.

== Personal life ==
In July 1971, Havini married Marilyn Miller, an Australian women he had met while attending a Christian students' conference in Melbourne. The couple had four children together.
