= Francis Hagai =

Former leader of Hahalis Welfare Society

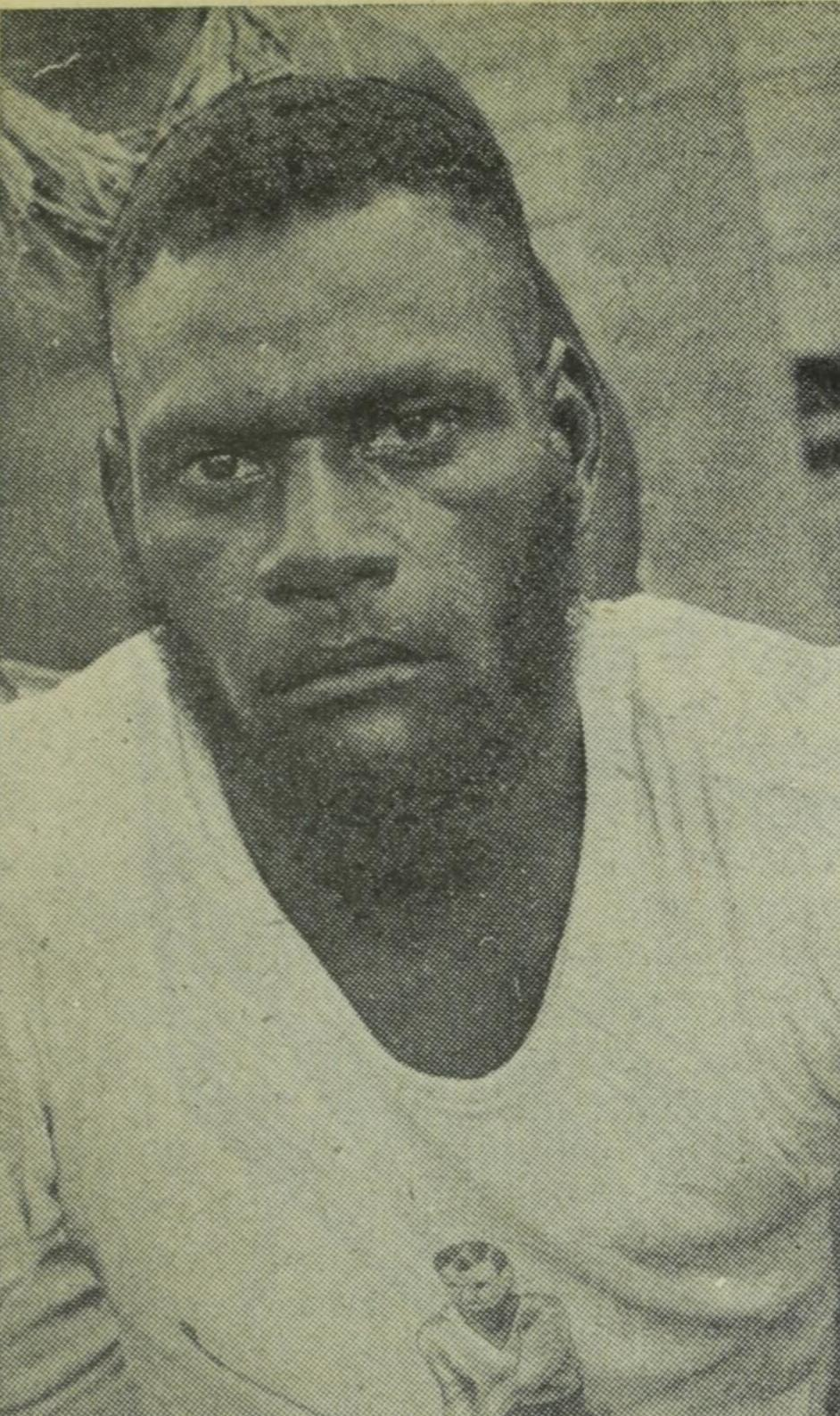
Hagai c. 1963

Francis Hagai (c. 1940 – 7 July 1974) was the leader of the Hahalis Welfare Society (HWS) on Buka Island, in what is now the Autonomous Region of Bougainville in Papua New Guinea. He received a Catholic education but later sought to establish an alternative church and revive traditional customs. In 1962 he led the HWS in a conflict with Australian authorities over a tax dispute and was briefly jailed. Although he was unsuccessful in bids for public office, he has been credited with drawing greater attention to Buka.

== Early life ==
Hagai was born in about 1940 in the Hahalis district of Buka Island, within the Australian-administered Territory of New Guinea. In the absence of any government schools on the island, he received a Catholic education at St Joseph's College in Rigu, near Kieta on Bougainville Island, and later trained as a teacher for one year. He also was a trained catechist. However, according to the Australian Dictionary of Biography he later "became contemptuous of the Church's failure to provide utilitarian education" and "apostatized after allegedly being shamed publicly by a confessor for a sexual sin".

== Hahalis Welfare Society ==
The Hahalis Welfare Society (HWS) was established in 1959 and claimed 3,500 members by 1963, spread over eight villages and 50 kilometres (30 mi) of coastline. Hagai and his brother-in-law John Teosin were the organisation's leaders, with Teosin serving as president and Hagai variously holding the titles of manager, secretary, and vice-president. He handled the organisation's public relations. In October 1963 Pacific Islands Monthly stated that Hagai "was once overshadowed by Teosin, but now he appears to lead".

The HWS functioned as a commune, pooling resources and sharing profits. Outside of its economic activities, Hagai and Teosin also sought to establish the HWS as an alternative church (sori lotu in Tok Pisin) with syncretic elements. Worship was held in open areas next to cemeteries, where "prayer and ritual invoked the dead to return and usher in a new world of lap-laps, tinned food, motorbikes and cars". The HWS was described by some as a cargo cult, a label which its leaders rejected. The society also practised free love and communal child-rearing. Hagai nonetheless maintained some elements of Catholic worship, producing a series of liturgies in the Halia language and introducing a parallel to the Eucharist that involved sharing of sliced banana instead of sacramental bread. He stated that "we pray to God in our own way so that He will be sorry for us when we die".

Hagai was an unsuccessful candidate at the 1964 and 1968 House of Assembly elections, although he "hardly campaigned outside H.W.S. villages and polled only local votes". In 1972 he participated in the Bougainville Awareness Seminar which foreshadowed Bougainvillean separatism in the lead-up to the independence of Papua New Guinea in 1975.

=== Conflict with authorities ===
In 1962, Hagai led the HWS in a protest over the imposition of a head tax intended to fund a local council established by the Australian administration. Two "battles" resulted with the local police, with 461 arrests made and 65 people injured. Hagai and Teosin were taken to the territorial capital Port Moresby and jailed, but their sentences were overturned by the administrator Donald Cleland on appeal. They were subsequently taken on chauffeur-driven tours of Port Moresby and Rabaul to demonstrate the supposed benefits of the Australian administration. Over the next few years a number of projects were initiated on Buka by both the civil authorities and the Catholic Church, in an attempt to quell the influence of the HWS.

Hagai travelled to Australia in 1966 to undertake further studies, at the invitation of an Anglican priest, Alf Clint. He received a scholarship to Tranby Aboriginal College in Sydney, studying bookkeeping and the history of the trade union and cooperative movements. John Pasquarelli, an Australian member of the PNG House of Assembly, alleged that Hagai's travel was being sponsored by the Communist Party of Australia or fellow travellers, and called on the administration to prevent him from leaving New Guinea. He described Hagai as "very politically dangerous". The district officer John Keith McCarthy stated his agreement with Pasquarelli, but noted that it would be politically unwise to prevent Hagai from travelling to Australia.

== Death and legacy ==
Hagai died at the Arawa hospital on 7 July 1974, following a motor vehicle accident at Basbi the previous day. He was a passenger in a car that collided with a stationary truck, with the driver and two other passengers receiving non-fatal injuries. In 1975, John Hakiolo pleaded guilty to dangerous driving causing death, with the prosecution alleging that he was driving while drunk.

Hagai's obituary in Pacific Islands Monthly concluded that his efforts had seen that "more government aid and attention was given to Buka". His entry in the Australian Dictionary of Biography calls him "a virile leader who sought to reconcile liberation from custom with traditional communality", leading an "autochthonous movement aspiring to modernization through self-rule".

== Bibliography ==
- Trompf, Garry W. (1994). Payback: The Logic of Retribution in Melanesian Religions. Cambridge: Cambridge University Press. ISBN 0-521-41691-4.
