= Reinhardt J. Keppler =

United States Navy Medal of Honor recipient

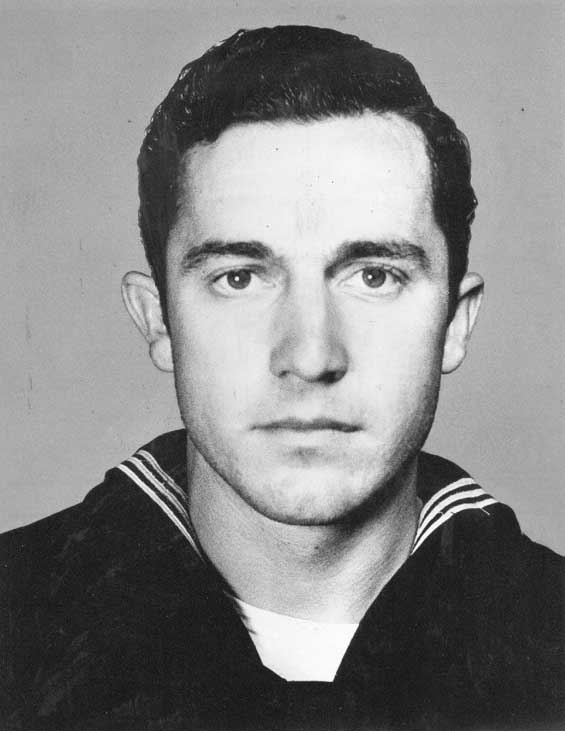
- Boatswain's Mate 1/c Reinhardt J. Keppler
- Born: Reinhardt John Keppler; January 22, 1918; Ralston, Washington, U.S.
- Died: November 15, 1942 (aged 24) off Guadalcanal, Solomon Islands
- Burial place: Golden Gate National Cemetery, San Bruno, California
- Military career
- Allegiance: United States
- Branch: United States Navy
- Service years: 1936–1942
- Rank: Boatswain's Mate First Class
- Unit: USS San Francisco (CA-38)
- Conflicts: World War II; *Solomon Islands campaign *Naval Battle of Guadalcanal
- Awards: Medal of Honor; Purple Heart

Reinhardt John Keppler (January 22, 1918 – November 15, 1942) was an American navy serviceman who posthumously received the Medal of Honor for his actions during the Naval Battle of Guadalcanal in World War II.

== Early life and military service ==
Keppler was born in Ralston, Washington. His father was a minister who transferred to the Northwest from the small town of Hosmer, South Dakota. He was raised in Washington and, after graduation from Wapato High School, enlisted in the United States Navy on February 19, 1936, aged 18.

After an honorable discharge, he reenlisted April 25, 1940 and was assigned to the heavy cruiser USS San Francisco (CA-38). Keppler was promoted to First Class Petty Officer at the beginning of October 1941. During the war Boatswain's Mate First Class Keppler participated in action at Pearl Harbor, the early wartime raids on Bougainville and New Guinea, and the Solomon Islands campaign.

When a Japanese bomber crashed into his ship on November 12, 1942, at the beginning of the Naval Battle of Guadalcanal, he assisted in caring for the resulting casualties. That night and into the early morning of November 13, as the San Francisco participated in a chaotic battle with enemy warships, he labored valiantly, despite mortal wounds, to save his ship and wounded shipmates. (His tombstone incorrectly lists Nov 15 as his death.) It was for his "extraordinary heroism and distinguished courage" on these occasions that Keppler was posthumously awarded the Medal of Honor. Keppler was initially buried at the American Military Cemetery at Espiritu Santo, Vanuatu; his remains were transferred in June 1948 to Golden Gate National Cemetery in San Bruno, California. He was survived by his widow and younger brother Ben (who grew up in Hosmer).

== Medal of Honor citation ==
=== Medal of Honor citation ===
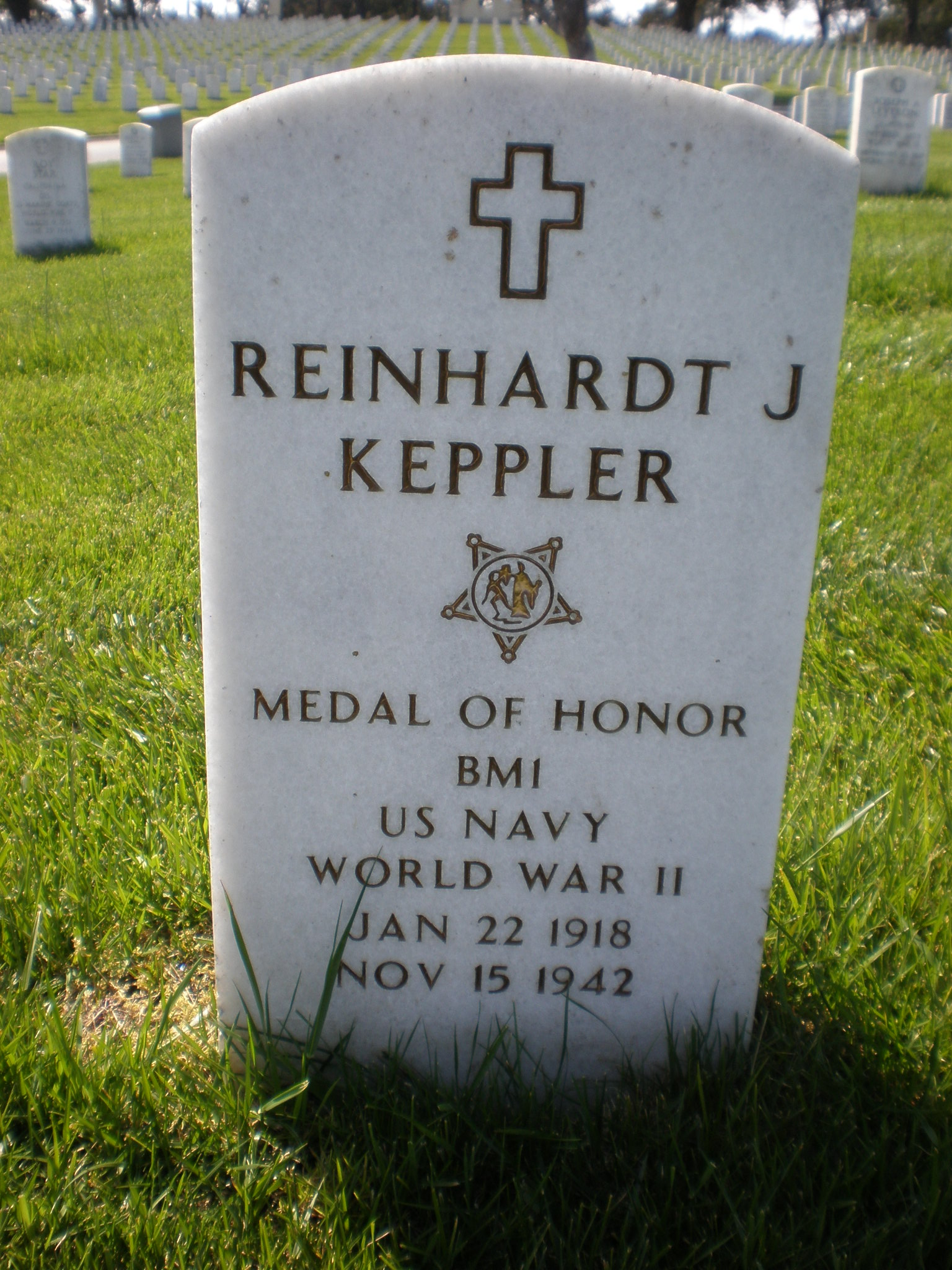
Keppler's headstone

Medal of Honor citation:

For extraordinary heroism and distinguished courage above and beyond the call of duty while serving aboard the U.S.S. San Francisco during action against enemy Japanese forces in the Solomon Islands, 12–November 13, 1942. When a hostile torpedo plane, during a daylight air raid, crashed on the after machine-gun platform, KEPPLER promptly assisted in the removal of the dead and, by his capable supervision of the wounded, undoubtedly helped save the lives of several shipmates who otherwise might have perished. That night, when the hangar was set afire during the great battle off Savo Island, he bravely led a hose into the starboard side of the stricken area and there, without assistance and despite frequent hits from terrific enemy bombardment, eventually brought the fire under control. Later, although mortally wounded, he labored valiantly in the midst of bursting shells, persistently directing fire-fighting operations and administrating to wounded personnel until he finally collapsed from loss of blood, aged 24. His great personal valor, maintained with utter disregard of personal safety, was in keeping with the highest traditions of the United States Naval Service. He gallantly gave his life for his country.

== Awards and decorations ==

1st row	Medal of Honor	Purple Heart	Combat Action Ribbon
2nd row	Presidential Unit Citation	Good Conduct Medal with one service star	American Defense Service Medal with Fleet Clasp
3rd row	American Campaign Medal	Asiatic-Pacific Campaign Medal with three campaign stars	World War II Victory Medal

=== Namesake ===
In 1946, the destroyer USS Keppler (DD-765), in commission from 1947 to 1972, was named in his honor. Previously, the destroyer escorts USS Keppler (DE-311) and USS Keppler (DE-375) had been named for him, but both were cancelled before construction began.

== See also ==
- List of Medal of Honor recipients
- List of Medal of Honor recipients for World War II
- "keppler.org: USS Keppler DD765/DDE765 Crew's Web Site".
