= Lauta Atoi =

PNG international rugby league footballer & politician

Personal information
- Born: 1962 (age 62–63); Bougainville, Papua New Guinea

Playing information
- Position: Centre, Five-eighth
Club
Years	Team	Pld	T	G	FG	P
	Redcliffe Dolphins
Representative
Years	Team	Pld	T	G	FG	P
1986–88	Papua New Guinea	7	2	0	0	8

Lauta Atoi (born 1962) is a Papua New Guinean politician and rugby league player. He was a People's National Congress member of the National Parliament of Papua New Guinea from 2011 to 2017, representing the electorate of North Bougainville Open. His name is sometimes spelled as Louta Atoi.

Atoi was educated at Tasman Primary School and Hutjena High School in Bougainville. He was a successful rugby league player, becoming a prominent member of the Papua New Guinea national rugby league team, and becoming the first Papua New Guinean to play rugby league in Australia, with the Redcliffe Dolphins. He subsequently became a businessman in Buka, managing Bougainville Sea Transit and Nukumanu Marine.

He was elected to the National Parliament of Papua New Guinea at a 2011 by-election to replace Michael Ogio, who had been appointed Governor-General of Papua New Guinea; in doing so, Atoi became the first MP from the atoll communities off the Bougainville coast. He was reported to have joined the Papua New Guinea Party in April 2012, but was re-elected for the People's National Congress amid some confusion in July. He supported the Belden Namah-led opposition for several months after the election, but returned to the government in July 2013, claiming he had continued to be a PNC member throughout.

He was defeated by William Nakin at the 2017 election.

National Parliament of Papua New Guinea
Preceded by Michael Ogio	Member for North Bougainville Open; 2011–2017	Succeeded by William Nakin
