= Selau =

Selau is a district of the Autonomous Region of Bougainville, Papua New Guinea. Generally it is known as Selau-Suir Rural LLG (Local Level Government) which is one of the districts in Bougainville.

The name Selau also represents the language of the area which is located in the northern tip of the larger island of Bougainville. It is commonly known as a dialect of the Halia language of the smaller Buka island which is located to the north and shares related cultural practices.

The main town in Selau is Kokopau.

== Villages ==
- Tangari

Siara, Chundawan, Tarbut, Sanakoba, Tortei, Anake, Gohi, Sorom, Manob, Kuskus, Kawegorto Kona, Abunmana,
