= Tangari, Papua New Guinea =

Town in Bougainville, Papua New Guinea

Tangari
- Village
- Location in Papua New Guinea
- Coordinates: 5°29′06″S 154°45′00″E
- Country: Republic of Bougainville
- District: North Bougainville District
- Local Level Government: Selau-Suir Rural LLG
- Time zone: UTC+11 (BST)

Tangari is a village in the Selau district of Bougainville, Papua New Guinea. It is located in north-western Bouganville near the Chabai Catholic mission.

It is one of the model villages covered by the Bougainville Healthy Community Programme (BHCP).
