= North Solomons =

North Solomons can refer to three overlapping sets of Melanesian islands in the Western Pacific:

- North Solomon Islands refers to the former colony of the German Solomon Islands
- North Solomons Province, a province of Papua New Guinea replaced by the Autonomous Region of Bougainville
- Republic of the North Solomons in part of the above, which unilaterally declared its independence but was reabsorbed into Papua New Guinea
