= Tangari =

Tangari may refer to:

- Tangari, Iran
- Tangari, Papua New Guinea
