= UPE =

UPE can refer to:

- Union Pearson Express
- Universal Primary Education
- Universidade de Pernambuco
- University of Paris-Est (Université Paris-Est), France
- University of Port Elizabeth
- The Unix Programming Environment
- Unsaturated polyester
- Upe, traditional Bougainvillean headdress, in Papua New Guinea
- Upe, the Polynesian term for the Marquesan imperial pigeon
- Upsilon Pi Epsilon, an honor society for computing and information, established in 1967 in Texas
- Upe, the symbol for the chemical element Unpentennium
- Union for Europe, the French acronym (used in official EU documents) for the European Parliamentary Group
- UPE (Mexibús), a BRT station in Ecatepec de Morelos, Mexico
- Ultraweak photon emission
- Undisclosed paid editing, a form of conflict-of-interest editing on Wikipedia
