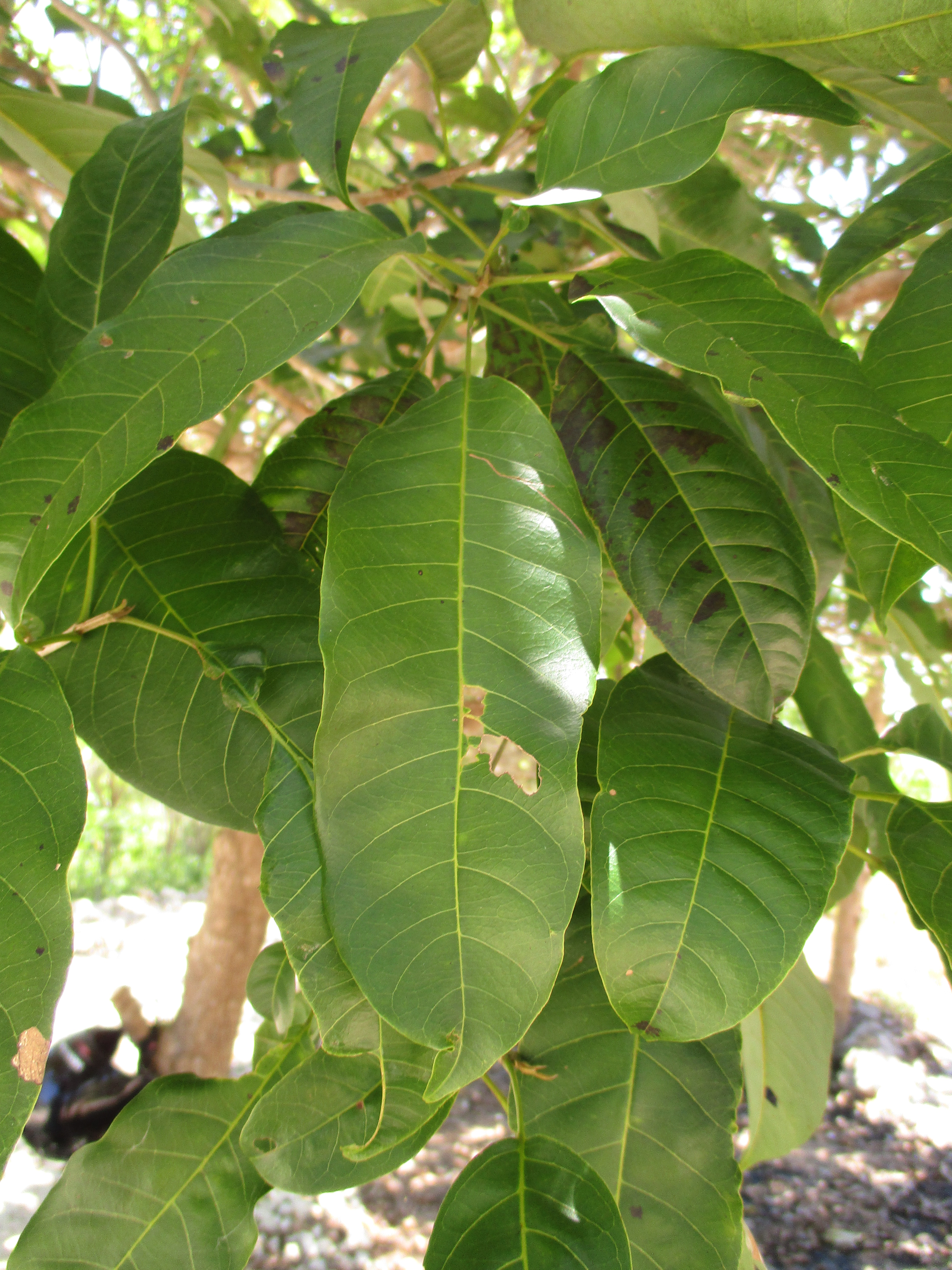
- Leaves
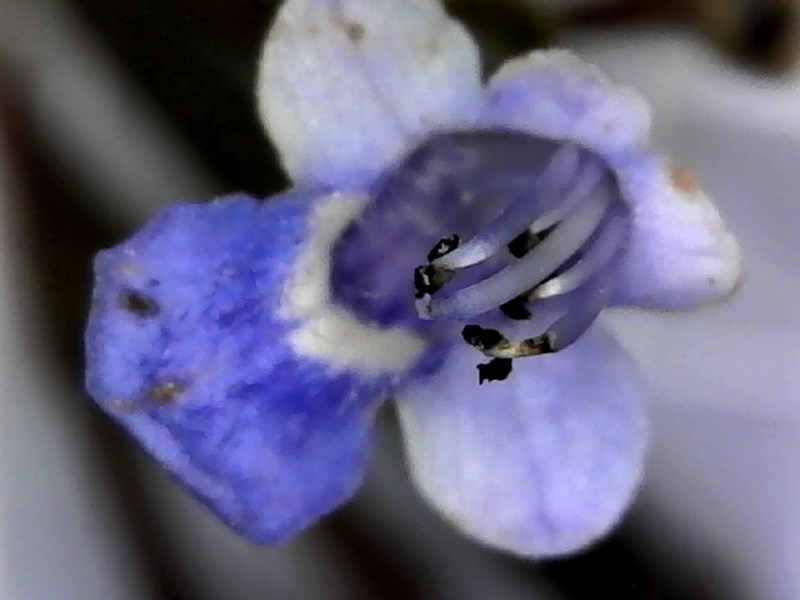
- Flower

Scientific classification
- Kingdom: Plantae
- Clade: Tracheophytes
- Clade: Angiosperms
- Clade: Eudicots
- Clade: Asterids
- Order: Lamiales
- Family: Lamiaceae
- Genus: Vitex
- Species: V. cofassus

Binomial name
- Vitex cofassus Reinw. ex Blume (1826)

Synonyms
- Vitex cofassus f. anomala Moldenke (1951); Vitex cofassus var. puberula H.J.Lam (1919); Vitex monophylla K.Schum. (1889); Vitex punctata Schauer (1847)

= Vitex cofassus =

Species of tree

Vitex cofassus is a species of flowering plant in the family Lamiaceae. It is a tree native to Sulawesi, the Maluku Islands, New Guinea, Bismarck Archipelago, Solomon Islands, Caroline Islands, and Mariana Islands. "New Guinea teak" is planted for its hardwood, used in construction, in Indonesia, Malaysia, and the Philippines.

In the Solomon Islands it is a characteristic tree of lowland forests, often co-dominant with Pometia pinnata.

It yields one of two woods from the same genus that are each called Molave Wood, the other being the timber of Vitex parviflora.
