= Nissan Rural LLG =

Local-level government in Papua New Guinea

- Country: Papua New Guinea
- Province: Autonomous Region of Bougainville
- District: North Bougainville District

Population (2011 census)
  - Total: 6,810
- Time zone: UTC+10 (AEST)

Nissan Rural LLG is a local-level government (LLG) of the Autonomous Region of Bougainville, Papua New Guinea. The LLG administers Green Islands, including Nissan Island.

== Wards ==
- 01. Tungol
- 02. Sigon
- 03. Pinepel
