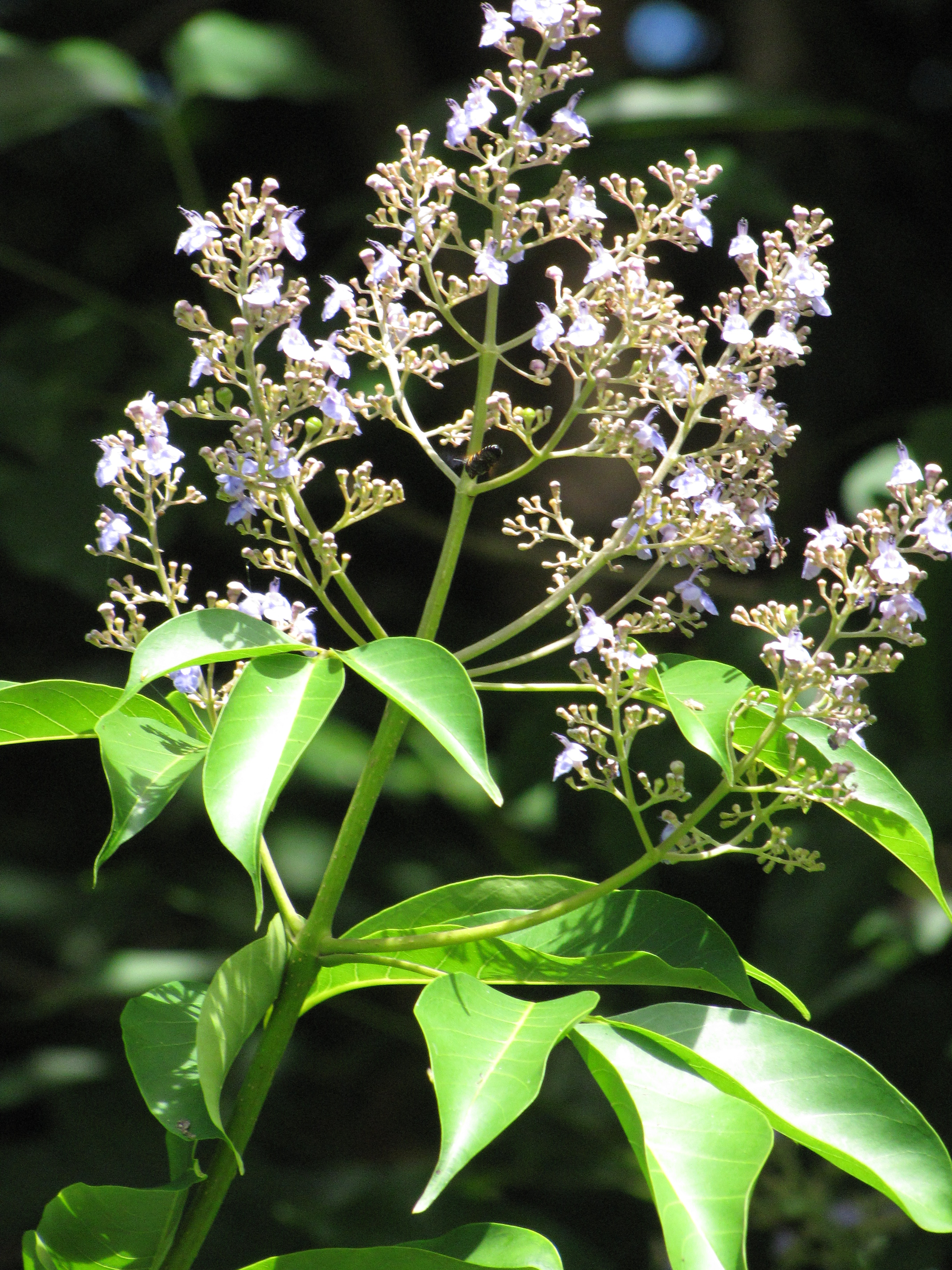

Conservation status
- Least Concern (IUCN 3.1)

Scientific classification
- Kingdom: Plantae
- Clade: Tracheophytes
- Clade: Angiosperms
- Clade: Eudicots
- Clade: Asterids
- Order: Lamiales
- Family: Lamiaceae
- Genus: Vitex
- Species: V. parviflora

Binomial name
- Vitex parviflora Juss.

= Vitex parviflora =

Species of tree

Vitex parviflora is a species of plant in the family Lamiaceae, also known as smallflower chastetree or the molave tree. The name "molave" is from Spanish, derived from mulawin, the Tagalog word for the tree. It is also known as tugas in Visayan languages. It is known as sagat in ilokano. It yields one of two woods from the same genus called molave wood, the other being Vitex cofassus.

It is a native species in Indonesia, Malaysia, and the Philippines. It can also be found in Central and South America, the Caribbean, Oceania, and Asia. It was reported to be an invasive species in Guam and Hawaii after it became naturalized in O'ahu and escaped from cultivation in Guam. In Cuba, it is also considered as a possibly invasive species due to naturalization.

It is valued in the Philippines for its dense durable wood and was once used extensively in furniture, boats (notably Manila galleons), utensils, and as construction material. The wood is also known to resist decay and termites. It became a protected species in the Philippines and it is illegal to cut its tree under certain conditions. Before 2019, it was listed as critically endangered, threatened and vulnerable in the assessments recorded in the IUCN Red List. As of 2017, the Philippine Department of Environment and Natural Resources classified it as endangered due to overharvesting and habitat loss. Although in 2019, the species was reassessed and declared as least concern by IUCN.
