= Justin Kili =

Justin Hansu Kili, often known as JK, OL MBE (c. 1953 – January 17, 2015) was a Papua New Guinean media personality, journalist, activist, and pioneer. His career, which began in the 1970s, spanned radio, television, and print media, including newspapers. Kili served on the boards of directors of numerous organizations, including the Media Council of Papua New Guinea and Transparency International Papua New Guinea (TIPNG).

Justin Kili was originally from Lemanmanu village, Buka Island, located in the present-day Autonomous Region of Bougainville. He began his career in radio in the 1970s. In 1972, journalist Keith Jackson hired Kili at Radio Bougainville, his first job in media and broadcasting.

Kili worked as a journalist for 35 years, focusing much of his work on corruption in government. He was a member of the Community Coalition Against Corruption through his work with Media Council of PNG.

In 1986, Juston Kili established CHM Supersound, a nationwide music program. He also created Papua New Guinea's first music countdown, The Weekly PNG Top 20, which also began airing on Kalang FM in 1986.

Nicknamed "the voice of PNG," Justin Kili worked with Radio Australia and the BBC. Kili, who was popularly known as JK, also hosted Pepsi Fizz, a national PNG television and music show which aired on EMTV. In 2004, Kili founded the Yumi FM PNG Annual Music Awards.

In 2008, he was named an Officer of the Order of Logohu "for services over 35 years to media work, promotion and publication of PNG music and providing and promoting International primary education to PNG children." He was severely injured in a car accident soon after receiving the award. He spent three months recovering from his injuries. Kili was the appointed head of the National Broadcasting Corporation in East New Britain Province in September 2008, just months after the accident.

Kili joined the board of Transparency International Papua New Guinea (TIPNG) in June 2014. In December 2014, Kili served as master of ceremonies for the official re-opening of Aropa Airport in the Autonomous Region of Bougainville. The airport had been closed for 24-years following the Bougainville Civil War. The re-opening ceremony, in which he appeared with Prime Minister Peter O'Neill and other officials, marked Kili's last public appearance.

Kili, a resident of Kokopo, died from a short illness on January 17, 2015, at Saint Mary's Vunapope Hospital in Vunapope, East New Britain Province, at the age of 61. He was survived by eight children and eleven grandchildren.
