= Halia language =

Language

Halia
- Selau
- Native to: Papua New Guinea
- Region: Buka Island, Selau Peninsula
- Native speakers: 25,000 (2005)
- Language family: Austronesian: Malayo-Polynesian; Oceanic; Western; Meso-Melanesian; Northwest Solomonic; Nehan–Bougainville; Buka; Halia–Hakö; Halia

Language codes
- ISO 639-3: hla
- Glottolog: hali1244

Halia is an Austronesian language of Buka Island and the Selau Peninsula of Bougainville Island, Papua New Guinea.

== Phonology ==
The phonology of the Halia language:

=== Consonants ===
		Labial	Alveolar	Palatal	Velar	Glottal
Nasal		m	n		ŋ	
Plosive	voiceless	p	t		k	
Plosive	voiced	b			g	
Affricate			ts ~ tʃ			
Fricative			s			h
Lateral			l			
Rhotic			r			
Semivowel		w		j		

=== Vowels ===
	Front	Central	Back
High	i		u
High	ɪ		ʊ
Mid	(e)		o
Mid	ɛ		ɔ
Low		a	

Diphthong vowel sounds include /ei, au, ou/.

[e] exists, but not as a monophthong.

=== Allophones ===
Phoneme	Allophones
/b/	[β]
/ɡ/	[ɣ], [χ]
/ts/	[tʃ]
/r/	[ɾ]
/a/	[æ], [ɐ], [ʌ]
/ʊ/	[ɨ]
/ei/	[e], [ɛi], [ɛ]

== Grammar ==
=== Pronouns ===
There are four sets of pronouns. The first set functions as the subject when preceding the verb. Set 2 functions as a subject or object when following the verb. Set 3 is used for inalienable possession. Set 4 is used for alienable possession. There is an inclusive/exclusive first person distinction.

Pronoun	1	2	3	4
1SG	alia	lia	-r	i tar
2SG	alö	lö	-mulö	i tamulö
3SG	nonei	-en	-nen	i tanen
1PL (incl.)	ara	ra	-rara	i tarara
1PL (excl.)	alam	lam	-mulam	i tamulam
2PL	alimiu	limiu	-milimiu	i tamilimiu
3PL	nori	-en	-ren	i taren

The suffix -e signifies a transitive verb.

== Literature ==
In the 1960s Francis Hagai produced a series of liturgies in Halia as part of his work with the Hahalis Welfare Society.
