= Flag of Bougainville =

Regional flag

Bougainville
- Use: Civil and state flag
- Proportion: 2:3
- Adopted: 1975
- Design: Red and white upe headdress superimposed on a green and white kapkap, on a field of cobalt blue.
- Designed by: Jonathan Havini; Marilyn Havini; Moses Havini

The flag of Bougainville (Tok Pisin: plak bilong Bogenvil) is a symbol of the Autonomous Region of Bougainville in Papua New Guinea. It was originally adopted in 1975 by the secessionist Republic of the North Solomons.

== Design and symbolism ==
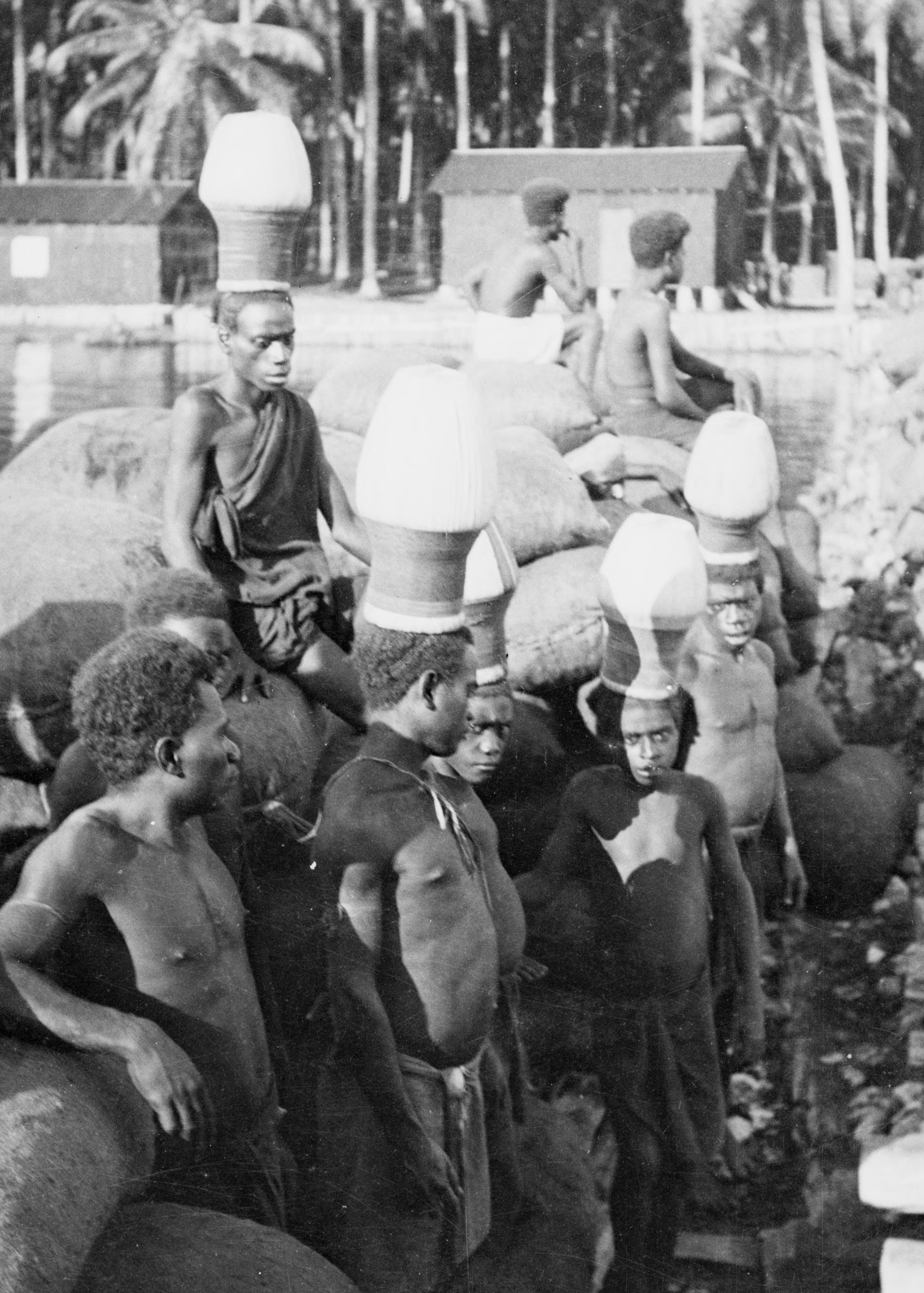
Men from Soraken wearing upe, a headdress representing the transition to adulthood which later became a national symbol of Bougainville

According to the Bougainville Flag, Emblem and Anthem (Protection) Act 2018, the flag consists of "a depiction of an upe superimposed over concentric discs of black and white on a cobalt blue field". The upe is a traditional headdress worn by Bougainvillean men as a symbol of adulthood. The black disc "represents the distinctive skin colour of the Bougainvillean people", while the white disc represents the kapkap, a traditional symbol of authority made from mother of pearl. The 24 green equilateral triangles within the kapkap symbolise "the importance of land to the Bougainvillean people", the blue field represents the ocean. The official flag aspect ratio is 2:3.

== History ==
The flag was designed by Jonathan Havini and his son Moses Havini, with the first flag produced by Moses's Australian wife Marilyn Havini. It was first raised at Arawa on 1 September 1975, during the independence celebrations for the unrecognised Republic of North Solomons. It was chosen in a nationwide competition, with the selection panel appointed by the Bougainville Provincial Assembly including John Momis, Peter Sissiou and Leo Hannett.

As a symbol of secession, the flag was initially proscribed by the PNG government. In January 1976, a primary school on Buka Island was shut down for flying the flag. However, the flag was retained by the North Solomons Province following the reintegration of the republic into PNG in 1976. The Provincial Symbols Act 1978 gave official status to the flag and made it an offence to use it commercially without the consent of the responsible minister. Later, the Autonomous Bougainville Government's Bougainville Flag, Emblem and Anthem (Protection) Act 2018 reaffirmed the official status of the flag. It also created a new offense of using, displaying, destroying or damaging the flag with the intention to dishonor it, with a maximum fine of 10,000 kina or around $2,900 as of December 2020, and extended the fine for unauthorized commercial use to a maximum of 100,000 kina for corporations.

== See also ==
- Flag of Papua New Guinea
- List of Papua New Guinean flags
