= Alexis Sarei =

Papua New Guinean politician

Sir Alexis Holyweek Sarei, CBE (25 March 1934 – 22 September 2014) was a Papua New Guinean politician from Bougainville. He governed North Solomons Province (Bougainville) as district commissioner from 1973 to 1975, as president of the secessionist Republic of the North Solomons that existed from 1975 to 1976, and as premier twice, from 1976 to 1980 and again from 1984 to 1987. Between premierships, he also served as Papua New Guinean High Commissioner to the United Kingdom.

Political offices
First	District commissioner of North Solomons Province; 1973–1975	secession
First secession	President of the Republic of the North Solomons; 1975–1976	rejoined Papua New Guinea
First	Premier of North Solomons Province; 1976–1980	Succeeded by Leo Hannett
Preceded by Leo Hannett	Premier of North Solomons Province; 1984–1987	Succeeded by Joseph Kabui
Diplomatic posts
Preceded by	Papua New Guinean High Commissioner to the United Kingdom	Succeeded by
