= USS Keppler (DD-765) =

Gearing-class destroyer

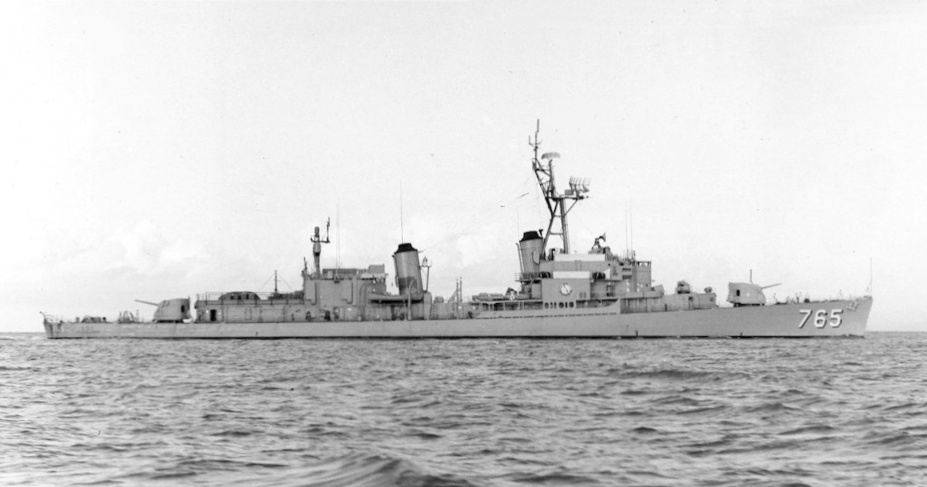
- USS Keppler (DD-765) in Roosevelt Roads 1965

History

United States
- Name: USS Keppler
- Namesake: Reinhardt J. Keppler
- Builder: Bethlehem Shipbuilding Corporation, San Francisco, CA
- Launched: 24 June 1946
- Commissioned: 23 May 1947
- Modernized: 25 October 1961 (FRAM II)
- Decommissioned: 1 July 1972
- Reclassified: DDE-765, 4 March 1950; DD-765, 1962
- Identification: Callsign: NKPD; Hull number: DD-765
- Honors and awards: 2 battle stars (Korea)
- Fate: Sold to Turkey

Turkey
- Name: TCG Tınaztepe (D 355)
- Namesake: Town of Tınaztepe
- Acquired: 1 July 1972
- Decommissioned: 31 October 1984
- Out of service: 2 May 1984
- Fate: Scrapped

General characteristics
- Class & type: Gearing-class destroyer
- Displacement: 2,425 long tons (2,464 t)
- Length: 390 ft 6 in (119.02 m)
- Beam: 41 ft 1 in (12.52 m)
- Draft: 18 ft 6 in (5.64 m)
- Speed: 35 knots (65 km/h; 40 mph)
- Complement: 267
- Armament: 6 × 5"/38 caliber guns; 16 × 40 mm AA guns; 20 × 20 mm AA guns; 5 × 21 inch (533 mm) torpedo tubes; 6 × depth charge projectors; 2 × depth charge tracks

The third USS Keppler (DD/DDE-765) was a Gearing-class destroyer in the United States Navy during the Korean War and the Vietnam War. She was named for Boatswain's Mate First Class Reinhardt J. Keppler (1918–1942), who was posthumously awarded the Medal of Honor for "extraordinary heroism" during the Naval Battle of Guadalcanal.

Keppler was launched on 24 June 1946 by Bethlehem Steel Corporation, Shipbuilding Division, San Francisco, California sponsored by Mrs. Elizabeth L. Keppler, widow of BM1c Keppler; and commissioned on 23 May 1947.

== Service history ==
=== 1947–1950 ===
After shakedown along the West Coast, Keppler cleared San Diego, California on 9 October 1947 for training exercises in Hawaiian waters. The destroyer then sailed to Australia and China before returning San Diego on 20 May 1948. Early in 1949 Keppler entered San Francisco Navy Yard for conversion to antisubmarine destroyer. Resuming operations on the West Coast on 9 June, she departed San Diego on 5 October for duty in the Atlantic.

Arriving Norfolk, Virginia 15 days later, she immediately commenced intensive anti-submarine warfare (ASW) exercises along the Atlantic Coast. Keppler sailed to Newport, Rhode Island, her new homeport, for additional hunter-killer operations, arriving on 27 November. She was reclassified DDE-765 on 4 March 1950 and cleared Newport on 5 July for the Mediterranean Sea. Arriving Greece on 27 July, the anti-submarine destroyer was ordered to the Far East on the eve of the Korean War.

=== Korea, 1950–1951 ===
After transiting the Suez Canal and crossing the Indian Ocean, Keppler joined the 7th Fleet in mid-August. For the next two months she patrolled the Formosa Strait before joining Philippine Sea (CV-47) on 17 November. For the next three months she screened her task group during continued carrier air strikes against Communist positions on the Korean mainland. Keppler then steamed for Yokosuka, Japan, arriving on 7 February 1951. Three days later she cleared port for the United States, reaching Newport on 14 March. She was overhauled and for the rest of the year engaged in refresher training and ASW operations.

=== 1952–1960 ===
Keppler cleared Newport once again on 9 January 1952 to participate in anti-submarine exercises with the 6th Fleet. This cruise culminated in NATO Exercise "Grandslam," in which ships of several nations operated together in practice maneuvers. The anti-submarine destroyer returned to Newport on 26 March and resumed operations along the Atlantic Coast.

From 1952 to 1957 Keppler continued her ASW exercises out of Newport and the Caribbean Sea in addition to NATO operations and Mediterranean cruises with the 6th Fleet.

On 4 January 1957 she sailed toward South American waters for a training and good will cruise. Before returning Newport on 18 March, she visited ports in Colombia, Ecuador, Peru, Chile, Panama, and Cuba. After completing additional coastal exercises, Keppler was deployed to the Mediterranean on 12 August. During September she transited the Suez Canal to the Red Sea, during the United Arab Republic conflict with Jordan. Keppler returned to Newport on 21 December.

From 1958 to 1961 the anti-submarine destroyer engaged in concentrated ASW operations along the Atlantic coast and Caribbean NATO exercises, a midshipmen cruise in 1959, and a 6th Fleet deployment in the summer of 1960.

=== 1961–1972 ===
Keppler entered New York Naval Shipyard on 1 March 1961 for a Fleet Rehabilitation and Modernization (FRAM) II overhaul designed to increase her service and effectiveness. Following the overhaul she returned Newport on 25 October and resumed anti-submarine duty on 8 March 1962. Keppler sailed on 4 June for a summer midshipmen cruise to Europe, returning to Newport on 30 August. She was reclassified DD-765 during that period.

Keppler cleared Newport on 22 October to take her station in the blockade during the Cuban Missile Crisis. While patrolling her Caribbean sector, she sighted a surfaced Russian submarine on 2 November and observed her for the next seven days. On 9 November the submarine joined a Russian trawler, and Keppler continued her surveillance until the Russian ships turned back toward the Azores. The destroyer returned Newport on 21 November.

During 1963 and 1964 Keppler continued hunter-killer exercises along the East Coast and Caribbean. She sailed on 8 September 1964 for Mediterranean deployment and engaged in NATO exercises en route. The destroyer returned home on 18 December.

Following overhaul in Boston Naval Shipyard, Keppler operated out of Newport until sailing for the Far East on 4 October 1966. Steaming via the Panama Canal she arrived Pearl Harbor on 24 October and pushed on toward Japan a week later. She departed Yokosuka on 14 November for plane guard duty in the Gulf of Tonkin. Early in December she was assigned naval gunfire support missions to assist allied troops fighting in South Vietnam, and she also served in "Operation Sea Dragon" helping to interrupt infiltration of men and weapons into South Vietnam from the North. On the night of 11–12 December she rescued a downed pilot. Early in 1967 she returned to "Yankee Station" for plane guard duty and on 28 January assisted in the rescue of another pilot. In January and February her guns damaged or destroyed 51 Communist junks. During this period Keppler frequently engaged batteries ashore, and 11 March a Communist gun scored a hit on one of the destroyer's gun mounts. She remained in the fight until returning to Subic Bay on the 23rd. Three days later she headed homeward via the Indian Ocean, the Suez Canal, and the Mediterranean. Upon arriving Newport on 8 May she resumed operations along the East Coast. In April 1970, Keppler was transferred to the Pacific Fleet and homeported at Pearl Harbor, Hawaii.

== TCG Tınaztepe (D 355) ==
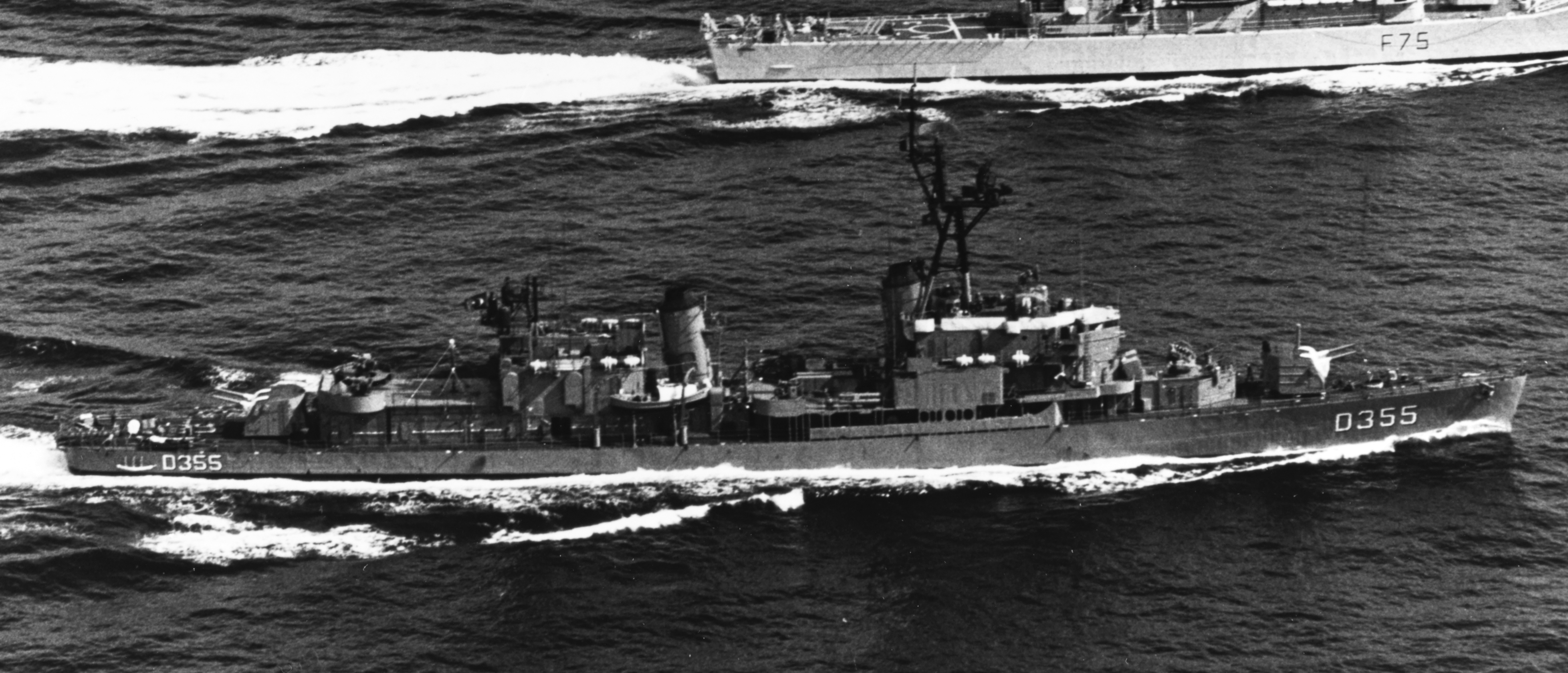
TCG Tınaztepe operating with other NATO ships in the Mediterranean Sea, 1979.

Keppler was decommissioned on 1 July 1972 and sold to Turkey & renamed TCG Tınaztepe (D 355). On 2 May 1984, she & a civilian petrol tanker, Aygaz-3, collided in the Izmit gulf; in this accident, four sailors of Tınaztepe died. After the accident, the destroyer could not be repaired, and she was decommissioned on 31 October 1984. Subsequently, she was scrapped.

== Awards ==
Keppler received two battle stars for Korean service.
