= Kilu Cave =

Anthropological site in Papua New Guinea

- Site DJA
- location in Papua New Guinea
- 5°20′8″S 154°41′14″E
- Type: limestone rockshelter
- Periods: Pleistocene, Holocene
- Location: Autonomous Region of Bougainville, Papua New Guinea
- Region: Buka Island

Site notes
- Elevation: 8 m (26 ft)
- Height: 4 m (13 ft)
- Length: 17 m (56 ft)
- Width: 33 m (108 ft)
- Excavation dates: 1987
- Archaeologists: Stephen Wickler

Kilu Cave is a Paleoanthropological site located on Buka Island in the Autonomous Region of Bougainville, Papua New Guinea. Kilu Cave is located at the base of a limestone cliff, 65 m (213 ft) from the modern coastline. With evidence for human occupation dating back to 30,000 years, Kilu Cave is the earliest known site for human occupation in the Solomon Islands archipelago. The site is the oldest proof of Paleolithic people navigating the open ocean i.e. navigating without land in sight. To travel from Nissan island to Buka requires crossing of at least 60 kilometres (37 mi) of open sea. The presence of paleolithic people at Buka therefore is at the same time evidence for the oldest and the longest paleolithic sea travel known so far.

== Background ==
Before the discovery of Kilu Cave in 1987, the earliest sites showing evidence for human occupation in the Solomon Islands archipelago were Lapita sites dating back to around 3,000 years old. However, archaeologists had long believed that human occupation in the Solomon Islands occurred much earlier, based on linguistic and anthropological evidence.

During the coldest part of the last Ice Age (28,000 to 18,000 years ago), Buka Island was part of a much larger island, Greater Bougainville, which connected the present-day islands of Buka, Bougainville, Shortland Islands, Choiseul, Santa Isabel and Nggela into one large, contiguous island; this large island was narrowly separated from Guadalcanal. At its maximum, Greater Bougainville would have had a total land area of around 46,400 square kilometres (17,900 sq mi).

Reaching Kilu Cave required crossing the Wallace Line, reaching the Sahul and making further sea crossings to reach Greater Bougainville. Archaeologically, the people at Greater Bougainville appeared to live in relative isolation after arriving at the island, with the isolation possibly punctuated by the external introduction of Phalanger orientalis and Canarium indicum. This relative isolation ended with the arrival of the Lapita people.

== Stratigraphy ==
Kilu Cave was first occupied during the Pleistocene from around 29,000 to 20,000 BP. The earliest radiocarbon date (ANU-5990: 28740 +/- 280 BP) was made on the shell of a sea snail (Nerita) and using the southern curve (SHCAL13) calibrates to between 29,850-31,560 BC cal (95% probability).

After a hiatus during the end of the Pleistocene the cave is reoccupied more intensively during the Holocene from around 9,000 to 5,000 BP. The hiatus in occupation was most likely due to changes in the sea level that left Kilu Cave far away from the coastline. Some post-Lapita Buka phase pottery was also found at Kilu Cave in its upper layers after around 2,500 BP.

== Fauna ==
The people of Kilu Cave exploited a wide range of terrestrial and marine animals for food. Most of the animal bones found at Kilu Cave were probably due to human predation. The site contains a large assemblage of shell, fish bones and terrestrial animal remains. The terrestrial animal remains came from mammals and reptiles. The mammalian remains were dominated by rodents, followed by bats. The reptilian remains came primarily from lizards, followed by snakes, with some coming from turtles and frogs. The lizard assemblage mostly came from varanids and skinks, with some coming from agamids.

The bones of both reef and pelagic fish were found at Kilu Cave. While the bulk of the fish bone remains came from reef fish, about 20% of the fish bones from the Pleistocene layer came from pelagic fish. The pelagic fish bones came from the Scombridae, Coryphaena and Carangidae families. The most commonly found fish remains at Kilu Cave came from sharks. The shell assemblage was dominated by Nerita undata and Nerita plicata.

Several extinct species were discovered at Kilu Cave. The extinction and extirpation of various bird and mammalian fauna on Baku Island appeared to coincide with the arrival of the Lapita culture.

77 bird bones were recovered from the site. The bones came from 18 different species of landbirds, 7 of which are unspecified or now extinct and 11 of which are now extirpated from Buka Island. Five species of rat endemic to the Solomon Islands were identified. Two new species of rat, Solomys spriggsarum and Melomys spechti, were identified from fossil remains at Kilu Cave.

== Archaeobotany ==
Kilu Cave is currently the only site in Melanesia with evidence for plant use by the initial inhabitants of the region. The presence of taro starch grains were discovered on 17 of the lithic tools from the Pleistocene layer at Kilu Cave. Two types of taro were discovered at Kilu Cave, Colocasia and Alocasia, with 14 tools identified with the former and 3 with the latter. The people of Kilu Cave also appeared to have used galip nut (Canarium: Canarium indicum and Canarium solomonense) and coconut (Cocos nucifera) as resources.

== Artefacts ==
The artefact assemblage at Kilu Cave consists primarily of simple flaked tools made from volcanic rock (~ 80% of all artefacts), quartz, calcite and chert. 214 such artefacts were discovered at the site; most of these lithic artefacts (200) came from the Pleistocene layer. Shell artefacts were also recovered from the site. Shell artefacts made from Turbo marmoratus were found in the Pleistocene layer, while shell artefacts made from Terebralia palustris and Tridacna were found in the Holocene layer. Perforated shark teeth were also found in the Holocene layer. 44 pottery sherds were discovered in the upper layers of the site and typed to the Buka phase of the Lapita culture.
