= Upe =

Traditional Bougainvillean headdress

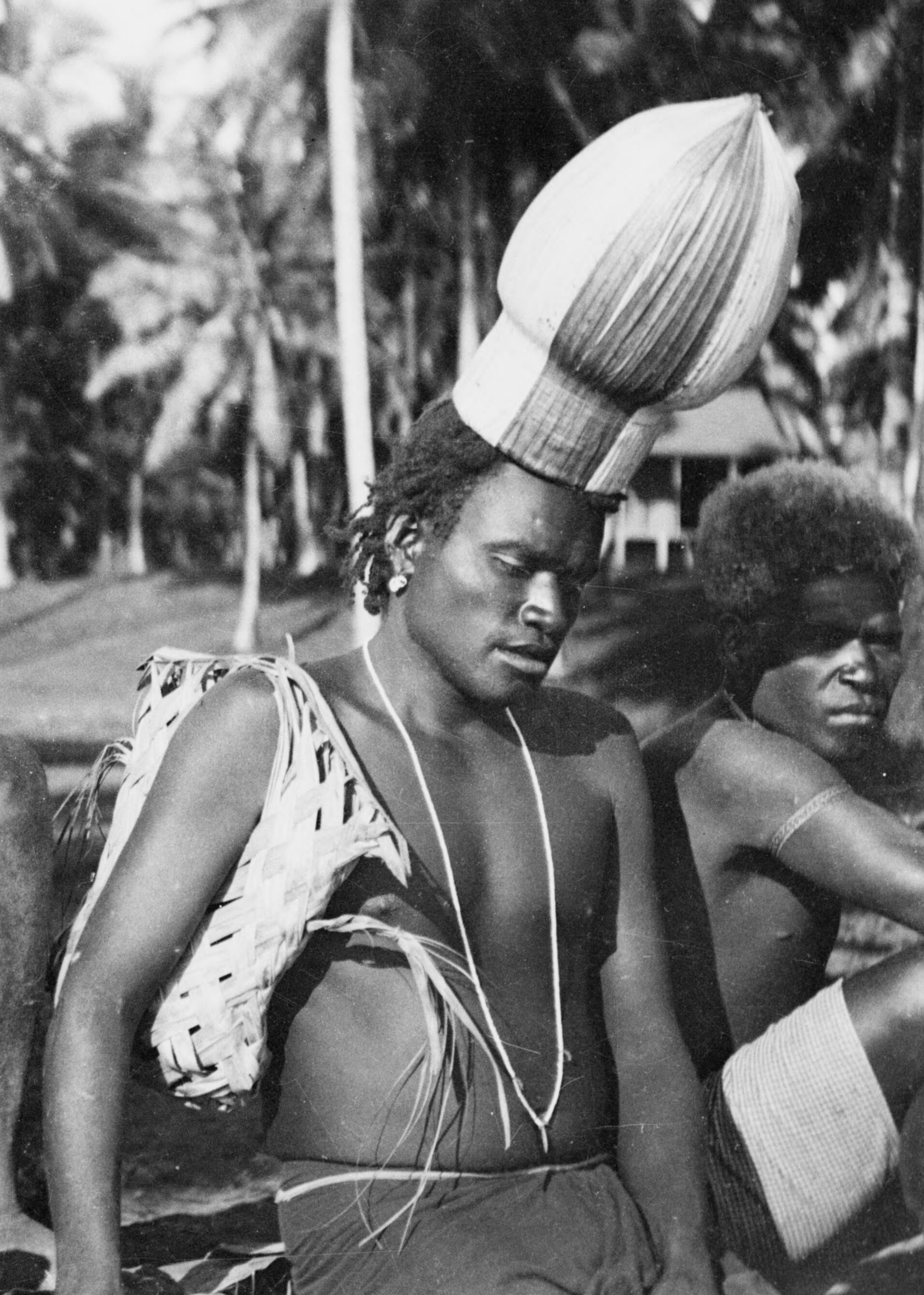
Two men wearing ombu (upe) ceremonial initiation hats, Soraken, Bougainville Island

The upe (or upi) is a traditional headdress worn by men in parts of Bougainville (an autonomous region of Papua New Guinea) to symbolise their transition to adulthood. The term is also used to refer to the process of undergoing the transition and to the initiates themselves.

The upe is the central figure of the flag of Bougainville and forms the main device of the emblem of Bougainville. It is made of tightly wound straw.

According to the Papua New Guinea Post-Courier, the tradition is practised on Buka Island and in the Bougainville Island districts of Selau, Wakunai and Teua. Upes spend as long as three years undergoing initiation rites in a "school" or "college", located in a remote region. They learn traditional customs including medicine, fishing, hunting, gardening, and singing. During this time women are forbidden to see them.

During the 2019 independence referendum, upes were authorised to vote at special male-only polling stations to avoid being seen by women. Election officials "hiked for two hours into the jungle to collect the votes".

== See also ==
- List of hat styles
