= Invasion of Buka and Bougainville =

Action of World War II in the South Pacific

- Part of the Pacific Theater of World War II
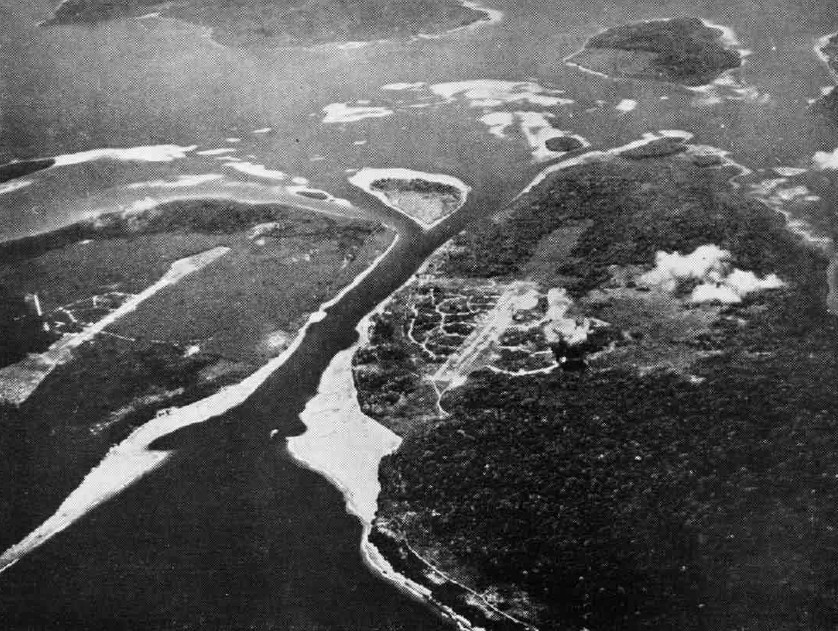
- View of Buka (right) and Bougainville (left) islands, taken in 1943. The two islands are divided by the Buka Passage.
Date	9 March – 5 April 1942
Location	6°8′S 155°18′E; Buka and Bougainville Islands, Territory of New Guinea (geographically part of the Solomon Islands)
Result	Japanese victory

Belligerents
Australia	Japan

Commanders and leaders
J.M. Mackie	Kanazawa Masao

Strength
24 troops	Unknown

Between 9 March and 5 April 1942 during World War II, forces of the Empire of Japan occupied the islands of Buka and Bougainville in the South Pacific. At that time Buka and Bougainville were part of the Australian-administered Territory of New Guinea. A platoon of Australian commandos from the 1st Independent Company was located at Buka Airfield when the Japanese landed but did not contest the invasion.

The Japanese invaded in order to construct naval and air bases to provide security for their major base at Rabaul, New Britain and to support strategic operations in the Solomon Islands. After the occupation of Buka and Bougainville, the Japanese began constructing airfields across the island. The main airfields were on Buka Island, on the nearby Bonis Peninsula, and at Kahili and Kieta, while naval bases were also constructed at Buin in the south and on the nearby Shortland Islands. These bases allowed the Japanese to conduct operations in the southern Solomon Islands and to attack the Allied lines of communication between the US and the Southwest Pacific Area.

In November 1943, Allied forces landed on the west coast of Bougainville as part of the latter stages of Operation Cartwheel and began building air bases to assist in the isolation and neutralization of Rabaul. U.S. Marines landed at Cape Torokina and established a beachhead within which the Allies eventually constructed three airfields. The invasion force was later replaced by U.S. Army soldiers in January 1944, and these were replaced by Australian Militia troops in October 1944. The campaign ended with the surrender of Japanese forces in August 1945.

The fighting on Buka is depicted in the works of Somuk, a local artist who achieved prominence as a figure on the French art brut scene. One crayon drawing shows local workers in lap-laps undertaking forced labour under Japanese supervisors, likely depicting the construction of an airfield. Another drawing shows the Allied bombing of Buka Island, which had a "devastating impact on local populations" both from direct fatalities and from starvation and disease as residents fled to the island's forests and caves.
