= Our Lady of the Assumption Cathedral, Buka =

Cathedral in Papua New Guinea

Coordinates: 5°24′27.6″S 154°41′2.5″E

Our Lady of the Assumption Cathedral
- Our Lady of the Assumption Cathedral
- Location: Buka
- Country: Papua New Guinea
- Denomination: Roman Catholic Church

The Our Lady of the Assumption Cathedral is a religious building belonging to the Roman Catholic Church and is located in the town of Buka on the south coast of the island of Buka, in the autonomous region of Bougainville, formerly ″province of Bougainville″ which is part of Papua New Guinea a country in Oceania.

The cathedral follows the Roman or Latin rite and depends on the Roman Catholic Diocese of Bougainville (Dioecesis Buganvillensis), which in turn is under the responsibility of the Congregation for the Evangelization of Peoples (Congregatio pro Gentium Evangelizatione).

The ancient cathedral of the diocese was the church of St. Michael the Archangel in Tubiana, in the same province.

== See also ==
- Roman Catholicism in Papua New Guinea
- Our Lady of the Assumption Church (disambiguation)
