= Solomys =

Scientific classification
- Domain: Eukaryota
- Kingdom: Animalia
- Phylum: Chordata
- Class: Mammalia
- Order: Rodentia
- Family: Muridae
- Subfamily: Murinae
- Tribe: Hydromyini
- Genus: Solomys; Thomas, 1922

Type species
- Uromys sapientis

Species
- Solomys ponceleti; Solomys salamonis; Solomys salebrosus; Solomys sapientis; †Solomys spriggsarum

Genus of rodents

Solomys is a genus of rodent in the family Muridae. These large rats, which are all seriously threatened (one already extinct), are native to the Solomon Islands.

It contains the following species:

- Poncelet's giant rat (Solomys ponceleti)
- Florida naked-tailed rat (Solomys salamonis)
- Bougainville naked-tailed rat (Solomys salebrosus)
- Isabel naked-tailed rat (Solomys sapientis)
- Buka Island naked-tailed rat (Solomys spriggsarum) – extinct, known only from subfossil remains.
