= Emblem of Bougainville =

Symbol of the Autonomous Region of Bougainville

- Armiger: The Autonomous Bougainville Government
- Adopted: 1978, 2002
- Crest: Upe head dress
- Torse: Drum sticks
- Shield: Garamut drum
- Motto: Autonomous Region of Bougainville

The Emblem of Bougainville is an official symbol of the Autonomous Region of Bougainville in Papua New Guinea.

The emblem depicts a traditional garamut drum, drum sticks and an upe head dress. It was initially adopted in 1978 for the then province of North Solomons and continued to remain in use, with a modified legend, when the Autonomous Region of Bougainville was created in 2002.

== See also ==
- Emblem of Papua New Guinea
