= Bougainville naked-tailed rat =

Conservation status
- Vulnerable (IUCN 3.1)

Scientific classification
- Kingdom: Animalia
- Phylum: Chordata
- Class: Mammalia
- Order: Rodentia
- Family: Muridae
- Genus: Solomys
- Species: S. salebrosus

Binomial name
- Solomys salebrosus Troughton, 1936

Species of rodent

The Bougainville naked-tailed rat (Solomys salebrosus) or Bougainville giant rat is a species of rodent in the family Muridae. It is found in Papua New Guinea and the Solomon Islands.
