= Buka Island solomys =

Buka Island solomys Temporal range: Early Holocene

Scientific classification
- Kingdom: Animalia
- Phylum: Chordata
- Class: Mammalia
- Order: Rodentia
- Family: Muridae
- Genus: Solomys
- Species: †S. spriggsarum

Binomial name
- †Solomys spriggsarum Flannery and Wickler, 1990

Extinct species of rodent

The Buka Island solomys (Solomys spriggsarum), also known as the Buka naked-tailed rat or Buka Island naked-tailed rat, is an extinct species of rodent known only from subfossil remains. This species occurred on Buka Island, the second largest island in the Papua New Guinean province of Bougainville.
