= Isabel naked-tailed rat =

Conservation status
- Endangered (IUCN 3.1)

Scientific classification
- Kingdom: Animalia
- Phylum: Chordata
- Class: Mammalia
- Order: Rodentia
- Family: Muridae
- Genus: Solomys
- Species: S. sapientis

Binomial name
- Solomys sapientis (Thomas, 1902)

Species of rodent

The Isabel naked-tailed rat (Solomys sapientis) is a species of rodent in the family Muridae. It is found only on the island of Santa Isabel in the Solomon Islands.
