= Ugi naked-tailed rat =

Conservation status
- Data Deficient (IUCN 3.1)

Scientific classification
- Kingdom: Animalia
- Phylum: Chordata
- Class: Mammalia
- Order: Rodentia
- Family: Muridae
- Genus: Solomys
- Species: S. salamonis

Binomial name
- Solomys salamonis (Ramsay, 1883)

Synonyms
- Mus salamonis

Extinct species of rodent

The Ugi naked-tailed rat (Solomys salamonis) is a poorly known and possibly extinct species of rodent in the family Muridae. It is known from a single specimen collected on Ugi Island in the Solomon Islands.

== Description ==
The Ugi naked-tailed rat is the smallest species within the genus Solomys. It has a snout-vent-length of 187 mm. The tail length is 194 mm, the hind food length is 39 mm and the ear length 27 mm. The general colour of the fur is light ashy grey, somewhat grizzly, and pencilled with black. The base of the hair is mouse colour. The tips are almost white. The tail is bare and scaly. The blackish whiskers are long. The ears are small, inside grey, on the outside covered with minute hairs.

== Type locality ==
Originally described from Ugi Island, there has long been confusion as to whether the specimen was from there or from Florida Island, some 210 km distant from Ugi. Lavery showed that the original description was correct, and that the sole specimen was collected on Ugi Island.

== Conservation status ==
This species might be extinct as it is only known by the holotype, an adult male, collected by Alexander Morton from the Australian Museum during the HMS Cormorant expedition to the Solomon Islands in 1881. A brief survey on Ugi in 2012 failed to find any individuals, but at the time of the survey original forest still occurred, giving some hope that the species may yet be extant.
