= Nissan Island =

Island in Papua New Guinea

Coordinates: 4°30′S 154°13′E

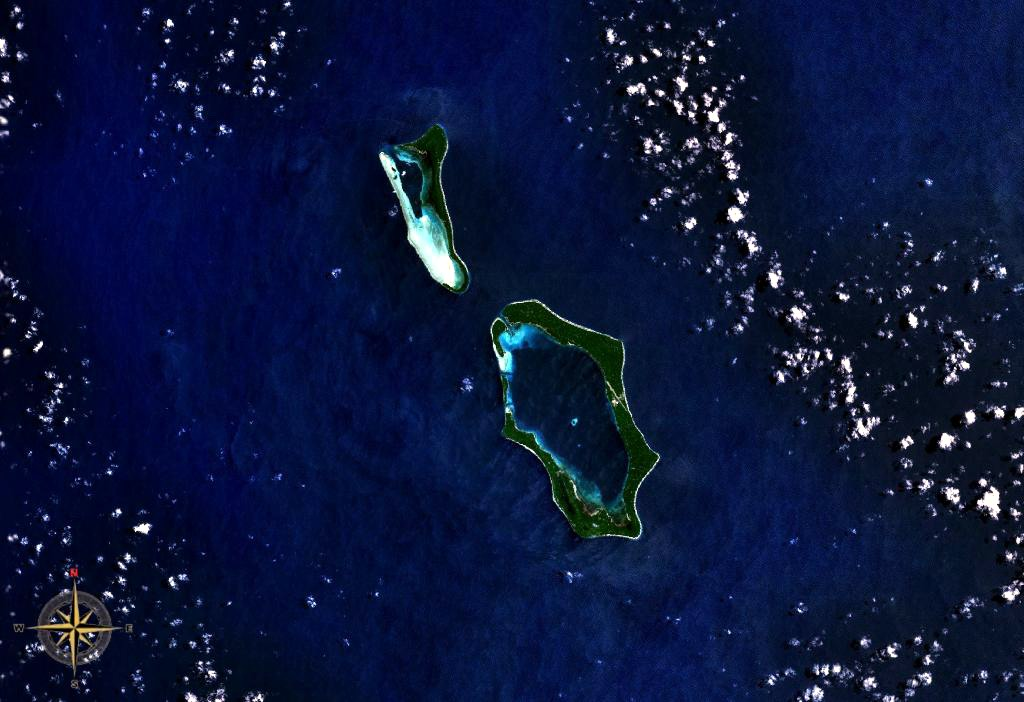
Green Islands seen from space. Oval-shaped Nissan Island is clearly visible in the center.

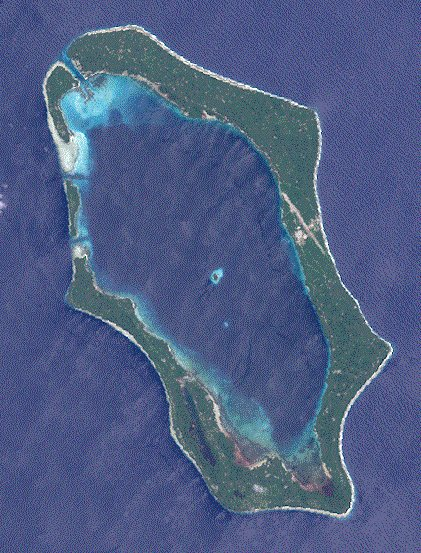
Nissan Island

Nissan Island (also Green Island or Sir Charles Hardy Island) is the largest of the Green Islands of Papua New Guinea. It is located at, about 200 km east of Rabaul on New Britain and about 200 km north-west of Bougainville. The island is administered under Nissan Rural LLG in the Autonomous Region of Bougainville. Nissan island, along with other nearby islands, has been described as a "stepping stone island" and it is believed that this island plays an important role in helping various plant and animal species spread throughout the region.

== History ==
Based upon pottery fragments discovered in archeological excavations researchers have determined that the inhabitants of this island commonly engaged in trade with the inhabitants of Buka Island. Commonly traded items would have included pigs, pottery, and shell money.

British and American whaling vessels visited the island in the nineteenth century for food, water and wood. The first on record was the Addison in 1837, and the last was Palmetto in 1881.

During World War II, in the Battle of the Green Islands, US and New Zealand troops recaptured several islands from heavily outnumbered Imperial Japanese forces. Following a daring reconnaissance mission on 31 January 1944 by New Zealand soldiers and Allied specialists, the New Zealand 3rd Division landed on Nissan Island on 15 February 1944. as part of the Solomon Islands campaign to isolate the Japanese stronghold at Rabaul. Shortly after the landings two airfields were constructed on the island. Richard Nixon was a supply officer on the base. There was also a PT boat base on another island nearby. There were approximately 17,000 allied troops on the island at that time. Much of the indigenous population was removed to Guadalcanal for about seven to nine months. After that time the front line had moved closer to Japan and the island was no longer needed in the war effort.

== Climate ==
Following a period of four months of drought, in February 2025 the Nissan Islanders appealed to the Autonomous Region of Bougainville for assistance. They also asked other people in Bougainville for food. Concern was also expressed about the potential for disease outbreaks, due to the lack of water on the island. In 2026 the situation would worsen further, with gardens destroyed by sea spray, causing many to go hungry.

== See also ==
- Nissan Rural LLG
