= Buka, Papua New Guinea =

Town of Bougainville

Buka
- Town
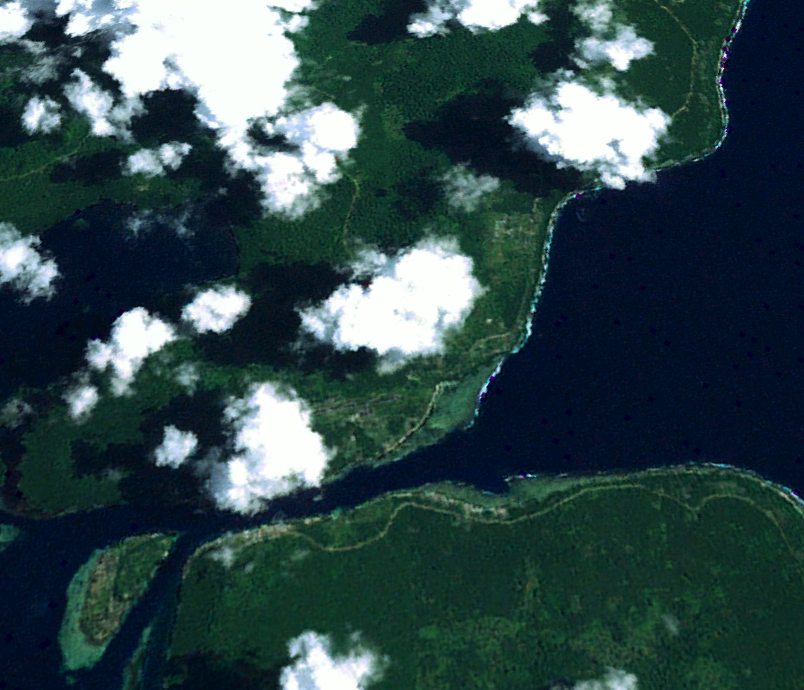
- Satellite image of Buka Township, with Sohano Island (Bottom left) and Buka Airport

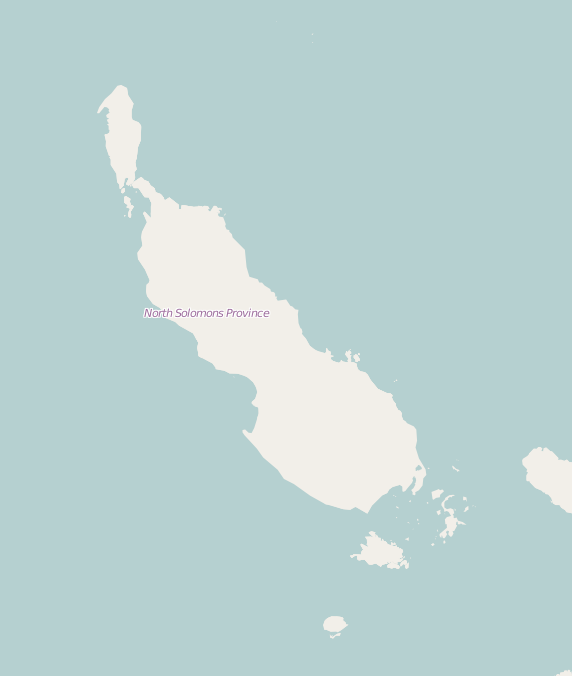
- Location in Bougainville Buka (Papua New Guinea)
- Coordinates: 5°25′19″S 154°40′22″E
- Country: Papua New Guinea
- Autonomous Region: Bougainville
- District: North Bougainville District
- LLG: Buka Rural LLG

Population
  - Total: 11,000
- approximately
- Time zone: UTC+11:00 (BST)
- Main languages: Nasioi and Rorovana
- Climate: Af

Buka is a town located on the southern coast of Buka Island, in the Autonomous Region of Bougainville, in eastern Papua New Guinea. It is administered under Buka Rural LLG. It is the capital of North Bougainville District and the interim capital of the Autonomous Region of Bougainville. It contains Our Lady of the Assumption Cathedral.

== Geography ==
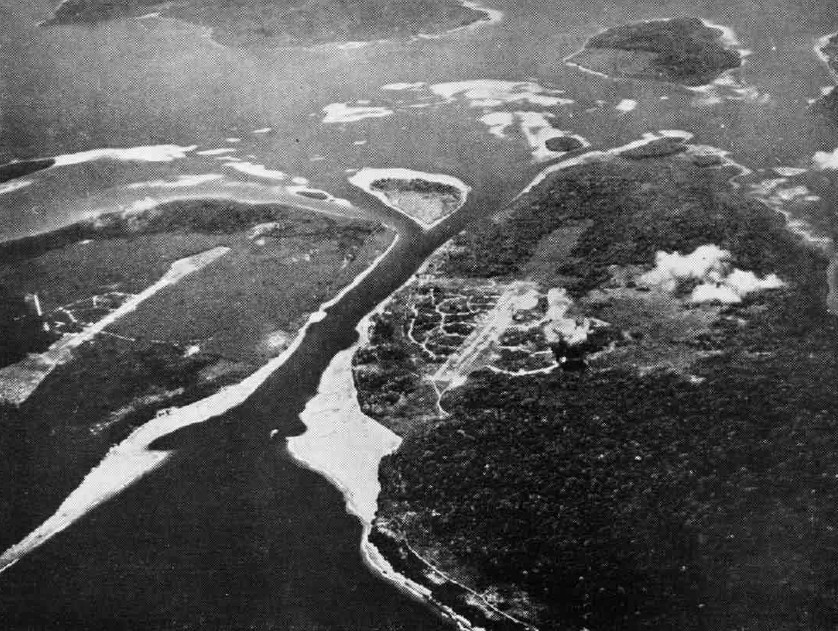
Buka Passage (1944)

The city and Buka Island are separated from the northern tip of Bougainville Island by the deep, narrow Buka Passage, which varies in width from 980 to 3,000 feet (300 to 1,070 metres). Both islands are in the northern Solomon Islands archipelago and the only major ones not within the nation of Solomon Islands.

Buka Island is volcanic formation measuring 35 miles by 9 miles (56 km by 14 km), with a total land area of 190 square miles (492 km²). The elevation reaches to 1,634 feet (498 metres) in the hills in the southwest, and the interior of the island is densely forested. Rainfall is abundant, with more than 100 inches (2,500 mm) annually. Coral reefs fringe the south and west coasts, the latter deeply indented by Queen Carola Harbour.

Buka consists of three major geological units: a plateau of uplifted coral reefs, steep hills and coral formations of post-Pleistocene age.

== History ==
Humans have lived on Buka for at least 28,000 years. Discovered by Europeans in 1768, the German Empire laid claim to the island in 1899, annexing it into German New Guinea.

In 1914, the region was seized by Australian troops amidst World War I. Between 1914 and 1975, the city was governed by Australia as the Territory of Papua. During this time, the Australian administration built Buka Airfield, which continues to be the city's primary airport.

Between 1942 and 1945, Buka was occupied by the Empire of Japan. Despite an Australian plan to destroy Buka Airfield, the airstrip remained in use by the Japanese occupiers throughout the war. In addition, the Japanese occupation built Bonis Airfield. Between 10 November 1943 and 10 June 1944, Buka Passage was attacked by the Allies 18 times. On 16 September 1945, Japanese forces formally surrendered.

Buka became the capital of the Bougainville Province during the 1990s Bougainville Civil War. The former, or "proper" capital of Bougainville, Arawa, was all but destroyed in 1990 as tensions reached a critical level in a civil uprising, which ended with the Bougainville Peace Agreement in 1998. The Bougainville government intends to return the capital to Arawa in the future.

== See also ==
- Buka Rural LLG
- Populated places in the Autonomous Region of Bougainville

== Citations ==
- Connell, John (2017). "Environmental Refugees? A tale of two resettlement projects in coastal Papua New Guinea". Australian Geographer. 48 (1): 79–95. Bibcode:2017AuGeo..48...79C. doi:10.1080/00049182.2016.1267603. S2CID 151425246.
