= Ralston, Washington =

Unincorporated community in Washington, US

- Unincorporated community
- Location within Washington (state)
- Coordinates: 46°59′02″N 118°21′05″W
- Country: United States
- State: Washington
- County: Adams
- Established: 1908
- Elevation: 1,663 ft (507 m)
- Time zone: UTC-8 (Pacific (PST))
  - Summer (DST): UTC-7 (PDT)
- ZIP code: 99169
- Area code: 509
- GNIS feature ID: 1511248

Ralston is an unincorporated community in Adams County, Washington, United States. Ralston is assigned the ZIP code 99169.

A post office called Ralston was established in 1908, and remained in operation until 1974. The community took its name from the food.
