= Poncelet's giant rat =

Conservation status
- Critically Endangered (IUCN 3.1)

Scientific classification
- Kingdom: Animalia
- Phylum: Chordata
- Class: Mammalia
- Order: Rodentia
- Family: Muridae
- Genus: Solomys
- Species: S. ponceleti

Binomial name
- Solomys ponceleti (Troughton, 1935)

Species of rodent

Poncelet's giant rat or Poncelet's naked-tailed rat (Solomys ponceleti) is a species of rodent in the family Muridae. It is found on Bougainville Island, part of Papua New Guinea, and nearby Choiseul Island in the Solomon Islands.
