= Leo Hannett =

Bougainville playwright, journalist and politician (1941 - 2018)

Leo Hannett CMG

Premier, North Solomons Province
- In office 1980–1984

Member, National Parliament of Papua New Guinea
- In office 21 February 2006 – 2007

Member, Bougainville House of Representatives
- In office 2010–2015

Personal details
- Born: 17 July 1941 Nissan Island, Territory of New Guinea
- Died: 18 June 2018 (aged 76)
- Spouse: Elizabeth Korinai Hannett
- Children: 4
- Education: University of Papua New Guinea; University of Hawaiʻi

Leo Hannett (17 July 1941 – 18 June 2018) was a Bougainvillean and Black Power activist, playwright, journalist and politician who played a significant role in Papua New Guinea's anti-colonial struggle and movements for the autonomy and independence of Bougainville. He was regarded as Bougainville's "most important secessionist leader of the 1970s."

== Early life ==
Hannett was born on 17 July 1941 in Nissan Island within the Australian-administered Territory of New Guinea, shortly before the Japanese occupation of New Guinea. Evacuated to the Solomon Islands during World War Two, he returned with his father and two brothers, his mother having died while in the Solomons.

== Politics ==
Hannett was one of a group of Bougainvillean students living in the territorial capital of Port Moresby who in 1968 called for a referendum to be held on Bougainville's future. He served as the group's spokesman and issued a statement requesting a vote by 1970 "to decide whether Bougainville should be independent, should unite with the Solomon Islands to constitute a separate unit, or should remain with PNG".

In 1969, the Australia Party sponsored Hannett to undertake a four-state speaking tour in Australia, at the invitation of party leader Reg Turnbull. Interviewed by The Sydney Morning Herald he declared himself committed to non-violence and cited his influences as James Baldwin, Tom Mboya, Dag Hammarskjöld and Mahatma Gandhi.

In 1973, PNG chief minister Michael Somare asked Hannett to chair the Bougainville Special Political Committee. The committee comprised 36 local leaders and was tasked with gauging public opinion on Bougainville's political future, with a report to be delivered to the Constitutional Planning Committee chaired by John Momis. Hannett made clandestine visits to Honiara around the same time, exploring the possibility of Bougainville's union with the Solomon Islands.

In September 1975, following dissatisfaction with proposals for PNG's new constitution related to the distribution of profits from the Panguna mine, Hannett joined with others in Bougainville in proclaiming the unilateral declaration of independence of the Republic of the North Solomons.

In 2006, Hannett was elected to the national parliament in a by-election for the provincial seat of Bougainville. He served as Parliamentary Secretary to the Prime Minister and Chair of the Public Accounts Committee. As the sitting member, he unsuccessfully sought re-election at the 2007 general election, coming second with 23.04% of the vote.

Between 2010 and 2015, Hannett served in two ministries in the Autonomous Bougainville Government: Minister of Police and Minister for Public Services.

Following his death, the National Parliament observed a moment of silence in respect on 17 July 2018.
