= North Bougainville District =

- District

- Location within Papua New Guinea
- Coordinates: 5°25′S 154°40′E
- Country: Papua New Guinea
- Regions: Bougainville
- Capital: Buka

Area
  - Total: 3,007 km^{2} (1,161 sq mi)

Population (2011 census)
  - Total: 109,023
  - Density: 36.26/km^{2} (93.90/sq mi)
- Time zone: UTC+11 (BST)

North Bougainville District is a district of the Autonomous Region of Bougainville of Papua New Guinea. Its capital is Buka on Buka Island. North Bougainville languages are spoken in the district.

== Local-level governments ==
- Atolls Rural
- Buka Rural
- Kunua Rural
- Nissan Rural
- Selau-Suir Rural
- Tinputz Rural
