= Selau/Suir Rural LLG =

Local-level government in Papua New Guinea

- Country: Papua New Guinea
- Province: Autonomous Region of Bougainville
- District: North Bougainville District

Population (2011 census)
  - Total: 15,141
- Time zone: UTC+10 (AEST)

Selau/Suir Rural LLG is a local-level government (LLG) of the Autonomous Region of Bougainville, Papua New Guinea.

== Wards ==
- 01. Sorom
- 02. Hantoa
- 03. Siara
- 04. Rapoma
- 05. Suir Coastal
- 06. Suir Inland
