= Lap-lap =

Cloth worn around the waits or loins

A lap-lap is a waistcloth or loincloth worn in Papua New Guinea and the South Pacific. This item of clothing has three parts: a front flap, a back flap, and a thread to tie them around the waist. The sides are generally open. How much is covered by the front and back flaps varies.

Related to the lap-lap is the lava-lava, which is an all-round rectangular cloth worn like a kilt or skirt by Polynesians.

This description refers to the traditional, pre-colonial period, costume. The current usage is broader than this: 'Laplap: a waistcloth, a loincloth, any cloth material or dry goods, a rag'. It is a Fijian word that is also used in Western Melanesia.{op. cit., p. 120}
