= Hahalis Welfare Society =

Organization

- Formation: 1960
- Founder: John Teosin, Francis Hagai
- Dissolved: 1980s
- Type: movement
- Legal status: in decline
- Purpose: anti-tax
- Location: Buka Island, Papua New Guinea

The Hahalis Welfare Society was a nativist movement on Buka Island in what is now the Autonomous Region of Bougainville in Papua New Guinea. The movement began in 1960 and was most active in the '60s and '70s. At its peak, the Society numbered half of the population of Buka Island as members. The Society is best known for refusing to pay the Head Tax to the colonial government of the time, the Australian-administered Territory of Papua and New Guinea based in Port Moresby, and its subsequent clash with police in 1962.

While the Society was mainly focused on anti-tax activism, the Port Moresby Administration classified it as a cargo cult. Former Police Inspector John Hihina described the Society this way: "In 1962 we had trouble at Hahalis on Buka Island, where John Teosin, Francis Bagai[sic], and the old Sawa started a cargo cult. About 2,000 members joined in and the situation was rather awkward".

== History ==
The Hahalis Welfare Society was formed in 1960 by Catholics John Teosin and Francis Hagai. Initially, the movement was a breakaway from the East Coast Buka Society, which had been established for several years. Teosin and Hagai founded the Society on the principles of communal farming and self-help. They started the Society as a means to get the government to aid the Halia people, by building a school on the island. When this did not happen, the Halia people became unhappy, and became convinced that they no longer owed the government anything, if the government was not going to help them.

Heavy taxes imposed on the Halia people by the colonial government caused tension on Buka Island. These tensions came to a head in 1962, culminating in the Hahalis Welfare Society Rebellion.

=== Hahalis Welfare Society Rebellion ===
The Society was upset at the Head Tax imposed on them by the Port Moresby Administration, believing they weren't getting their fair share of the benefits from the tax. As a group, the Society vowed to pay the tax to their organisation, rather than the Port Moresby Administration. The Port Moresby Administration responded in February 1962. They recruited 500 police officers from throughout Papua New Guinea. When the police officers were flown to Buka, they faced off against a crowd of 1,000 Society members, including men, women, and children. The ensuing confrontation ended with the injury of 40 Society followers and 25 police officers, as well as the arrests of Teosin, Hagai, and nearly 600 Society members. Following the mass arrest, many supporters were released on appeal, after which the Society agreed to begin paying the tax again. Tensions eased at that point, and the government left the Society alone afterward.

In 1975 Society membership numbered half the population of Buka Island, which was 25,000 at the time. That same year, the Society supported Bougainville separatism. After secession, the Society supported the provincial government into the 1980s.

== Sources ==
- Evans, Geoffrey Russell; Goodman, James; Lansbury, Nina, eds. (2002). Moving Mountains: Communities Confront Mining and Globalization. Zed Books. ISBN 184277199X.
- May, Ronald James (2004). State and Society in Papua New Guinea: The First Twenty-five Years. ANU E Press. ISBN 192094205X.
- Swatridge, Colin (1985). Delivering the Goods: Education as Cargo in Papua New Guinea. Manchester University Press. ISBN 0719017785.
