= Buka Island =

Island of Papua New Guinea

Coordinates: 5°15′S 154°38′E

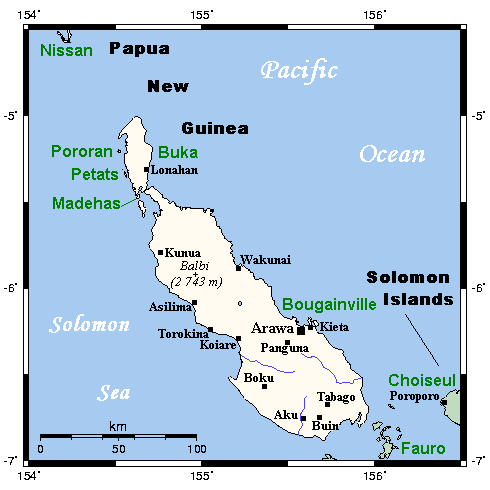
Buka Island is to the north of Bougainville Island

Buka Island is the second-largest island in the Autonomous Region of Bougainville, in eastern Papua New Guinea. It is in Buka Rural LLG of North Bougainville District, with the Autonomous Region's and district's capital city of Buka on the island.

The island is separated by the narrow Buka Passage from the northwestern coast of Bougainville Island, and has an area of approximately 500 km^{2} (190 sq mi). Buka, Bougainville Island and the Tabar Islands and their surrounding waters are identified as being part of the Solomon Archipelago terrestrial ecoregion and marine ecoregion.

== History ==
Canoe of the Island of Buka

Buka was first occupied by humans in the Paleolithic period, with evidence for human habitation at Kilu Cave some 30,000 years ago.

British, Australian and American whaling ships visited the island in the nineteenth century for food, water and wood. The first on record was the Eliza in 1806, and the last known visit was by the Palmetto in 1881.

The present inhabitants speak languages that are from the eastward push of Austronesian languages of the Lapita Culture complex, some 2,700 years ago.

In 1899 the German Empire laid claim to the island, annexing it into German New Guinea.

=== World War II ===
Buka Island was occupied by Japanese troops during World War II, and it was the site of important Japanese airfields that were considered strategic by the Allies.

Although the island was bombed by allied air forces and warships, Allied armies never fought in Buka. After holding out for years on poor supplies, the Japanese surrendered in 1945 when Allied troops were approaching the Selau peninsula on nearby Bougainville.

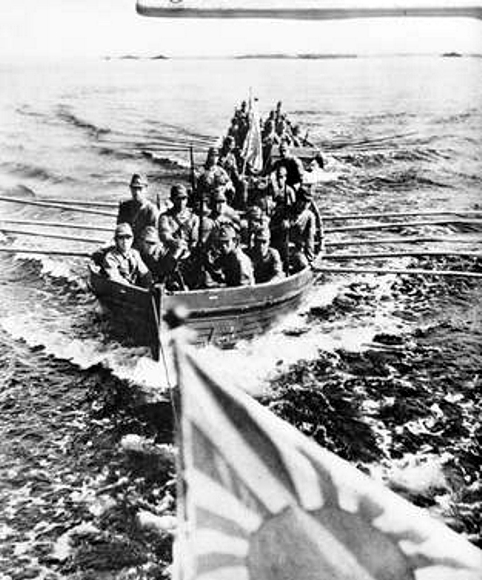
Japanese troops occupying Buka Island in 1942

USS Cleveland (CL-55) shelling Japanese airfields on Buka Island, 24 December 1943

== Economy ==
The economy of Buka can be divided into a very small urban component and the village sector. The village sector is characterised by subsistence farming, primarily of sweet potato as a staple food, and the production of copra and cocoa as cash crops by family-sized units and small cooperative work groups. Vanilla and tropical spice crops have made a halting progress, and remain very minor sources of income for villagers.

The urban sector at Buka Passage includes the Bougainville representatives of major New Guinean business, such as Bank South Pacific, CPL (which purchases cash crops), Agmark, presence of the Autonomous Bougainville Government, which is based in Kubu, near Buka Passage. There are a number of small businesses in the island.

Buka Airport is the principal airport in the Bougainville area. It has scheduled service to Rabaul, Lae, and Port Moresby.

== Geography ==
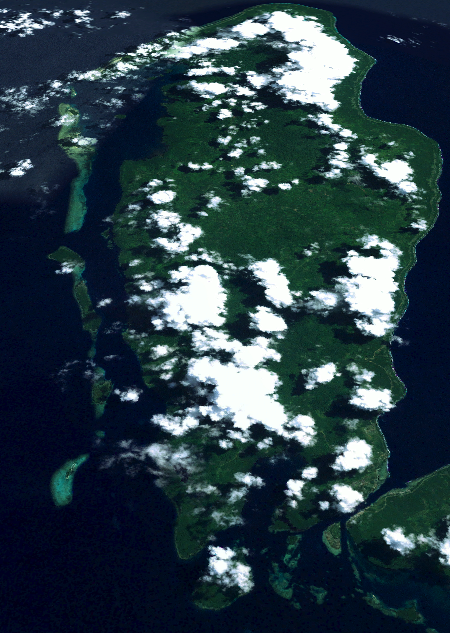
Buka Island from Space

Buka is a relatively flat island some 52 kilometres (32 miles) long in the north–south axis, and up to 18 kilometres (11 miles) wide in the west–east axis. It is separated from Bougainville by the Buka Passage, a narrow, deep and very fast-flowing tidal channel about 200 metres (660 feet) wide. The east coast is the windward side for most of the year, and has a coastal cliff that rises close to the ocean, leaving only a narrow and often rocky beach. A coral reef rings the entire island; it is narrow on the east coast, which is battered by oceanic winds and large waves; it spreads out into lagoons on the west coast.

Along the western coast there is a small mountain range, named the Richard Parkinson Range, after the German-Danish planter and explorer. The highest peak in this range is Mt. Bei, which is 458 metres (1,503 feet) in elevation. The range runs between Buka and Carola Harbour. The few larger rivers on the island flow from headwaters in the range's interior. The largest is the Gagan River.

The rest of the island is a large raised limestone formation. It rises 10 metres (33 ft) inland, and 70–100 metres (230–330 ft) along the cliffs at the eastern coast. The cliffs correspond to the reef of an ancient lagoon.

The limestone morphology means that there is very little surface water available throughout most of the island. This poses a problem for the island's residents, especially during the dry season, when water is collected by villagers from "kukubui" springs along the foot of the cliffs.

=== Subdivisions ===
The island is divided into five Autonomous Bougainville Government electorates:

- Haku
- Peit (covering the West Coast and Solos)
- Halia (from Tohatsi to Hahalis),
- Hagogohe (from Salasa to Sing)
- Tsitalato (from Lonahan to Buka Passage).

Each of these electorates has its own local government, known as Councils of Elders.

Buka is the main city on Buka Island, and the present-day capital of the Autonomous Region of Bougainville. It is located on the northern coast of Buka Passage. On old maps it is named "Chinatown". The land the city occupies was formally known as Leta. There has been considerable expansion of the city in recent years, and also in nearby Kubu, location of the Autonomous Bougainville Government Parliament, and Hutjena, the location of the national high school serving Buka.

== Language and ethnic groups ==
The main island of Buka is occupied by two distinct language groups, Solos and Halia. The latter is split into two dialects in Buka Island: Hanahan Halia spoken along the east coast from Buka Passage (known locally as Ieta) to Tohatsi and Haku, spoken in the north coast villages from Elutupan to Lontis. A third dialect of Halia, known as Selau is spoken in the peninsula of the same name in north Bougainville. Halia and Haku speakers easily understand each other, Selau is a more distant dialect. Solos is a distinct language within the North Bougainvillean Austronesian family, and Halia and Solos are not mutually intelligible.

On the west coast of Buka there are five small inhabited islands that have close cultural and linguistic ties to the main island of Buka. From north to south these are Pororan and nearby Hitau, Petats and Yamen and Matsungan. The language of these islands is distinct from Halia and Solos, but resembles Halia more closely than it does Solos. This language is referred to as Petats in the linguistic literature, and as West Coast in Buka.

== Culture and customs ==
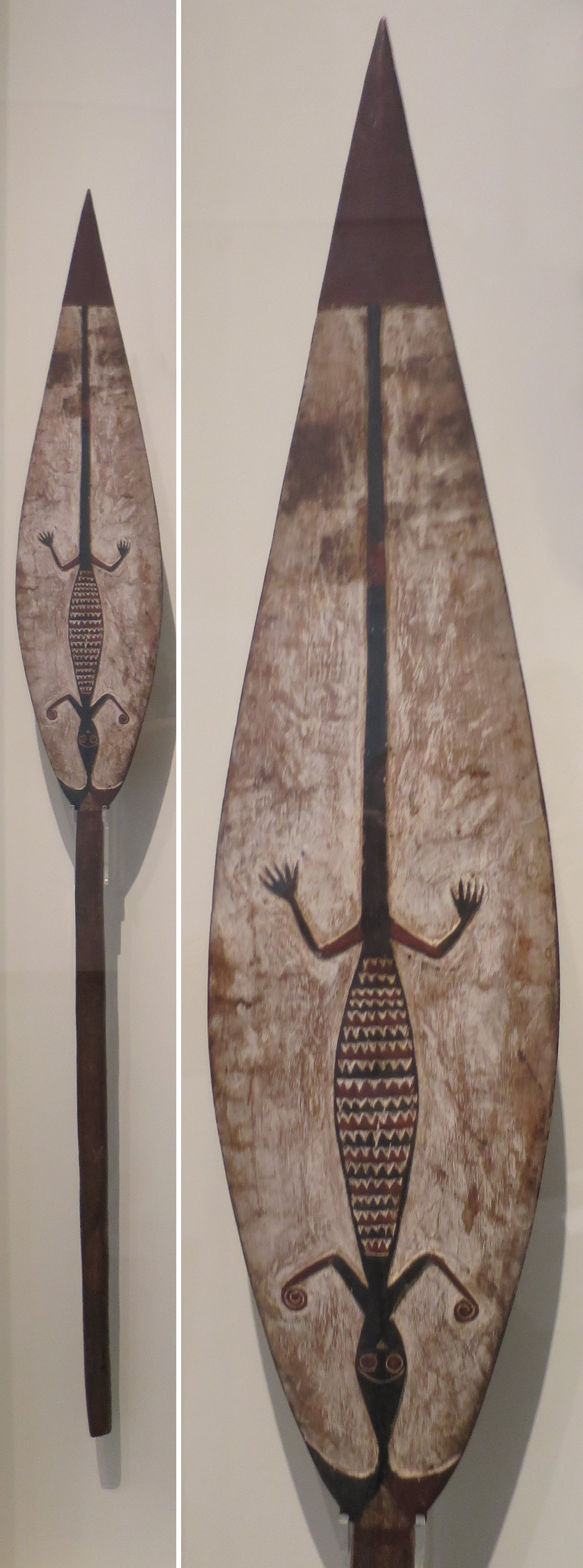
A painted canoe paddle of Buka Island

Although separated into three or four different language groups, Buka society shows very similar traits throughout the island. Traditional Buka society conformed to a broad pattern of Melanesian horticultural organisation. Coastal (or "tasi" – beach) villagers, namely the Haku, Halia and West Coast speakers, planted taro, kept chickens, fished and collected shellfish. The Solos fished in Buka's rivers and traded forest products and taro with the Halia and West Coast islanders. As in most Pacific Islands, pigs were, and still are, extremely important and are seldom eaten except in the course of rituals and formal feasts. The cuscus (a type of marsupial) and various birds also supplement the diet.

Descent is matrilineal and the kinship terminology is based on a Hawaiian system. Buka kinship does not prescribe a post-marital residence, but it is generally preferred that a young couple live first with the husband's maternal relatives, and later move to the wife's land. The reason for this is that though a man will require assistance from his clansfolk, his children belong to his wife's clan.

=== Chiefs ===
There are inherited positions of authority for men, or chieftainships called tsunono (in Halia, or close cognates in the other languages). Women can also be "chiefs", known as teitahol in Halia and tuhikauu in Haku. Traditionally, women chiefs have little overt authority, although they are extremely well respected. Women have a sacred value, rather than secular power. This is changing somewhat under the influence of NGOs and also because of women's leadership role in the peace movement during the Bougainville Civil War.

Although tsunono are in theory genealogically determined, in practice the rule is often broken. If a man is not a good speaker, or if his brother is an exceptional one, the body of tsunono can recognise him as a "mausman" (spokesman in Tok Pisin) or tsonpepeito (guardian in Halia).

Tsunono do not wield arbitrary power. They must represent the interests of their clan. Although the clan cannot (easily) remove a tsunono if he fails to do this, they can make it very difficult for him to mobilise the land and labour resources required to be an effective political agent.

Each sub-clan has its own clan house, known as a tsuhana. These buildings are extremely important in Buka political organisation, they are public buildings in which feasts are conducted for funerals, memorials and reconciliations. Typically, a clan or village will meet to discuss political affairs within the tsuhana. Large wooden slit-gongs are kept there, and struck to call meetings, announce funerals, deaths and other village events.

Tsuhana are associated with the body of the tsunono. Striking the post of a tsuhana in anger is said to be equivalent to assaulting the chief, and requires expiation by the sacrifice of a pig. The construction of a tsuhana is an elaborate process, though the actual building is usually quite humble. Each step in the construction requires the sacrifice of pigs, and this in turn requires mobilisation of the sub-clan and its allies. A tsuhana must be built for a tsunono chief to be regarded as powerful and authoritative.

In general, tsunono and tsuhana have authority over a sub-clan, or hamlet sized territory encompassing between five and twenty nuclear families. There is, however, a hierarchy of tsunono. Typically several tsuhana will combine under the leadership of a preeminent clan, and the leader of this clan will be called tsunono mal. This relationship is not irrevocable, and requires the assent of other tsunono. It is not possible, or at least it is not easy, for a tsunono to conquer and force other tsuhana to submit to his own.

The most powerful chief is called munihil. This chief has in theory power over clans of a moiety class in a district encompassing perhaps several villages. Such a chief will not be the largest and most powerful landholder, and will rarely have a strong genealogical claim over all the villages. Sometimes such a chief will not even be a local, but a preeminent leader drawn from a distant area. His claim to leadership is not his own, but derives from the collective agreement of the tsunono who "put him forward" so that he can represent them.

=== Moiety classes and clans ===
In all Buka societies there are four moiety classes – Nakaripa, Naboen, Nakas and Natasi. Nakaripa and Naboen are represented by totemic emblems, the fowl and the eagle, while Nakas is represented by a dog and there is no consensus as to the totem of Natasi, but kotoiana, a kind of sea hawk, is often suggested, along with pue, the froth of the sea break. Nakaripa and Naboen are prestige classes and the overwhelming majority of the population will claim to belong to one or the other, even if they are genealogically members of the low prestige classes Nakas and Natasi. Traditionally, the latter carried out the prestige classes' dirty work; more recently these groups have become independent ('bruklus') and assert themselves as "clans in their own right".

While Buka will call their moiety categories "clans" in Tok Pisin and English, this is not sociologically accurate and the word is actually used in two different senses, corresponding to what anthropologists would recognise as moieties and clans. (This is also a feature of the Halia language, the Halia term in question is pinaposa.) There are clans, which trace common descent and will occasionally act as corporate entities. These clans are land-holding groups, though often clans will be represented by sub-clans in different villages, or even in different linguistic areas.

By contrast, the moiety classes encompass many different clans. Moiety classification is important in conflict resolution and in the organisation of authority. For a man to succeed his mother's brother as tsunono, the "opposite" moiety (always either Nakaripa or Naboen) will hatsunono (make tsunono). During reconciliation ceremonies, the "opposite" moiety will make speeches setting conditions on the reconciling parties and will preside over sacrifices.

=== Contemporary religion ===
Today the overwhelming majority of Buka are Christians, divided into a Roman Catholic majority and a large minority of United Church (Methodist), as well as many different Pentecostal and evangelical sects.

=== Social and religious movements ===
Buka is famous in the anthropological literature as the site of a large and militant social movement called the Hahalis Welfare Society, led by John Teosin and Francis Hagai, as well as several other political and religious movements. These are often termed "cargo cults" by their opponents, although the utility of this term is a matter of dispute amongst anthropologists and historians of the Pacific.

== Notable residents ==
- Francis Hagai (d. 1974), political activist
- Moses Havini (d. 2015), political activist and independence campaigner, co-designer of the flag of Bougainville
- Justin Kili, journalist
- Somuk (d. 1965), artist and figure in art brut
