= Torokina =

Coordinates: 6.23333°S 155.05°E

Torokina is a coastal village on Bougainville Island, in the Autonomous Region of Bougainville, eastern Papua New Guinea. It is administered under Torokina Rural LLG.

It is located on the western coast of the island.

During World War II, it was the site of Torokina Airfield.
