= Autonomous Region of Bougainville =

Autonomous region of Papua New Guinea

Bougainville Bogenvil North Solomon Islands
- Autonomous region
- Autonomous Region of Bougainville; Otonomos Rijen bilong Bogenvil
- Flag Emblem
- Motto: "Peace, Unity, Prosperity"
- Anthem: "My Bougainville"
- Location within Papua New Guinea
- Country: Papua New Guinea
- Autonomy: 25 June 2002
- Voted for independence: 7 December 2019
- Capital: Buka; 6°0′S 155°0′E
- Largest city: Arawa
- Official languages: English, Tok Pisin Regional languages: Askopan; Bannoni; Daantanaiʼ; Hahon; Hakö; Halia; Koromira; Lawunuia; Naasioi; Nagovisi; Nehan; Nukumanu; Nukuria; Ounge; Papapana; Petats; Ramopa; Rapoisi; Rotokas; Saposa; Simeku; Siwai; Solos; Takuu; Teop; Terei; Tinputz; Torau; Uisai
- Demonym(s): Bougainvillean

Government
  - President: Ishmael Toroama
  - Vice-President: Ezekiel Massat
- Legislature: House of Representatives

Area
  - Total: 9,384 km^{2} (3,623 sq mi)

Population
  - 2024 census: 367,093
  - Density: 26.5/km^{2} (68.6/sq mi)
- HDI (2023): ▲0.614 medium
- Currency: Papua New Guinean kina (PGK)
- Time zone: UTC+11:00 (Bougainville Standard Time)
- Driving side: left
- Calling code: +695
- ISO 3166 code: BGV
- Internet TLD: .gv

Bougainville (/ˈboʊɡənvɪl/, BOH-gən-vil; Tok Pisin: Bogenvil), officially the Autonomous Region of Bougainville (Tok Pisin: Otonomos Rijen bilong Bogenvil), is an autonomous region in Papua New Guinea. The largest island is Bougainville Island, while the region also includes Buka Island and a number of outlying islands and atolls. The provisional capital is Buka, on Buka Island.

In 2024, the region had a population of 367,093 people. The lingua franca of Bougainville is Tok Pisin, while a variety of Austronesian and non-Austronesian languages are also spoken. The region includes several Polynesian outliers where Polynesian languages are spoken. Geographically, the islands of Bougainville and Buka form part of the Solomon Islands archipelago, but they are politically separate from the independent country of Solomon Islands. Historically, Bougainville and Buka, together with the islands of Choiseul, Santa Isabel, the Shortlands, and Ontong Java, which are all now part of the country of Solomon Islands, formed the German Solomon Islands Protectorate, the geographical area later being referred to as the North Solomon Islands.

Bougainville has been inhabited by humans for at least 29,000 years. During the colonial period, the region was occupied and administered by the Germans, Australians and Japanese for various periods. The name of the region originates from French admiral Louis Antoine de Bougainville, who reached it in 1768.

Bougainvillean separatism dates to the 1960s, and the Republic of the North Solomons was declared shortly before the independence of Papua New Guinea in 1975; it was subsumed into Papua New Guinea the following year. Conflict over the Panguna mine became the primary trigger for the Bougainville Civil War (1988–1998), which resulted in the deaths of up to 20,000 people. A peace agreement resulted in the creation of the Autonomous Bougainville Government.

In late 2019, a non-binding independence referendum was held with 98% voting for independence rather than continued autonomy within Papua New Guinea. As a result, the regional authorities intend to become independent by 2027, pending ratification by the Papua New Guinean government. If ratified, the capital may relocate from Buka back to the previous location of Arawa. In March 2025, the Bougainville Independence Leaders Consultation Forum recommended 1 September 2027 as the date of independence, a date later revised in July 2026 to 1 September 2030.

== History ==
=== Prehistory ===
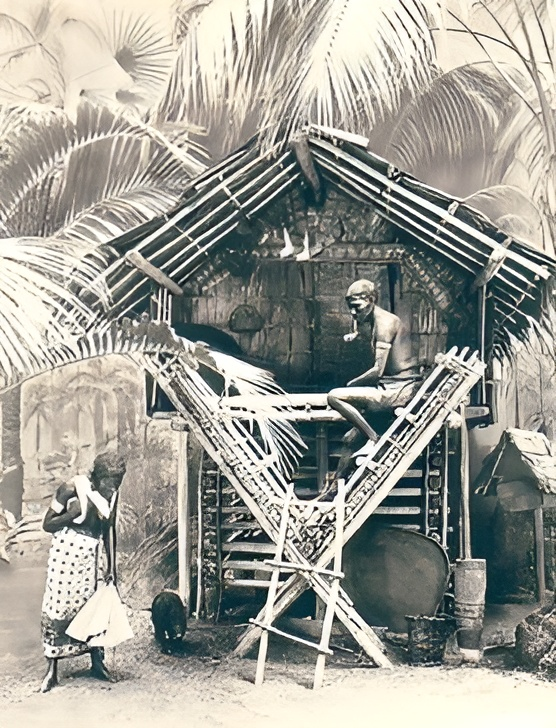
Replica of a traditional stake-house built by men from Toboroi, Bougainville Island

Bougainville has been inhabited by humans for at least 29,000 years, according to evidence obtained from Kilu Cave on Buka Island. Until about 10,000 years ago, during the Last Glacial Maximum, there was a single island referred to as "Greater Bougainville" that spanned from the northern tip of Buka Island to the Nggela Islands north of Guadalcanal.

The first inhabitants of Bougainville were Australo-Melanesians who presumably arrived from the Bismarck Archipelago. Around 3000 years ago, Austronesian peoples brought the Lapita culture to the islands, introducing pottery, agriculture, and domesticated animals such as pigs, dogs, and chickens. Both Austronesian and non-Austronesian languages are spoken on the islands to this day, however, there has been significant mixing between the populations to the point that cultural and genetic differences are no longer correlated with language.

=== Colonial history ===
The first Europeans to sight present-day Bougainville were the Dutch explorers Willem Schouten and Jacob Le Maire, who glimpsed Takuu Atoll and Nissan Island in 1616. British naval officer Philip Carteret saw Buka Island in 1767 and also visited the islands that were later named in his honour. In 1768, French admiral Louis Antoine de Bougainville sailed along the east coast of the island that now bears his name.

==== German administration ====
The German Empire, which had already begun operations in New Guinea, annexed present-day Bougainville in 1886, after agreeing with the United Kingdom to divide the Solomon Islands archipelago between them. A German protectorate over the northern islands was established later that year, but the British Solomon Islands Protectorate was not established until 1893. The initial boundary between the two territories was much more southerly, with Choiseul Island, Santa Isabel Island, Ontong Java, the Shortland Islands, and part of the Florida Islands included in the German section. The current boundary between Papua New Guinea and Solomon Islands is derived from the Tripartite Convention of 1899, which saw those islands ceded to the United Kingdom.

The German Solomon Islands were administered through German New Guinea, although it took almost two decades for an administrative presence to be established. The German administrative station at Kieta, established in 1905, was preceded by a Marist mission, which succeeded in converting a majority of the islanders to Catholicism. The first fully commercial plantation was established in 1908, but German annexation had little economic impact.

==== Australian administration ====
The Australian Naval and Military Expeditionary Force occupied Bougainville in December 1914, as part of the Australian occupation of German New Guinea. The 1919 Treaty of Versailles established the former colony as a League of Nations mandate, administered by Australia as the Territory of New Guinea. A civilian administration was established in 1920, after which German nationals were deported and their property expropriated. A number of punitive expeditions took place during both the German and Australian administrations, as part of "pacification" programs. The colonial period saw significant changes in the culture of the islanders.

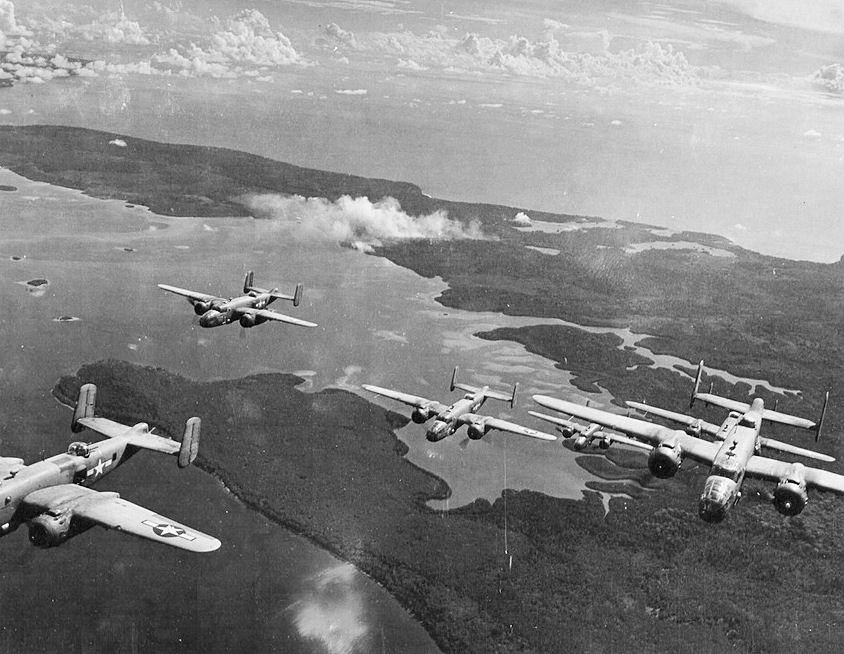
American B-25 Mitchell bombers from the 42nd Bombardment Group over the Selay Peninsula of Bougainville, 1944

In 1942, Bougainville was invaded by the Japanese in order to provide a support base for the operations elsewhere in the South-West Pacific. The Allied counter-invasion resulted in heavy casualties, beginning in 1943, with full control of the islands not re-established until 1945. After the war the Australian government incorporated Bougainville and the rest of the mandate into the Territory of Papua and New Guinea, the immediate predecessor of present-day Papua New Guinea.

=== Modern history ===
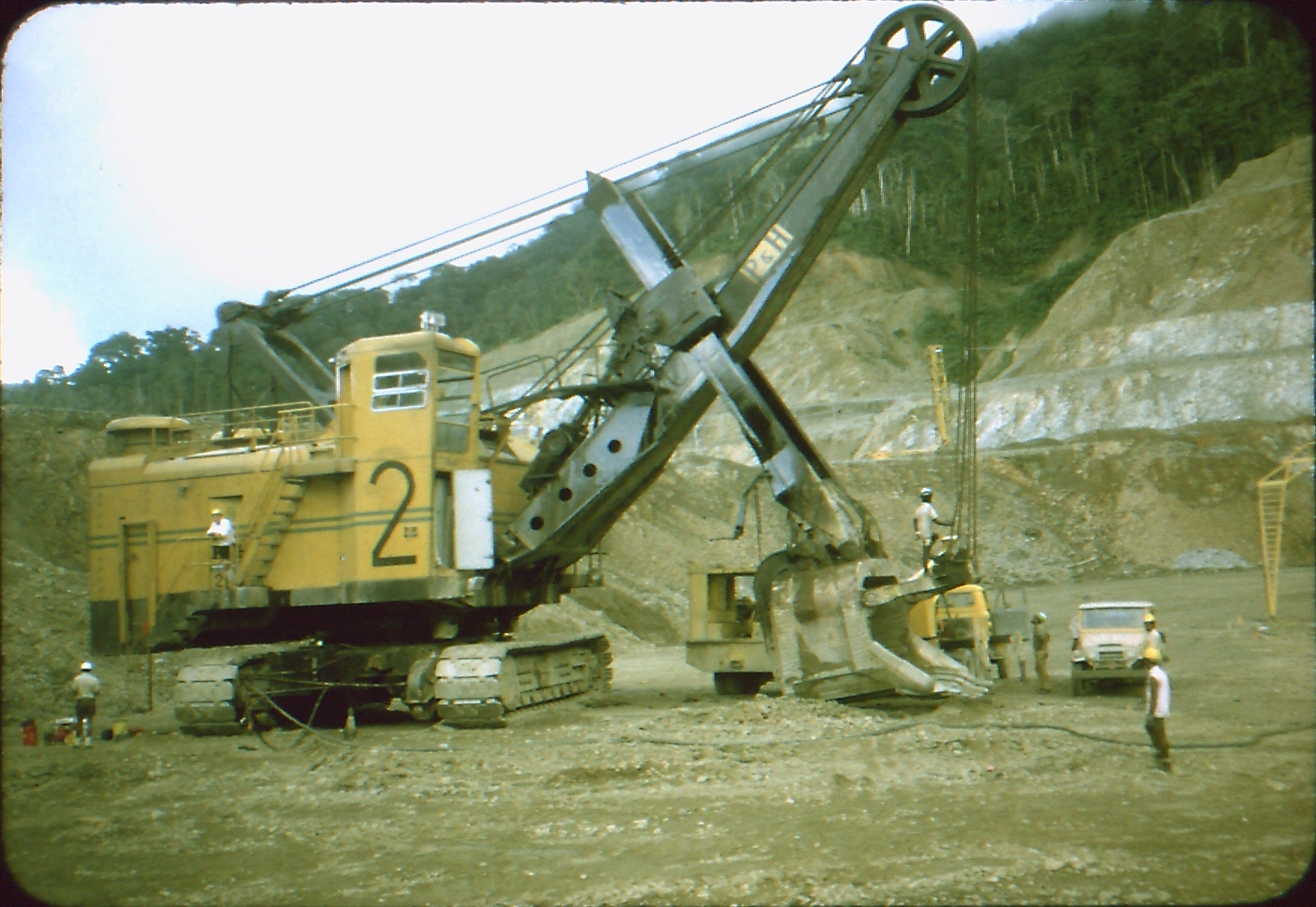
Shovel undergoing service Panguna mine overburden, c. 1971

Papua New Guinea gained its independence from Australia in 1975. As Bougainville is rich in copper and gold, a large mine had been established at Panguna in the early 1970s by Bougainville Copper, a subsidiary of Rio Tinto. Disputes by regional residents with the company over adverse environmental impacts, failure to share financial benefits, and negative social changes brought by the mine resulted in a local revival for a secessionist movement that had been dormant. Activists proclaimed the independence of Bougainville (Republic of North Solomons) in 1975 and in 1990, but both times central government forces suppressed the democratic independence movement.

==== Civil war ====
In 1988, the Bougainville Revolutionary Army (BRA) increased their activity significantly. Prime Minister Sir Rabbie Namaliu ordered the Papua New Guinea Defence Force (PNGDF) to put down the rebellion, and the conflict escalated into a civil war. The PNGDF retreated from permanent positions on Bougainville in 1990 but continued military action. The conflict involved pro-independence and loyalist Bougainvillean groups as well as the PNGDF. The war claimed an estimated 15,000 to 20,000 lives.

In 1996, Prime Minister Sir Julius Chan made the controversial move to hire Sandline International, a private military company previously involved in supplying mercenaries in the civil war in Sierra Leone, to put down the rebellion.

==== Peace agreement and autonomy ====
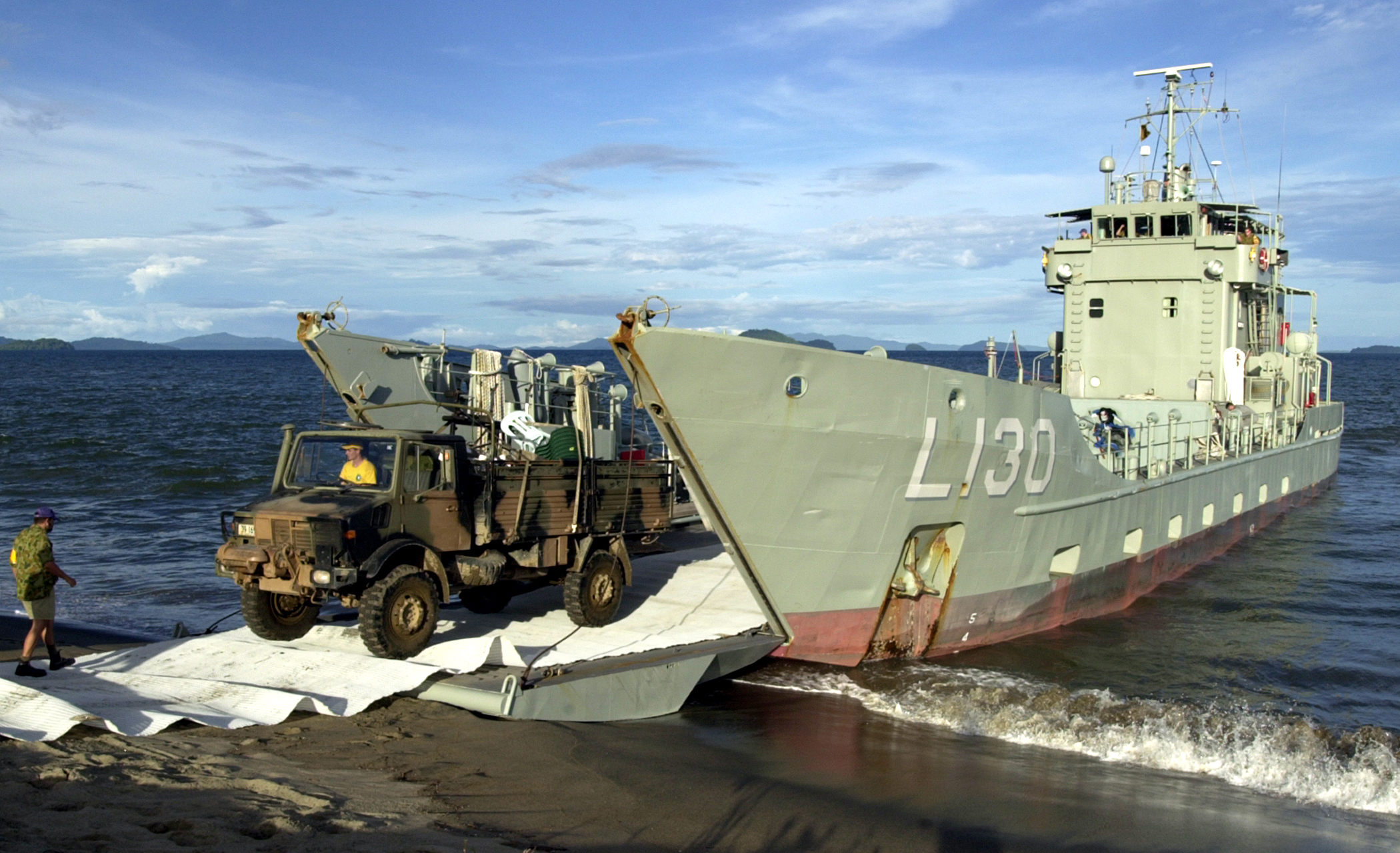
HMAS Wewak unloading an Australian Army truck during Operation Bel Isi

The Bougainville conflict ended in 1997 after negotiations brokered by New Zealand. In 2000, A peace agreement was completed and, together with disarmament, provided for the establishment of an Autonomous Bougainville Government. The parties agreed to have a referendum in the future on whether the island should become politically independent.

On 25 July 2005, rebel leader Francis Ona died after a short illness. A former surveyor with Bougainville Copper, Ona was a key figure in the secessionist conflict and had refused to formally join the island's peace process.

In 2015, Australia announced it would establish a diplomatic post in Bougainville for the first time. In 2016, it cancelled those plans acknowledging that it had not obtained the PNG government's approval.

==== Independence referendum ====
In 2019, a non-binding independence referendum was held with 98.3% voting for independence rather than continued autonomy within Papua New Guinea. As a result, the regional authorities intended to become independent between 2025 and 2027. A draft constitution for a "Republic of Bougainville" was published by the Autonomous Bougainville Government in May 2024. In March 2025, the Bougainville Independence Leaders Consultation Forum (BILCF) recommended 1 September 2027 as the date of independence. Prime Minister James Marape cautioned that Bougainville's economy is not sustainable enough for independence. In July 2026, the BILCF changed their recommended date of independence to 1 September 2030.

On August 6, 2026, the Joint Supervisory Body, the organ in which a delegation from the government of Papua New Guinea, led by Bougainville Affairs Minister Manasseh Makiba, has been negotiating with a delegation from the Autonomous Bougainville Government, led by Vice President and Attorney-General Ezekiel Masat, signed its final consultation documents which advocated for independence to be respected. Papua New Guinea's parliament then announced that it would be having debate on if the independence referendum should be respected on August 27. Shortly after, on August 11, Bougainville's president Ishmael Toroama warned the PNG parliament that the prospect of them rejecting the referendum was "unacceptable" and would be a "dangerous legal fiction", further stating that Bougainville's independence was "sealed in ink and blood", and reiterating that Bougainville would become independent regardless of parliament's opinion.

PNG's parliament began debating independence on August 27, however, 111 of the 118 MPs present could not come to a decision after the August 30 deadline as members of the opposition stated they only had a week to review the report by the Joint Supervisory Body.

== Geography ==
The Bougainville region occupies the north of the Solomon archipelago with Bougainville Island, which is the largest island of this group. The border between Papua New Guinea and the nation of Solomon Islands lies just south in the middle of a 9 km (5.6 mi) strait that separates it from the Shortland Islands.

The island of Buka is north of Bougainville, separated by a narrow strait. The region includes other more or less remote islands and atolls:

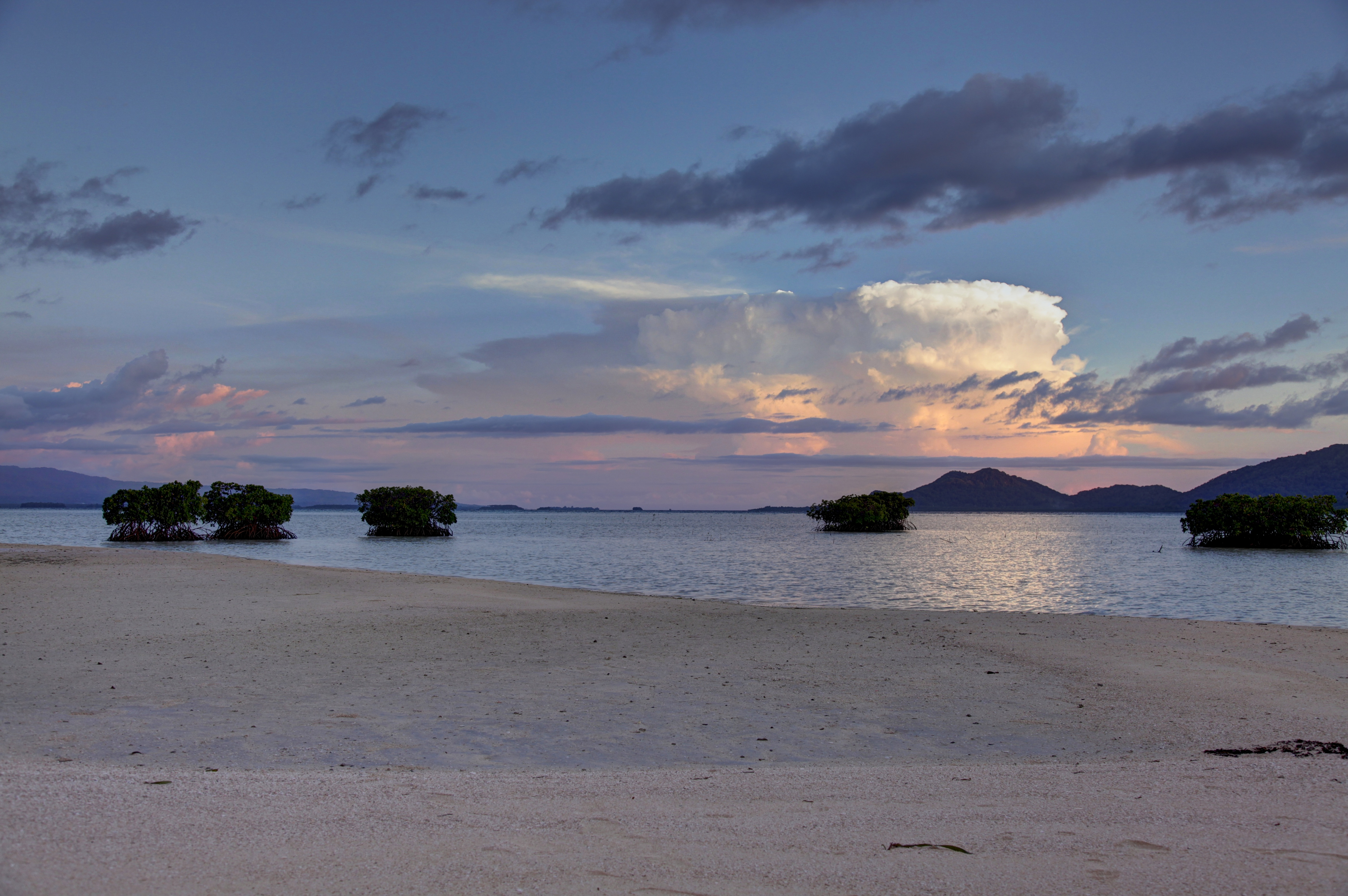
White Island, Bougainville

- the Green Islands with its main island Nissan
- the Carteret Islands
- Takuu Atoll, a Polynesian outlier
- Nukumanu Atoll, a Polynesian outlier
- the Nuguria Islands, a Polynesian outlier

The territory constitutes an archipelago in the Pacific Ocean that has an area of 9384 square kilometres.

== Government and politics ==
Elections for the first autonomous government were held in May and June 2005; Joseph Kabui, an independence leader, was elected president. He died in office on 6 June 2008. He was succeeded by his vice-president John Tabinaman in an acting capacity until an election was held in 2008 which saw James Tanis win. Tanis was only elected to serve out the remainder of Kabui's term, as such, elections where again held in 2010 that saw Tanis defeated by John Momis. Momis supported autonomy within a relationship with the national government of Papua New Guinea and won re-election in 2015. He was succeeded by Ishmael Toroama, a former militant of the Bougainville Revolutionary Army, in 2020. Toroama views Bougainville remaining in Papua New Guinea as "unacceptable."

The Constitution of Bougainville specifies that the Autonomous Bougainville Government shall consist of three branches:

- Executive: the president of the Autonomous Region of Bougainville, who chairs the Bougainville Executive Council
- Legislative: the Bougainville House of Representatives (39 elected members and two ex officio members)
- Judicial: the Bougainville Courts, including a Supreme Court and High Court

The capital city is Buka, which became the centre of government after Arawa was damaged during the Bougainville Civil War. The status of Buka is considered temporary, and the government is deciding on the location of a permanent capital.

=== 2019 independence referendum ===
The governments of both Bougainville and Papua New Guinea held a two-week referendum period which began on 23 November 2019 and closed on 7 December 2019, which is the final step in the Bougainville Peace Agreement. The referendum question was a choice between greater autonomy within Papua New Guinea, or full independence. Over 98% of the valid ballots were cast for independence.

Ishmael Toroama, a former rebel leader, was elected president of Bougainville on 23 September 2020.

Negotiations between Papua New Guinea and Bougainville began on 17 May 2021. While Toroama stated a desire to see Bougainville become independent by June 2025, Papua New Guinea Prime Minister James Marape cautioned against setting a specific timetable. On 7 July 2021, it was announced that Bougainville will become independent by the end of 2027 pending approval of the PNG parliament. In March 2025, the Bougainville Independence Leaders Consultation Forum recommended 1 September 2027 as the date of independence.

=== Districts and Local Level Government areas ===
District map of the Autonomous Region of Bougainville

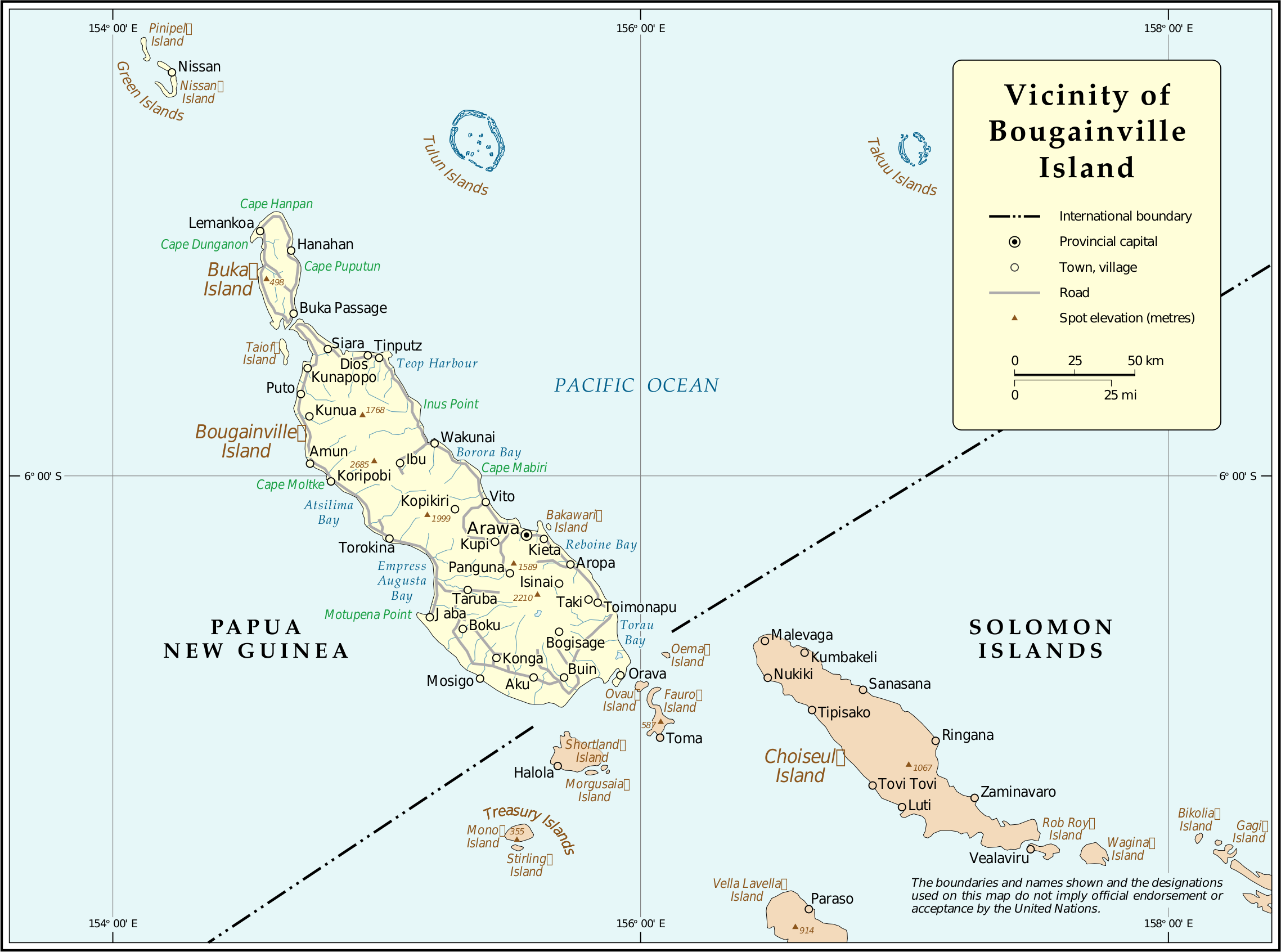
Map of the vicinity of Bougainville Island

The region is divided into three districts, which are further divided into local level government (LLGs) areas. For census purposes, the LLGAs are subdivided into wards, and those into census units.

District	District capital	LLGA name
Central Bougainville District	Arawa-Kieta	Arawa Rural
Central Bougainville District	Arawa-Kieta	Wakunai Rural
North Bougainville District	Buka	Atolls Rural
North Bougainville District	Buka	Buka Rural
North Bougainville District	Buka	Kunua Rural
North Bougainville District	Buka	Nissan Rural
North Bougainville District	Buka	Selau-Suir Rural
North Bougainville District	Buka	Tinputz Rural
South Bougainville District	Buin	Bana Rural
South Bougainville District	Buin	Buin Rural
South Bougainville District	Buin	Siwai Rural
South Bougainville District	Buin	Torokina Rural

== Demographics ==
=== Religion ===
The great majority of Bougainville residents are Christian, with an estimated 70% being Roman Catholic and a substantial minority being of the Protestant United Church of Papua New Guinea since 1968. The Catholic Church has its own diocese in the region (Diocese of Bougainville or Dioecesis Buganvillensis). The cathedral and main church is dedicated to Our Lady of the Assumption, and can be found on Buka Island. It was formerly the Church of St. Michael the Archangel in the former mission of Tubiana. There are a total of 33 Catholic parishes and one mission in the region.

=== Languages ===
Children in Arawa, June 2015

Bougainville's constitution, written in English, does not specify an official language, but calls for constitutional literature to be translated into Tok Pisin and as many local languages as possible, while also encouraging the "development, preservation, and enrichment of all Bougainville languages".

The most widely spoken Austronesian language is Halia and its dialects, spoken in the island of Buka and the Selau peninsula of Northern Bougainville. Other Austronesian languages include Nehan, Petats, Solos, Saposa (Taiof), Hahon and Tinputz, all spoken in the northern quarter of Bougainville, Buka and surrounding islands. These languages are closely related. Bannoni and Torau are Austronesian languages not closely related to the former, which are spoken in the coastal areas of central and south Bougainville. On the nearby Takuu Atoll a Polynesian language is spoken, Takuu.

As noted in the introduction, there are also some non-Austronesian languages spoken on Bougainville.

== Economy ==
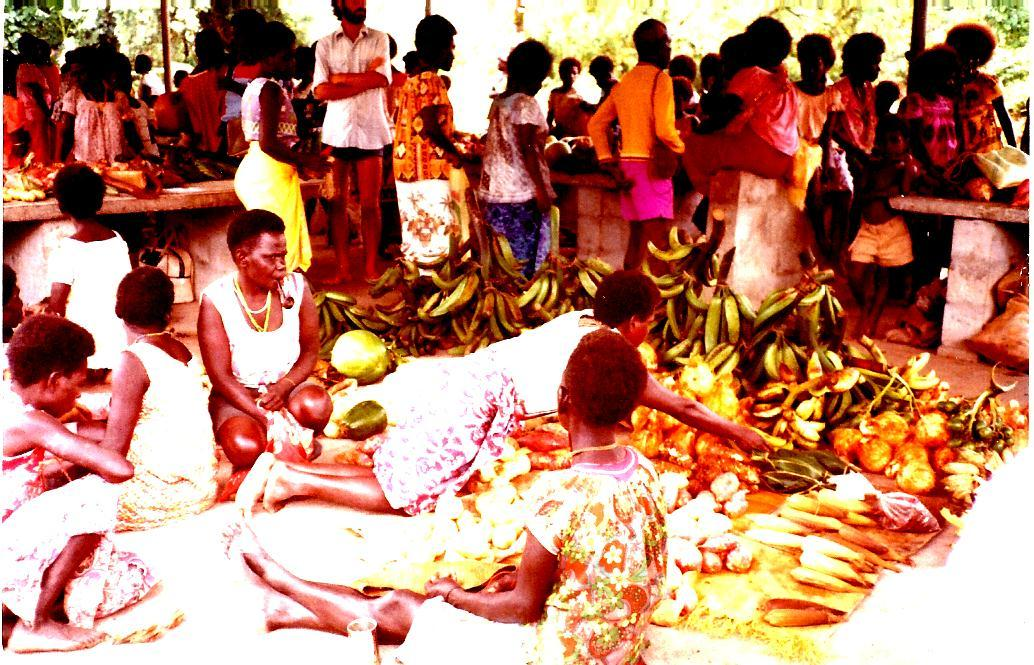
Market at Buin, 1978

Official statistics about Bougainville's economy are not available. The PNG National Research Institute estimates its GDP per capita at $1100 as of 2019.

A small percentage of the region's economy is from mining. The majority of economic growth comes from agriculture and aquaculture. The region's biodiversity, which is one of the most important in Oceania, is heavily threatened by mining activities. Mining activities have caused civil unrest in the region many times. In January 2018, a moratorium on one mine was imposed by the Papua New Guinea government, in a bid to calm civil unrest against mining in the region.

Bougainville had one of the world's largest open-pit copper mines, the Pangunamine, from 1972 to 1989, which for many years generated a large part of Papua New Guinea's gross national product. The mine was operated by the Australian company Bougainville Copper (BLC), a subsidiary of the British-Australian mining company Rio Tinto/CRA, which had majority control of the company. The state of Papua New Guinea (PNG) holds a 19.1% stake in Bougainville Copper.

As a result of the civil war and the rebel-forced closure of the mine, Papua New Guinea's government revenues fell by 20%. Some hope for the eventual reopening of the Panguna mine. Negotiations to reopen the Panguna mine began in early March 2006 with talks between former PNG Mines Minister Sam Akoitai and the Rio Tinto corporation in London. Some representatives of landowners in the Panguna area have repeatedly agreed to resume mining operations, albeit in conjunction with demands for large compensation payments from the mine operator BCL.

Yields from the two main exports, cocoa and copra, returned to pre-civil war levels in 2007. Largely operated by Europeans, Asians, churches and corporations, large-scale commercial plantations, which were responsible for a significant share of production before the civil war, are now used by smaller local operators. Further processing is done by small cocoa dryers promoted by AusAid.

Bougainville Region is the most productive in all of PNG for cocoa. Omuru et al., 2001 find households farming cacao (Theobroma cacao) average an income of US$215/year. The Cocoa Pod Borer (Conopomorpha cramerella) was considered a large risk for invasion here due to its invasion of nearby areas of Southeast Asia including East New Britain. There was great interest in modelling and phytosanitation practices to forestall its introduction. Unfortunately CPB did arrive here and in 2011 the World Bank's Productive Partnerships in Agriculture Project was created to help farmers control the insect. From the 2009 production level, bean tonnage fell by over 41% by 2014 (although this also includes trees aging out). The Tinputz area – including Namatoa – had been the highest-producing part of the region and has seen many farms be abandoned and return to jungle. PPAP hopes to revive the industry around Namatoa. Cryptolaemus sinestria is a mealybug of cacao trees here, observed at a Buka agricultural station.

Termites are common agricultural pests in Bougainville. Microcerotermes biroi and Nasutitermes novanimhebridarum are pests of coconut (Cocos nucifera). N. novanimhebridarum is also a pest of cacao (Theobroma cacao) here. Termite pests found here tend to be shared with many of the nearby islands.

In April 2026, President of the Autonomous Region of Bougainville, Ishmael Toroama, announced the launch of the region’s first airline, Bougainville Wings, based at Buka Airport. The airline is a joint venture between the Autonomous Bougainville Government (ABG) and Outback Aviation, with Bougainville holding a 70% stake.

== Culture ==
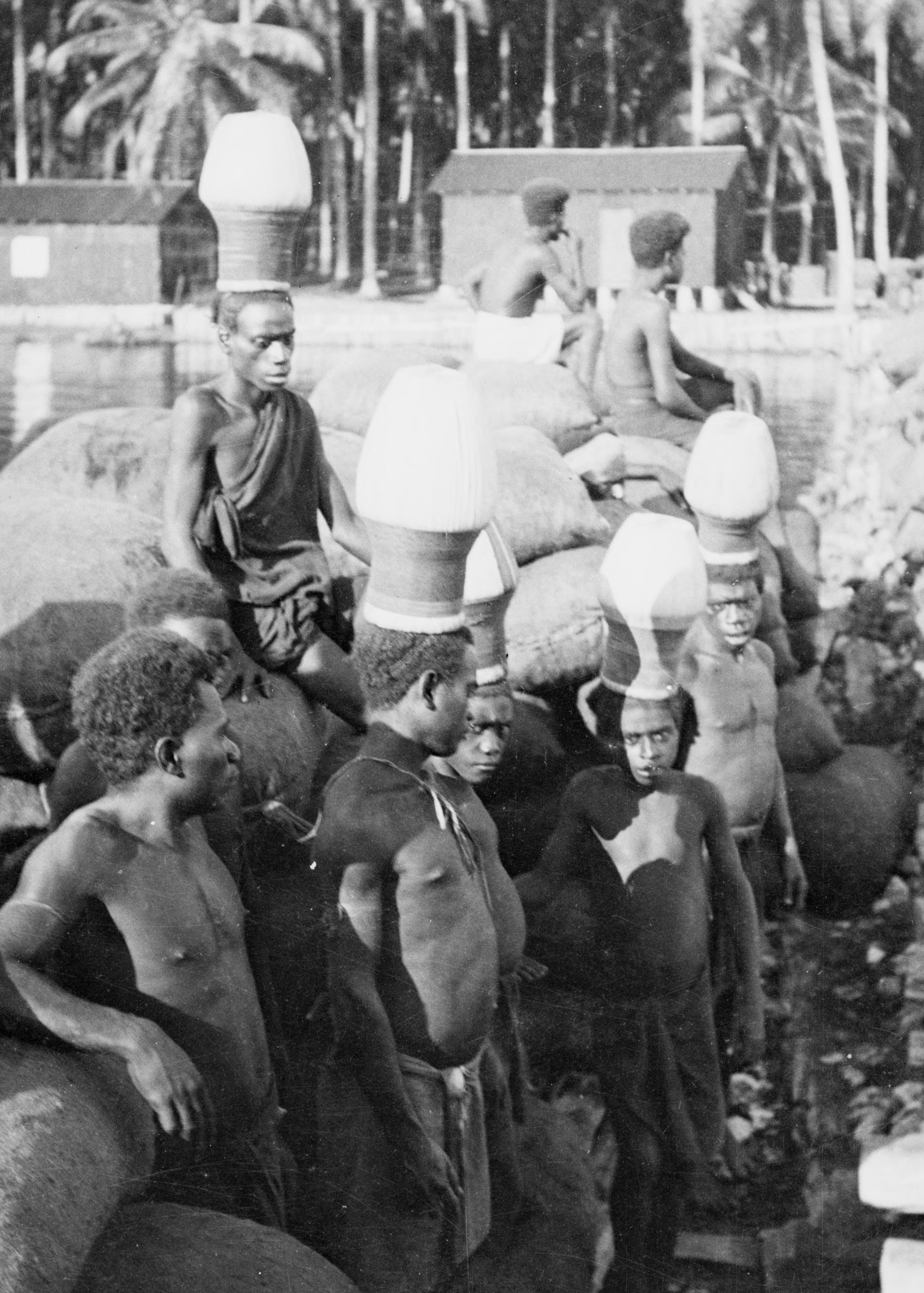
Men from Soraken wearing upe, a headdress representing the transition to adulthood, which later became a national symbol of Bougainville

=== National symbols ===
A law passed by the provincial assembly – the Bougainville Flag, Emblem and Anthem (Protection) Act 2018 – affirmed the existing official status of the flag of Bougainville and emblem of Bougainville. Both the flag and emblem feature stylised depictions of the upe, a traditional headdress worn by men in parts of Bougainville to symbolise their transition to adulthood. The law also established "My Bougainville" as the region's anthem.

=== Sport ===
Rugby league in Bougainville is administered by the Bougainville Rugby Football League (BRFL), which is affiliated with the Papua New Guinea Rugby Football League (PNGRFL). A number of Bougainvilleans have played for the Papua New Guinea national rugby league team, including Bernard Wakatsi, Joe Katsi, Lauta Atoi, and Chris Siriosi.

F.C. Bougainville has played in the National Soccer League since 2019, although it is based in Port Moresby rather than in Bougainville itself. Previously, a team from Bougainville won the national soccer championships in 1977, defeating Rabaul. Historically the Bougainville Soccer Association came into conflict with the Papua New Guinea Football Association over various matters.

During the 1970s and 1980s, teams from Bougainville played against other regions in the PNG national championships for Australian rules football, cricket, and field hockey.

Boxing is popular in Bougainville. The region won the 2017 National Boxing Championships, which were hosted in Arawa. Notable boxers from the region include Commonwealth Boxing Council titleholder Johnny Aba and Pacific Games gold medalist Thadius Katua.

Bougainvillean netball player Maleta Roberts has played professionally in Australia and represented the Papua New Guinea national netball team at the Commonwealth Games.

== See also ==
- Bougainville – Our Island Our Fight, a 1998 documentary film
- List of active separatist movements in Oceania
- List of autonomous areas by country
- North Solomon Islands
