= Carteret Islands =

Papua New Guinea islands in located in northeast of Bougainville in the South Pacific

Carteret Islands Tulun Kilinailau
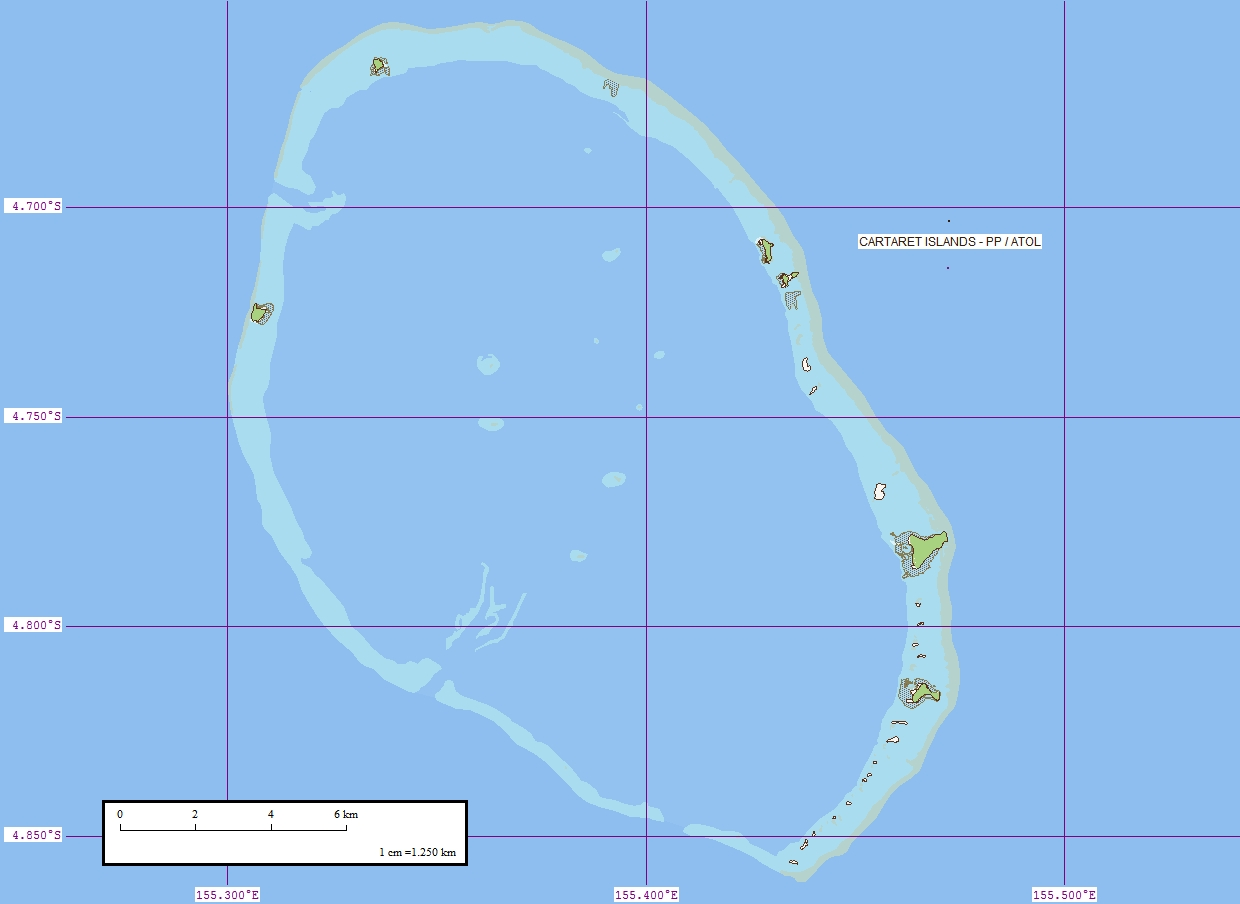
- Map of the atoll

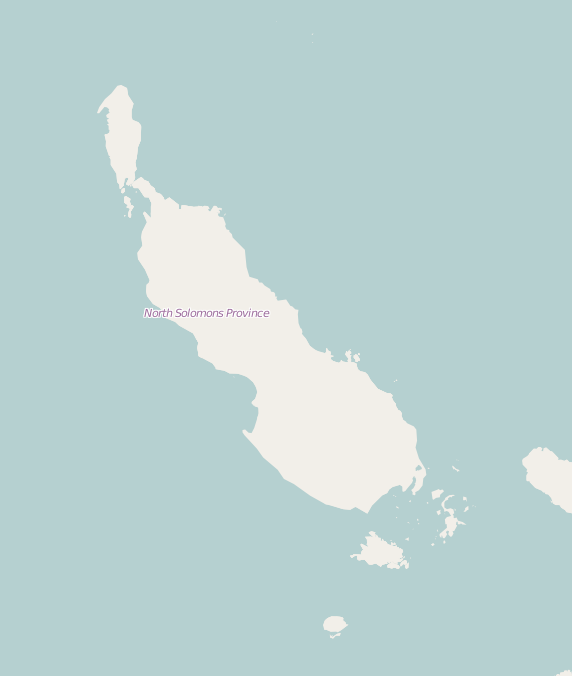
- Location within Bougainville Island Location within Papua New Guinea

Geography
- Location: Melanesia
- Coordinates: 04°46′57″S 155°27′54″E
- Total islands: 7
- Area: 295 km^{2} (114 sq mi)
- Length: 25.2 km (15.66 mi)
- Width: 16.2 km (10.07 mi)
- Highest elevation: 1.6 m (5.2 ft)

Administration
- Papua New Guinea
- Autonomous Region: Bougainville
- District: North Bougainville
- Local-level government: Atolls Rural

Demographics
- Population: 2,600 (2006)

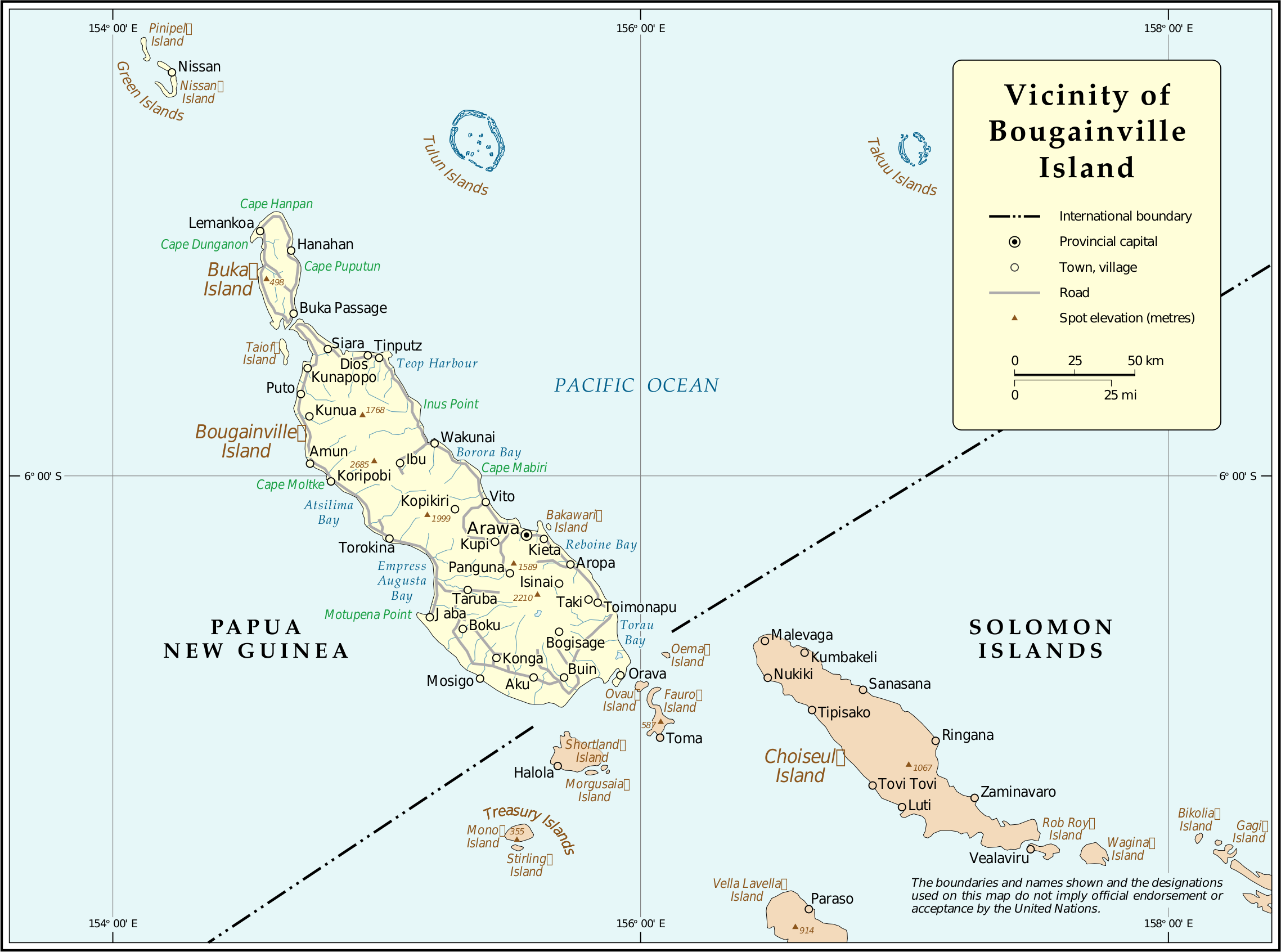
District map of Bougainville Island (North Solomons). The Carteret Islands are labelled "Tulun Islands" here (near top left).

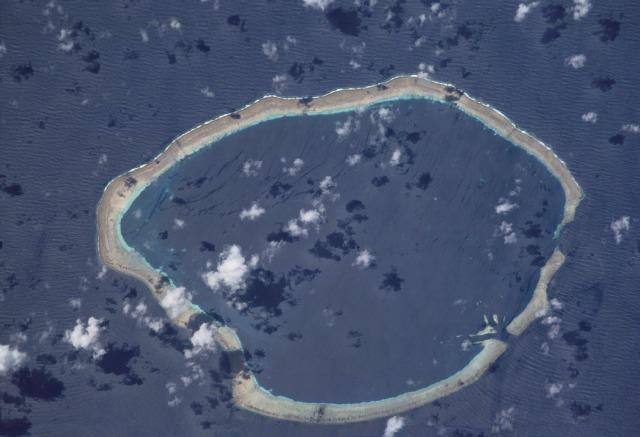
The Carteret Atoll seen from space. Rotate the image about 70 degrees clockwise and north will be at the top. Courtesy NASA.

The Carteret Islands (also known as Carteret Atoll, originally known as Tulun or Kilinailau Islands/Atoll) are Papua New Guinea islands located 86 km (53 mi) north-east of Bougainville in the South Pacific. The atoll has a scattering of low-lying islands called Han, Jangain, Yesila, Yolasa and Piul, in a horseshoe shape stretching 30 km (19 mi) in north–south direction, with a total land area of 0.6 square kilometres (0.2 sq mi) and a maximum elevation of 1.5 metres (4 ft 11.1 in) above sea level.

The group is made up of islands collectively named after the British navigator Philip Carteret, who was the first European to discover them, arriving in the sloop HMS Swallow in 1767. As of 2005, about one thousand people lived on the islands. Although the Carteret islanders’ ancestors have lived on the island for thousands of years. Han is the most significant island, with the others being small islets around the lagoon. The main settlement is at Weteili on Han. The island is near the edge of the large geologic formation called the Ontong Java Plateau. The island has experienced significant damage due to its low elevation and rising sea levels due to climate change.

== Carteret islanders ==
The Carteret Islands inhabitants are a Halia-speaking community closely related to the population of Hanhan Bay, in nearby Buka Island. Their customs are very similar to those of the Buka, although with some important adaptations to the atoll environment. The Carteret Islanders call themselves the Tuluun.

Like the Halia, Hakö, Selau and Solos groups in Buka and Bougainville, the Tuluun reckon descent matrilineally. They are primarily organized into two moiety-like groups, the Nakaripa and Naboen. Unlike moieties in a true dual organization system, Nakaripa and Naboen are not exogamous in practice, though a strong preference for exogamy is usually reported. Exogamy is important in the organization of political power. Male and female chiefs attempt to organize cross-moiety marriages, the main reason for this being that the legitimation of chiefly power requires the participation of the opposite moiety.

Oral tradition states that the Carteret Islands were originally inhabited by a Polynesian group closely related to the Nukumanu, or Mortlock Islanders. The islands were discovered by a fishing expedition from Hahalis. According to the Halia tradition, the first attempt to reach the islands had a peaceful intention, but ended in the massacre of the Halia expedition. The Munihil, or paramount chief of Hanahan Bay then organized a large flotilla of canoes to attack the Polynesian population, and conquered the islands. By contrast, the Mortlock Islanders state that the Halia mounted a blood and murder surprise attack to remove their relatives.

Genealogical information suggest that the Halia invasion took place in the early 18th century. Lieutenant Erasmus Gower (sailing with Commander Philip Carteret) reported the population as being dark-skinned in 1767.

== Post-European contact history ==
The inhabitants of the Carteret Islands have lived in this island group for more than 200 years. The islands are named in honor of Philip Carteret, who discovered the set of islands aboard HMS Swallow on 24 June 1767.

When visited in 1830 by Benjamin Morrell in the schooner Antarctic, several islands had a native population who were growing a variety of crops. One small island was uninhabited and covered with heavy timber. With the approval of the area's ruler, Morrell's crew began construction on the southwest corner of the island in the northeast part of the atoll, with the intent to harvest snail meat and edible bird nests for the Chinese market.

Departing after a fatal attack on his crew, Morrell named the islands the Massacre Islands.

Food staples have been cultivated: taro and coconut and fishing supports the people. The area had been inhabited for about 1,000 years before European contact in about 1880, when the copra trade and other activities altered the economy and customs. Population grew rapidly in the early 1900s, and overcrowding in the 1930s caused a population decline. In recent years, climate change has had an immense impact on Carteret Islands. The sea level has risen and led to coastal erosion and flooding. This has contaminated the water supply for drinking and agriculture. The islanders’ crop yield has been significantly impacted and led to food shortages. These issues have forced residents to leave the land their ancestors have lived on for thousands of years. In the 1990s the islanders were identified as economic and environmental refugees. The Carteret Islands have recently received international attention for being the first climate refugees.

== Carteret islander community in the present ==
The Carteret Islanders are frequently described as the world's first "climate refugees" or victims, but they want to be known as survivors. The documentary Sun Come Up illustrates the community in the present. Elders in the film reminisce about their happy childhoods on the island before the sea levels rose past their island's boundaries. The island used to be filled with crops including banana trees, sugar cane and swamp taro.

However, now the land is turning into a desert because of saltwater contamination. Climate change has destroyed islanders' access to freshwater and food. There is fear amongst the community that there will soon be no place for them to live and build a future. The islanders utilize shells as currency, and they explain how they use that with pigs to buy land and to build a bond between the Carteret islanders and people in nearby Bougainville. The documentary highlights the group of young people selected to go to Bougainville in search of land. It was challenging for the community to make the decision to leave their homeland because of their deep connection with the environment, but climate change created such obstacles they were forced to search for a future. It was also difficult for them to imagine a life with different culture and values. On their search for new land the Carteret people were afraid because they had never experienced weapons and alcohol before. The civil war in Bougainville affected the people there and the Carteret people were not sure if they would be welcomed on the island. However, they eventually found a community that agrees to share a space for them to live. They are excited at the idea of providing their family a safe place to live and build a future, but the Carteret people worry that they will not be the Carteret people anymore, as since they will reside in the town of Tinputz, they will be "Tinputz people". The community is distressed that most of their culture will have to live in memory, as their history on the Carteret Islands will be washed away.

== Physical atoll conditions ==
Like many other atolls throughout the Pacific Ocean, this one is very low-lying and its main constituent, the coral, needs to be covered in water most of the time. Land is created by the ocean when some vegetation, such as a coconut palm or mangrove shoots, take hold in the much shallower parts of the reef. One tree leads to a slight buildup of coral sand around its base. This leads to more trees (palms) and the size of the individual islets on the reef grow. Over the long period the islands progress from the seaward edge of the atoll towards the lagoon as the sand is blown and washed towards the calmer shore. It is easy to determine the direction of the prevailing winds by observing the position and condition of the islets on the reef.

Climate change has increased the frequency and intensity of storms globally. The Carteret Islands have endured some of the most significant impacts between rising sea levels and extreme weather events. This has not only caused water contamination, but also erosion. Palms or trees that become exposed in storms usually die by losing their grip in the little sand left at the end of the storm season. Sometimes whole islets get washed away.

People live on the larger island or islands formed around the atoll and trek back and forth to the smaller ones by walking the reef at low tide or by small canoes. Much of the taro is grown away from the inhabited island. It is often very vulnerable to salt-water inundation, but by being away from the living area is protected from human-waste contamination.

== Climate justice ==
The Carteret Islands are being disproportionately impacted by climate change. While the Carteret Islanders have had little impact on climate change, their lives and home are being destroyed as a result.

Large greenhouse gas emitters like the Panguna mine have immense impacts on climate change. They take natural resources from land they are not native to for consumption and economic profit, but do not consider the impact it has on residents and surrounding environments. The careless consumption accelerates climate change, which has destroyed the ability to live on the Carteret islands and forced the islanders to make decision to relocate from their homes. The mines also imposed additional challenges on the Carterets by creating conflict in surrounding areas which makes it more complicated to find a safe place to move their community to.

It was widely reported in November 2005 that the islands have progressively become uninhabitable, with an incorrect estimate of their total submersion by 2015. The islanders have built a sea wall and are planting mangroves to mitigate rising sea levels. However, storm surges and high tides continue to wash away homes, destroy vegetable gardens and contaminate fresh water supplies. The natural tree cover on the island is also being impacted by the incursion of saltwater contamination of the freshwater table.

Paul Tobasi, the atoll's district manager with Papua New Guinea's Bougainville province and many other environmental groups have suggested that the flooding is the result of sea level rise associated with global warming. He also stated that small storm surges were becoming more frequent. During the storm surges water has been flowing into the farm land on the island and destroying their crops for the season. Access to clean water and food is a basic human right that is currently being denied to the people on the Carteret Islands.

The government has put minimal effort into helping the community. They send an emergency shipments of rice, but it is not enough to sustain the islanders for very long, so their health is diminishing. The money the government has spent on rice could buy the islanders over 300 hectares, 740 acres of land in Bougainville that could be used to settle hundreds of families. However, the government does not have any strategic plan in dealing with climate change refugees like the Carteret Islanders.

Those convinced the islands are sinking, not the sea-level rising, also propose that "Some depletion of the fresh water aquifer may also contribute to the sinking," but do not explain how depletion of the fresh water aquifer could be significant on an island that is no more than 1.5 m higher than sea-level. According to some natural scientists, "The region is also tectonically active and subsiding land is a real possibility." However, The Carteret Islands lie on the Pacific Plate, lying east of and above where the Solomon Sea plate is subducting underneath it.

Food relief being delivered in 2007

== Ongoing relocation ==
Due to climate change, the sea levels are rising, and the Carteret Islands are battling immense coastal erosion and flooding. It has forced the islanders to an impossible decision whether to stay on the land their ancestors have lived on for thousands of years or find new land with safe water and food that will offer their community a future. This is a difficult situation, many residents have imagined a future for their families that is not possible on the saltwater-contaminated island. It is challenging for them to find new land for their entire community, so this has been a long process. There have been many different relocation attempts since the 1980s, but many are unable to find new land and return to what is left of their homeland.

On 25 November 2003, the Papua New Guinean government authorized the government-funded total evacuation of the islands, 10 families at a time; the evacuation was expected to be completed by 2007, but access to funding caused numerous delays.

In October 2007 it was announced that the Papua New Guinea government would provide two million kina (US$736,000) to begin the relocation, to be organized by Tulele Peisa of Buka, Bougainville. Five men from the island moved to Bougainville in early 2009 and built some houses and planted crops for their families to follow. There was a plan to bring another 1700 people over the next five years. However, there has been no large-scale evacuation seem set into effect as of November 2011. In 2016, Ursula Rakova's Tulele Peisa expressed its target to relocate half the population before 2020. Tulele Peisa has 85 hectares of land at the main island of the Autonomous Region of Bougainville, to the east of mainland Papua New Guinea, to resettle 35 families. As of 2021, 10 families have been relocated to Tinputz.

In 2007, CNN reported that the Carteret islanders will be the first island community in the world to undergo an organized relocation in response to rising sea levels. The people of the Carteret are being called the world's first environmental refugees.

In 2017 the Finnish Embassy in Canberra, which is involved in an aid project, reported that despite the relocation efforts, there are more people than ever living at the atoll, and the atoll has practically doubled its population.

== Notable people ==
The documentary Sun Come Up interviews locals, including John Sailik, Ursula Rakova, and Nicholas Hakata, who share how climate change threatens their survival and the painful decision-making process behind their journey to find new land. Ursula Rakova has been a leader in the relocation of her community. She tells the interviewer how people are living on the land but the food growing there is becoming scarce and undependable. She says that if her community does not move off the atoll they will be washed away, and we will ask if we have done enough. She emphasizes that although the Carteret people are being disproportionately impacts, climate change is going to impact everyone soon because the environment is all connected.

== See also ==
- Sun Come Up
