= Ursula Rakova =

Papua New Guinean environmental activist

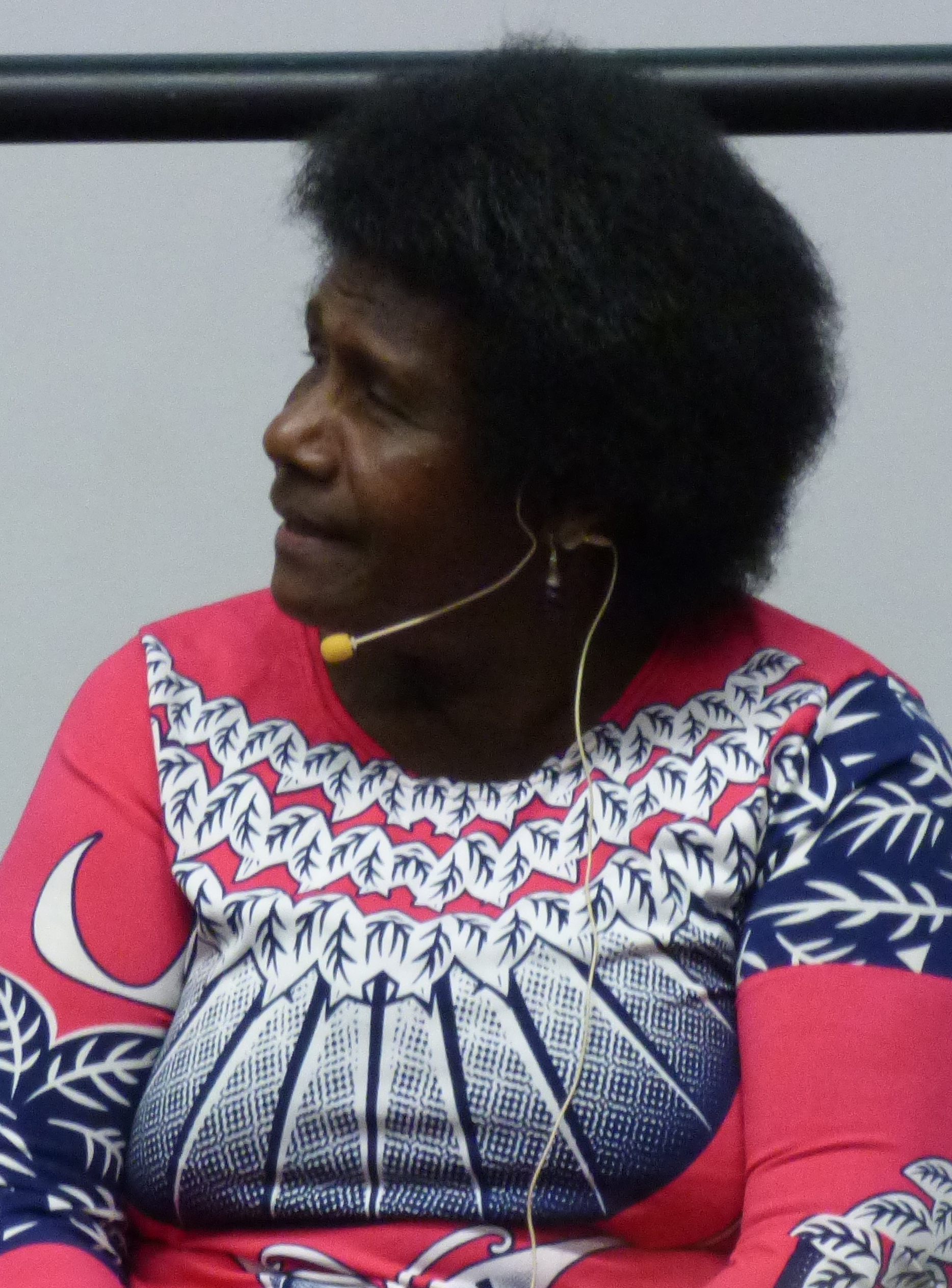
- Rakova speaking in Adelaide in 2018
- Born: 1964 or 1965; Han, Carteret Atoll, Papua New Guinea
- Employer: Tulele Peisa
- Known for: Environmental activism
- Awards: Pride of PNG; 2008

Ursula Rakova (born 1964 or 1965) is a Papua New Guinean environmentalist and climate change activist. In 2008, she was awarded the Pride of PNG award for her environmental contributions to the development of her country. As executive director of the not-for-profit organisation Tulele Peisa, she is responsible for organizing the relocation of the inhabitants of the Carteret Islands to the mainland of Bougainville Province. The islands are expected to be uninhabitable by 2040, rendering Rakova's people the world's first climate refugees.

== Career ==
Rakova was born in 1964 or 1965 on the islet of Han in the Carteret Atoll. In 2005. she established a community schooling system in Bougainville as an alternative to the failed public school system. In 2006 she established Tulele Peisa to assist her people with relocation as the Carteret Islands were becoming increasingly exposed to sea level rise. The first settlement was established in Tinputz. Rakova has assisted in establishing several environmental NGO's in Papua New Guinea and Bougainville. She coordinated a landmark legal case whereby the Warangoi successfully sued illegal loggers and won compensation for their stolen forest resource. She established Bougainville Cocoa Net Limited to assist relocated Carteret Islanders with opportunities to produce fair trade cocoa.
