= Rapoisi language =

North Bougainville language

Konua
- Rapoisi
- Native to: Papua New Guinea
- Region: Bougainville
- Native speakers: (3,500 cited 1998)
- Language family: North Bougainville: Konua

Language codes
- ISO 639-3: kyx
- Glottolog: rapo1238

Konua, also known as Rapoisi, is a language spoken on Bougainville Island in Papua New Guinea.

== Phonology ==
=== Consonants ===
Consonant phonemes
Place Manner	Bilabial	Dento-Alveolar	Velar	Glottal
Stop	p	t̪	k	ʔ
Fricative	β	s	ɣ	h
Tap		ɾ		

- /p/ is often pronounced as [ɸ] word initially
- /t̪/ does not occur before /i/
- /β ɾ ɣ/ have the allophones [b d~l g] respectively. The nasal allophones [m n ŋ] occur utterance-initial.

=== Vowels ===
Vowel phonemes
	Front	Back
High	i	u
Mid	e	o
Low	ɑ	

=== Orthography ===
Rapoisi is written in the Latin alphabet, with 14 letters.

Letters	Uppercase	A	B	E	G	H	I	K	O	P	R	S	T	U	’
Letters	Lowercase	a	b	e	g	h	i	k	o	p	r	s	t	u	’
IPA		ɑ	β	e	ɣ	h	i	k	o	p	ɾ	s	t̪	u	ʔ

== Grammar ==
=== Pronouns ===
			A	S	O	Poss.
1st Person	Excl.	Singular	aga, aru			-ai
1st Person	Excl.	Dual	ioka			-abi
1st Person	Excl.	Plural	ioka			-abi
1st Person	Incl.	Dual	peka			-abi
1st Person	Incl.	Plural	bioga			-abi
2nd Person	Singular		bira, biru			-ari
2nd Person	Dual		mega			-abisi
2nd Person	Plural		itarea			-abisi
3rd Person	Singular	Gender 1	ita			-ara
3rd Person	Singular	Gender 2	ia			-ʔo
3rd Person	Dual		siga			-ara
3rd Person	Plural		pirio			-ara

== Vocabulary ==
The table below is a sample of words in Rapoisi:

Word	Meaning
aga, aru	I
bira	you
bioga, biru	we
arei	one
bo suku	two
atari	fish
kesu	dog
utuo	louse
evaita	tree
hara	leaf
kaparue	skin
parakoa	blood
reu	bone
reruo	horn
ubateo	ear
otei	eye
birao, iruba	nose
asi	tooth
ubiubi	knee
akapio	hand
aterariba	liver
era	drink
keke	see
ubara	hear
pi	die
luilui	come
isiro	sun
bapi, uo	water
aipo	stone
uhi	fire
ohopa	path
hukihuki	mountain
bogi	night
ueibara	new
ute	name
