= Lawunuia language =

Austronesian language of Papua New Guinea

Lawunuia
- Piva
- Native to: Papua New Guinea
- Region: Piva River, Bougainville Province
- Native speakers: (2,000 cited 2000)
- Language family: Austronesian: Malayo-Polynesian; Oceanic; Western; Meso-Melanesian; Northwest Solomonic; Piva–Banoni; Lawunuia

Language codes
- ISO 639-3: tgi
- Glottolog: lawu1237

Lawunuia (also called Piva) is an Austronesian language spoken along the Piva river in the Autonomous Region of Bougainville, Papua New Guinea. It is closely related to Banoni; together, Lawununia and Banoni make up one of the five primary branches of Northwest Solomonic, a major subgroup of the Oceanic languages.
