= North Bougainville languages =

Language family

North Bougainville
- West Bougainville
- Geographic distribution: Bougainville Island
- Linguistic classification: One of the world's primary language families
- Subdivisions: Keriaka; Konua; Askopan–Rotokas

Language codes
- Glottolog: nort2933
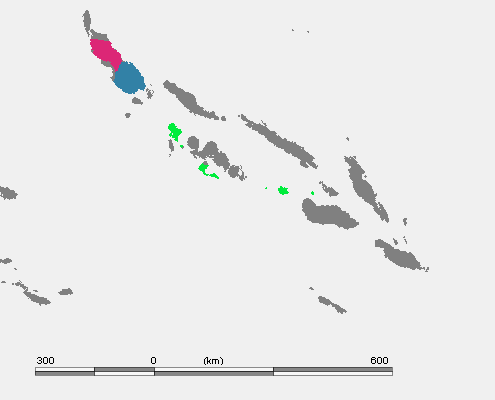
- Language families of the Solomon Islands. North Bougainville

The North Bougainville or West Bougainville languages are a small language family spoken on the island of Bougainville in Papua New Guinea. They were classified as East Papuan languages by Stephen Wurm, but this no longer seems tenable, and was abandoned in Ethnologue (2009).

The family includes the closely related Rotokas and Eivo (Askopan) languages, together with two languages that are more distantly related.

== Spoken languages ==
- Keriaka (Ramopa)
- Konua (Rapoisi)
- Rotokas branch
  - Rotokas
  - Askopan (Eivo)

There are about 9,000 speakers combined for all four North Bougainville languages.

== See also ==
- Papuan languages
- East Papuan languages
- South Bougainville languages
