= Ramopa language =

East Papuan language spoken on Bougainville

Ramopa
- Keriaka
- Native to: Papua New Guinea
- Region: Bougainville
- Native speakers: (1,000 cited 1981)
- Language family: North Bougainville: Ramopa

Language codes
- ISO 639-3: kjx
- Glottolog: ramo1245

Ramopa, or Keriaka, is a North Bougainville language spoken on Bougainville Island in Papua New Guinea.
