= Rotokas language =

North Bougainville language

Rotokas
- Native to: Papua New Guinea
- Region: Bougainville
- Native speakers: (4,300 cited 1981)
- Language family: North Bougainville: Askopan–Rotokas; Rotokas
- Dialects: Central; Pipipaia; Aita; Atsilima
- Writing system: Latin (Rotokas alphabet)

Language codes
- ISO 639-3: roo
- Glottolog: roto1249

Rotokas is a North Bougainville language spoken by about 4,320 people on Bougainville Island in Papua New Guinea.

Central Rotokas is most notable for its extremely small phonemic consonantal inventory, which lacks phonemic nasals.

== Dialects ==
According to Jerry Allen and Conrad Hurd, there are three identified dialects: Central Rotokas ("Rotokas Proper"), Aita Rotokas, and Pipipaia; with a further dialect spoken in Atsilima (Atsinima) village with an unclear status.

== Phonology ==
The Central dialect of Rotokas possesses one of the world's smallest phonemic consonantal inventories. Central Rotokas has a vowel length distinction between long and short, but otherwise lacks distinctive suprasegmental features such as tone, and probably stress.

=== Consonants ===
Whereas Central Rotokas has only six consonantal phonemes, Aita Rotokas has nine; Aita adds phonemic nasals (e.g. this example of a minimal pair, /buta/ 'time' vs. /muta/ 'taste'). The Central dialect's limited inventory likely arose by collapsing the phonemic distinction between nasals and non-nasals.

Nasals in Aita always correspond to voiced plosives in Central (e.g. "tree" is emaoto in Aita and ebaoto in Central), but voiced plosives in Central can correspond to either nasals or voiced plosives in Aita.

==== Central Rotokas ====
Consonants occur in three places of articulation: bilabial, alveolar, and velar, each with a voiceless and voiced variant.

Nasals are rarely heard. They will sometimes be misused when speakers try to pronounce English words (e.g. "bye-bye" being pronounced [maemae]), or when trying to imitate a foreigner speaking Rotokas (even if they were not used by the foreigner).

	Bilabial	Alveolar	Velar
Voiceless	p	t	k
Voiced	b	d	ɡ

- In the 1960s, /t/ was described as being [ts ~ s] before /i/. Later research in the 2000s found this to no longer be true, possibly due to widespread bilingualism with Tok Pisin.
- /b, d, g/ present significant allophonic variation, which makes the choice of symbols for phonemes somewhat arbitrary.
  - /b/ [b, β, m]
  - /d/ [d, ɾ, l, n]
  - /g/ [ɡ, ɣ, ŋ]

==== Aita Rotokas ====
The Aita dialect has nine consonant phonemes, with a three-way contrast between voiceless and oral/nasal voiced consonants.

		Bilabial	Alveolar	Velar
Voiceless		p	t	k
Voiced	oral	b	d	ɡ
Voiced	nasal	m	n	ŋ

- /b/ varies between [b] and [β].
- /d/ is chiefly realized as [ɾ].
- /t/ is [s] before /i/.

=== Vowels ===
All vowels in the Central dialect have a length contrast, which the Aita dialect appears to lack.

	Front		Central		Back	
	short	long	short	long	short	long
Close	i	iː			u	uː
Mid	e	eː			o	oː
Open			a	aː		

- /e/ ranges from close-mid [e] to open-mid [ɛ] while /o/ is close-mid [o].

=== Orthography ===
The Rotokas orthography uses 12 letters of the Latin alphabet, with no diacritics or ligatures. The letters are a, e, g, i, k, o, p, r, s, t, u and v. Long vowels are written as doubled. /t/ is written as ⟨s⟩ before /i/ and ⟨t⟩ elsewhere and has also been written with an orthography based on the IPA symbols for its phonemes.

=== Stress ===
Stress is probably not phonemic. Words with 2 or 3 syllables are stressed on the initial syllable; those with 4 are stressed on the first and third; and those with 5 or more on the antepenultimate. This is complicated by long vowels, and there are exceptions to the third rule among some verb constructions.

== Grammar ==
Typologically, Rotokas is a fairly typical verb-final language, with adjectives and demonstrative pronouns preceding the nouns they modify, and postpositions following. Although adverbs are fairly free in their ordering, they tend to precede the verb, as in the following example:

osirei-toarei avuka-va iava ururupa-vira tou-pa-si-veira
eye-MASC.DU old-FEM.SG POST closed-ADV be-PROG-2.DU.MASC-HAB
The old woman's eyes are shut.

== Vocabulary ==
Selected basic vocabulary items in Rotokas:

gloss	Rotokas
bird	kokioto
blood	revasiva
bone	kerua
breast	rorooua
ear	uvareoua
eat	aio
egg	takura
eye	osireito
fire	tuitui
give	vate
go	ava
ground	rasito
hair	orui
hear	uvu
leg	kokotoa
louse	iirui
man	oidato
moon	kekira
name	vaisia
one	katai
road, path	raiva
see	keke
sky	vuvuiua
stone	aveke
sun	ravireo
tongue	arevuoto
tooth	reuri
tree	evaova
two	erao
water	uukoa
woman	avuo

== Sample text ==
Rotokas	Translation (English)
Vo tuariri rovoaia Pauto vuvuiua ora rasito pura-rovoreva. Vo osia rasito raga toureva, uva viapau oavu avuvai. Oire Pauto urauraaro tuepaepa aue ivaraia uukovi. Vara rutuia rupa toupaiva. Oa iava Pauto oisio puraroepa, Aviavia rorove. Oire aviavia rorova.	In the beginning God created heaven and earth. The earth was formless and empty, and darkness covered the deep water. The spirit of God was hovering over the water. Then God said, "Let there be light!" So there was light.
