= Rotokas alphabet =

Latin alphabet as used for the Rotokas language

The modern Rotokas alphabet is a Latin alphabet of the Rotokas people consisting of only 12 letters of the ISO basic Latin alphabet without diacritics:

Uppercase forms
A	E	G	I	K	O	P	R	S	T	U	V
Lowercase forms
a	e	g	i	k	o	p	r	s	t	u	v

It is the smallest alphabet in use today. The majority of the Rotokas people are literate in their language. In the Rotokas writing system the vowel letters have their IPA values, though they may be written double, aa, ee, ii, oo, uu, for long vowels. The letters have the following pronunciations:

- G: [ɡ] or [ɣ]
- K: [k]
- P: [p]
- R: [d], [ɾ] or [l]
- S: [ts] or [s] (only occurs before I and in loanwords)
- T: [t] (never occurs before I except in loanwoards)
- V: [b] or [β]

Here is a sample of written Rotokas:

Osireitoarei avukava iava ururupavira toupasiveira.
"The old lady's eyes are shut."
