= Solos language =

Austronesian language

Solos
- Native to: Papua New Guinea
- Region: Buka Island, Bougainville
- Native speakers: 15,000 (2022)
- Language family: Austronesian: Malayo-Polynesian; Oceanic; Western; Meso-Melanesian; Northwest Solomonic; Nehan–Bougainville; Solos

Language codes
- ISO 639-3: sol
- Glottolog: solo1257

Solos is an Austronesian language of Buka Island in the Autonomous Region of Bougainville in Papua New Guinea.

Approximately 15,000 people (2022) are estimated to speak Solos as a first language out of an ethnic population of about 17,000 (2022).

== Alphabet ==
Solos uses an adapted Latin alphabet of 22 characters, five of which are vowels, two are digraphs, and one is the saltillo symbol, which in practical writing and typing is often expressed as a simple apostrophe. The letters are (vowels in bold):

a, b, d, e, g, h, i, k, l, m, n, ng, o, p, r, s, t, ts, u, w, y, ꞌ

⟨ng⟩ is used for /ŋ/, ⟨ts⟩ is used for /t͡ʃ/, ⟨y⟩ is used for /j/, and ⟨ꞌ⟩ is used for the glottal stop /ʔ/. The other letters are approximately phonetic.

== Phonology ==
Solos has about 21 core phonemes: 5 vowels and around 16 consonants. The usage of some of these phonemes tend to vary in some words by dialect or village, as well as exhibiting some free variation from person to person, but there are enough invariant words across the language area to establish the core phonemes.

=== Consonants ===
Consonant phonemes
		Labial	Alveolar	Palatal	Velar	Glottal
Nasal		m	n		ŋ	ʔ
Plosive	voiceless	p	t		k	
Plosive	voiced	b	d		ɡ	
Affricate				t͡ʃ		
Fricative	voiceless		s			h
Fricative	voiced					
Approximant		w		j		
Trill			r			

A voiced alveolar lateral approximant ⟨l⟩ also occurs phonetically in Solos (rarely), but has so far been analyzed as an allophone of /n/, and almost exclusively occurs in free variation with ⟨n⟩ and/or in borrowed words. The irony that the name of the language, Solos, contains an ⟨l⟩ is probably due to the fact that the nearby closely related languages have an /l/ phoneme.

The /b/ phoneme also has an allophone ⟨β⟩, which is a voiced bilabial fricative. It primarily appears when /b/ occurs between two vowels, although it does rarely occur word-initially in free variation with ⟨b⟩.

=== Vowels ===
Solos has a relatively straight-forward five-vowel system.

Vowel phonemes
	Front	Back
Close	i	u
Mid	e	ɔ
Open	a	

There is some variability in the produced vowel sounds, but within each vowel phoneme the produced phonetic range tends to center on the base phonetic sound described in the chart. All of these vowels can also be part of diphthongs, although it is difficult to differentiate between true diphthongs and separate syllables when two or more vowel sounds are adjacent.
