= Askopan language =

Rotokas language spoken in Papua New Guinea

Askopan
- Eivo
- Native to: Papua New Guinea
- Region: Bougainville
- Native speakers: (5,000 cited 2000)
- Language family: North Bougainville: Askopan–Rotokas; Askopan

Language codes
- ISO 639-3: eiv
- Glottolog: asko1238

Askopan (a.k.a. Eivo) is a North Bougainville language spoken on Bougainville, an island to the east of New Guinea. It is one of several languages in the area that go by the name Eivo.
