= Bana Rural LLG =

Local-level government in Papua New Guinea

- Country: Papua New Guinea
- Province: Autonomous Region of Bougainville

Population (2011 census)
  - Total: 22,457
- Time zone: UTC+10 (AEST)

Bana Rural LLG is a local-level government (LLG) of the Autonomous Region of Bougainville, Papua New Guinea.

== Wards ==
- 01. Baitsi
- 02. Lamane East
- 03. Lamane South
- 04. Telepi
- 05. Tomau
- 06. Velipe
- 07. Gooreh
- 08. Toberaki
