= Voiced palatal approximant =

Type of consonant used in many spoken languages

j

ʝ᫛
- IPA number: 153

Audio sample
- source · help

Encoding
- Entity (decimal): &#106;
- Unicode (hex): U+006A
- X-SAMPA: j
- Braille: ⠚ (braille pattern dots-245)
Image

A voiced palatal approximant is a type of consonant used in many spoken languages. It is familiar to English-speakers as the ⟨y⟩ sound in young.

The symbol in the International Phonetic Alphabet that represents this sound is ⟨j⟩; the equivalent symbol in the Americanist phonetic notation is ⟨y⟩. If it is necessary to avoid the implication that the approximant is spread as its vocalic equivalent [i] is, it may instead be transcribed ⟨ʝ̞⟩ or ⟨ʝ᫛⟩ (or ⟨ʝ˕⟩, which is now dated). When this sound occurs in the form of a palatal glide it is frequently, but not exclusively, denoted as a superscript j ⟨ʲ⟩ in IPA.

This sound is traditionally called a yod, after its name in Hebrew. This is reflected in the names of certain phonological changes, such as yod-dropping and yod-coalescence.

A palatal approximant is often the semivocalic equivalent of a close front unrounded vowel [i]. They alternate with each other in certain languages, such as French, and in the diphthongs of some languages as ⟨j⟩ and ⟨i̯⟩, with the non-syllabic diacritic used in some phonetic transcription systems to represent the same sound.

== Phonetic ambiguity and transcription usage ==
Some languages, however, have a palatal approximant that is unspecified for rounding and so cannot be considered the semivocalic equivalent of either [i] or its rounded counterpart, [y], which would normally correspond to [ɥ]. An example is Spanish, which distinguishes two palatal approximants: a semivowel approximant [j], which is always unrounded (and is a phonological vowel - an allophone of /i/), and a spirant approximant unspecified for rounding, [ʝ̞] (which is a phonological consonant). Eugenio Martínez Celdrán describes the difference between them as follows (with audio examples added):

[j] is shorter and is usually a merely transitory sound. It can only exist together with a full vowel and does not appear in syllable onset. [On the other hand,] [ʝ̞] has a lower amplitude, mainly in F2. It can only appear in syllable onset. It is not noisy either articulatorily or perceptually. [ʝ̞] can vary towards [ʝ] in emphatic pronunciations, having noise (turbulent airstream). (...) There is a further argument through which we can establish a clear difference between [j] and [ʝ̞]: the first sound cannot be rounded, not even through co-articulation, whereas the second one is rounded before back vowels or the back semi-vowel. Thus, in words like viuda [ˈbjuða] 'widow', Dios [ˈdjos] 'God', vio [ˈbjo] 's/he saw', etc., the semi-vowel [j] is unrounded; if it were rounded, a sound that does not exist in Spanish, [ɥ], would appear. On the other hand, [ʝ̞] is unspecified as far as rounding is concerned and it is assimilated to the labial vowel context: rounded with rounded vowels, e.g. ayuda [aˈʝ̞ʷuð̞a] 'help', coyote [koˈʝ̞ʷote] 'coyote', hoyuelo [oˈʝ̞ʷwelo] 'dimple', etc., and unrounded with unrounded vowels: payaso [paˈʝ̞aso] 'clown', ayer [aˈʝ̞eɾ] 'yesterday'.

Celdrán also considers that "the IPA shows a lack of precision in the treatment it gives to approximants, if we take into account our understanding of the phonetics of Spanish. [ʝ̞] and [j] are two different segments, but they have to be labelled as voiced palatal approximant consonants. I think that the former is a real consonant, whereas the latter is a semi-consonant, as it has traditionally been called in Spanish, or a semi-vowel, if preferred. The IPA, though, classifies it as a consonant."

There is a parallel problem with transcribing voiced velar approximants.

In the writing systems used for most languages of Central, Northern, and Eastern Europe, the letter j denotes a palatal approximant, as in German Jahr 'year', which is followed by IPA. Although it may be seen as counterintuitive for English-speakers, there are a few words with that orthographical spelling in certain loanwords in English like Hebrew "hallelujah" and German "Jägermeister".

In grammars of Ancient Greek, a palatal approximant, which was lost early in the history of Greek, is sometimes written as ⟨ι̯⟩, an iota with the inverted breve below, which is the nonsyllabic diacritic or marker of a semivowel.

== Features ==
Features of a voiced palatal approximant:

- Its manner of articulation is approximant, which means it is produced by narrowing the vocal tract at the place of articulation, but not enough to produce a turbulent airstream. The most common type of this approximant is glide or semivowel. The term glide emphasizes the characteristic of movement (or 'glide') of [j] from the [i] vowel position to a following vowel position. The term semivowel emphasizes that, although the sound is vocalic in nature, it is not 'syllabic' (it does not form the nucleus of a syllable). For a description of the spirant approximant variant used e.g. in Spanish, see § Phonetic ambiguity and transcription usage.
- Its place of articulation is palatal, which means it is articulated with the middle or back part of the tongue raised to the hard palate. The otherwise identical post-palatal variant is articulated slightly behind the hard palate, making it sound slightly closer to the velar [ɰ].
- Its phonation is voiced, which means the vocal cords vibrate during the articulation.
- It is an oral consonant, which means that air is not allowed to escape through the nose.
- It is a median consonant, which means it is produced by directing the airstream down the midline of the tongue, rather than to the sides.
- Its airstream mechanism is pulmonic, which means it is articulated by pushing air only with the intercostal muscles and abdominal muscles, as in most speech sounds.

== Occurrence ==
=== Palatal ===
Language		Word	IPA	Meaning	Notes
Adyghe		ятӀэ / yat'a	[jatʼa]	'dirt'	
Afrikaans		ja	[jɑː]	'yes'	See Afrikaans phonology
Arabic	Standard	يوم / yawm	[jawm]	'day'	See Arabic phonology
Aragonese		caye	[ˈkaʝ̞e̞]	'falls'	Unspecified for rounding approximant consonant; the language also features an unrounded palatal approximant semivowel (which may replace /ʝ̞/ before /e/).
Armenian	Eastern	յուղ / yuq	[juʁ]	'fat'	
Assamese		মানৱীয়তা / manowiyota	[manɔwijɔta]	'humanity'	
Assyrian		ܝܡܐ / yama	[jaːma]	'sea'	
Azerbaijani		yuxu	[juχu]	'dream'	
Basque		bai	[baj]	'yes'	
Bengali		নয়ন / noyon	[nɔjon]	'eye'	A phonetic merger of the non-syllabic front vowels /i̯ e̯/. See Bengali phonology
Breton		yod	['jot]	'porridge'	
Bulgarian		майка / majka	[ˈmajkɐ]	'mother'	See Bulgarian phonology
Catalan	Most dialects	baies	[ˈbäjəs]	'berries'	See Catalan phonology
Catalan	Some dialects	jo	[ˈjɔ]	'I'	See Catalan phonology
Chechen		ялх / yalx	[jalx]	'six'	
Chinese	Cantonese	日 / jat9	[jɐt˨ʔ]	'day'	See Cantonese phonology
Chinese	Mandarin	鸭 (鴨) / yā	[ja˥]	'duck'	See Mandarin phonology
Chuvash		йывӑҫ / yıvëş	[jɯʋəɕ̬]	'tree'	
Czech		je	[jɛ]	'is'	See Czech phonology
Danish		jeg	[jɑ]	'I'	See Danish phonology
Dutch	Standard	ja	[jaː]	'yes'	Frequently realized as a fricative [ʝ], especially in emphatic speech. See Dutch phonology
English		you	[juː]	'you'	See English phonology
Esperanto		jaro	[jaro]	'year'	See Esperanto phonology
Estonian		jalg	[ˈjɑlɡ]	'leg'	See Estonian phonology
Finnish		jalka	[ˈjɑlkɑ]	'leg'	See Finnish phonology
French		yeux	[jø]	'eyes'	See French phonology
German	Standard	Jacke	[ˈjäkə]	'jacket'	Also described as a fricative [ʝ] and a sound variable between a fricative and an approximant. See Standard German phonology
Hebrew		ילד / yeled	[ˈjeled]	'kid'	See Modern Hebrew phonology
Hindustani		यान / یان / yán	[jäːn]	'vehicle'	See Hindustani phonology
Hungarian		játék	[jaːteːk]	'game'	See Hungarian phonology
Irish		ghearrfadh	[ˈjɑːɾˠhəx]	'would cut'	See Irish phonology
Ingush		ялат / jalat	['jalat]	'grain'	See Ingush phonology
Italian		ione	[ˈjoːne]	'ion'	See Italian phonology
Jalapa Mazatec					Contrasts voiceless /j̊/, plain voiced /j/ and glottalized voiced /ȷ̃/ approximants.
Japanese		焼く / yaku	[jaku͍]	'to bake'	See Japanese phonology
Kabardian		йи / yi	[ji]	'game'	
Kazakh		Яғни / iağni	[jɑʁnəj]	'so'	
Khmer		យំ / yom	[jom]	'to cry'	See Khmer phonology
Korean		여섯 / yeoseot	[jʌsʌt̚]	'six'	See Korean phonology
Latin		iacere	[ˈjakɛrɛ]	'to throw'	See Latin spelling and pronunciation
Lithuanian		ji	[jɪ]	'she'	Also described as a fricative [ʝ]. See Lithuanian phonology
Macedonian		крај / kraj	[kraj]	'end'	See Macedonian phonology
Malay		sayang	[sajaŋ]	'love'	
Malayalam		പായ/paya	[paːjɐ]	'mat'	See Malayalam phonology
Maltese		jiekol	[jɪɛkol]	'he eats'	
Mapudungun		kayu	[kɜˈjʊ]	'six'	May be a fricative [ʝ] instead.
Marathi		यश / yaš	[jəʃ]	'success'	
Nepali		याम / yam	[jäm]	'season'	See Nepali phonology
Norwegian	Urban East	gi	[jiː]	'to give'	May be a fricative [ʝ] instead. See Norwegian phonology
Odia		ସମୟ / samaya	[sɔmɔjɔ]	'time'	
Persian		یزد / Yäzd	[jæzd]	'Yazd'	See Persian phonology
Polish		jutro	[ˈjut̪rɔ]	'tomorrow'	See Polish phonology
Portuguese		boia	[ˈbɔjɐ]	'buoy', 'float'	Allophone of both /i/ and /ʎ/, as well as a very common epenthetic sound before coda sibilants in some dialects. See Portuguese phonology
Punjabi		ਯਾਰ / yár	[jäːɾ]	'friend'	
Romanian		iar	[jar]	'again'	See Romanian phonology
Russian		яма / yama	[ˈjämə]	'pit'	See Russian phonology
Serbo-Croatian		југ / jug	[jûɡ]	'South'	See Serbo-Croatian phonology
Slovak		jesť	[jɛ̝sc]	'to eat'	See Slovak phonology
Slovene		jaz	[ˈjʌ̂s̪]	'I'	
Solos		yas	[jas]	'up'	See Alphabet section in Solos language
Spanish	Standard	ayer	[aˈʝ̞e̞ɾ]	'yesterday'	Unspecified for rounding approximant consonant; the language also features an unrounded palatal approximant semivowel. Contrast with /j/. See Spanish phonology
Spanish	Standard	tierra	[ˈt̪je.ra]	'earth'	Unspecified for rounding approximant consonant; the language also features an unrounded palatal approximant semivowel. Contrast with /j/. See Spanish phonology
Spanish	Rioplatense	hielo	[ˈje.lo]	'ice'	Unspecified for rounding approximant consonant; the language also features an unrounded palatal approximant semivowel. Contrast with /j/. See Spanish phonology
Swedish		jag	[ˈjɑːɡ]	'I'	May be realized as a palatal fricative [ʝ] instead. See Swedish phonology
Tagalog		maya	[ˈmajɐ]	'sparrow'	
Tamil		யானை	[ˈjaːnaɪ]	'elephant'	See Tamil phonology
Telugu		యాతన / yatana	[jaːtana]	'agony'	
Turkish		yol	[jo̞ɫ̪]	'way'	See Turkish phonology
Turkmen		ýüpek	[jypek]	'silk'	
Ubykh		ајәушқӏa / ajëwšq'a	[ajəwʃqʼa]	'you did it'	See Ubykh phonology
Ukrainian		їжак / ïžak	[jiˈʒɑk]	'hedgehog'	See Ukrainian phonology
Vietnamese	Southern dialects	de	[jɛ]	'cinnamon'	Corresponds to northern /z/. See Vietnamese phonology
Washo		dayáʔ	[daˈjaʔ]	'leaf'	Contrasts voiceless /j̊/ and voiced /j/ approximants.
Welsh		iaith	[jai̯θ]	'language'	See Welsh phonology
West Frisian		jas	[jɔs]	'coat'	See West Frisian phonology
Zapotec	Tilquiapan	yan	[jaŋ]	'neck'	

=== Post-palatal ===
Voiced post-palatal or pre-velar approximant

j᫢

ɰ᫈

ȷ̈

Audio sample
- source · help

There is also a post-palatal or pre-velar approximant in some languages, which is articulated more back than the place of articulation of the prototypical palatal approximant but less far back than the prototypical velar approximant. It can be considered the semivocalic equivalent of the close central unrounded vowel [ɨ]. The International Phonetic Alphabet does not have a separate symbol for that sound, but it can be transcribed as ⟨j̠⟩, ⟨j᫢⟩ (a retracted ⟨j⟩), ⟨ɰ̟⟩ or ⟨ɰ᫈⟩ (an advanced ⟨ɰ⟩). Other possible transcriptions include ⟨ȷ̈⟩ (a centralized ⟨j⟩), ⟨ɰ̈⟩ (a centralized ⟨ɰ⟩), and ⟨ɨ̯⟩ (a non-syllabic ⟨ɨ⟩). The para-IPA symbol ⟨ɉ⟩ (a barred ⟨j⟩) may also be used to represent this approximant.

Language		Word	IPA	Meaning	Notes
Spanish		seguir	[se̞ˈɣ̞᫈iɾ]	'to follow'	Lenited allophone of /ɡ/ before front vowels; typically transcribed in IPA with ⟨ɣ⟩. See Spanish phonology
Turkish	Standard prescriptive	düğün	[ˈd̪y̠ȷ̈y̠n̪]	'wedding'	Either post-palatal or palatal; phonetic realization of /ɣ/ (also transcribed as /ɰ/) before front vowels. See Turkish phonology

=== Nasal ===
Nasalized voiced palatal approximant

ȷ̃

Audio sample
- source · help

Encoding
- X-SAMPA: j~

A nasalized voiced palatal approximant is a type of consonantal sound used in some spoken languages. The symbol in the International Phonetic Alphabet that represents this sound is ⟨j̃⟩.

The sound is a common realization of /j/ before nasal vowels in many languages of West Africa that do not have a phonemic distinction between voiced nasal and oral stops, such as Yoruba, Ewe and Bini languages.

Language		Word	IPA	Meaning	Notes
Nheengatu		nheẽ	[j̃ẽʔẽ]	'to speak'	Influenced Brazilian Portuguese ⟨nh⟩ sound. Sometimes written with ⟨ñ⟩
Hindustani		संयम / sanyama	[səj̃jəm]	'patience'	Allophone of /n/ before [j]. See Hindustani phonology
Kaingang		[j̃ũ]		'brave'	Possible word-initial realization of /j/ before a nasal vowel.
Lombard		bisògn de	[biˈzɔj̃ d̪e]	'need for (something)'	Allophone of /ɲ/ before a consonant. See Lombard phonology
Louisiana Creole		sinñin	[sɛ̃j̃ɛ̃]	'bleed'	Intervocalic allophone of /ɲ/
Marathi		संयुक्त / saṁyukta	[səj̃jukt̪ə]	'united'	Realisation of anuswara (ṁ) preceding य (y). See Marathi phonology
Polish		państwo	[ˈpãj̃stfɔ]	'state, country'	Allophone of /ɲ/ before fricatives. See Polish phonology
Portuguese	Brazilian	sonho	[ˈsõj̃ʊ]	'dream'	Allophone of /ɲ/ between vowels, nasalizes the preceding vowel. Language's original /ɲ/ sound. See Portuguese phonology
Portuguese	Most dialects	cães	[kɐ̃j̃s]	'dogs'	Allophone of /i/ after nasal vowels.
Portuguese	Some dialects	me ame!	[ˈmj̃ɐ̃mi]	'love me!'	Non-syllabic allophone of /i/ between nasal sounds.
Shipibo					Allophone of /j/ after nasal vowels.
Spanish	Zwolle-Ebarb	año	[ˈãj̃o]	'year'	Allophone of /ɲ/ between vowels, nasalizing the preceding vowel.
Spanish	Other dialects, occasional in rapid, unguarded speech	niños	[ˈnij̃os]	'kids'	Allophone of /ɲ/. Because nasality is retained and there is no potential merger with any other Spanish phonemes, this process is rarely noticed, and its geographical distribution has never been determined.
Sakha		айыы	[aȷ̃ɯː]	'sin, transgression'	/ȷ̃/ is not distinguished from /j/ in the orthography.

== See also ==
- Palatal lateral approximant
- Index of phonetics articles

== Notes ==
Place →	Labial					Coronal										Dorsal					Laryngeal			
Manner ↓	Bilabial		Labiodental		Linguolabial		Dental		Alveolar		Postalveolar		Retroflex		(Alveolo-)palatal		Velar		Uvular		Pharyngeal/epiglottal		Glottal	
Nasal	m̥	m	ɱ̊	ɱ		n̼	n̪̊	n̪	n̥	n	n̠̊	n̠	ɳ̊	ɳ	ɲ̊	ɲ	ŋ̊	ŋ	ɴ̥	ɴ				
Plosive	p	b	p̪	b̪	t̼	d̼	t̪	d̪	t	d			ʈ	ɖ	c	ɟ	k	ɡ	q	ɢ	ʡ		ʔ	
Sibilant affricate							t̪s̪	d̪z̪	ts	dz	t̠ʃ	d̠ʒ	tʂ	dʐ	tɕ	dʑ								
Non-sibilant affricate	pɸ	bβ	p̪f	b̪v			t̪θ	d̪ð	tɹ̝̊	dɹ̝	t̠ɹ̠̊˔	d̠ɹ̠˔			cç	ɟʝ	kx	ɡɣ	qχ	ɢʁ	ʡʜ	ʡʢ	ʔh	
Sibilant fricative							s̪	z̪	s	z	ʃ	ʒ	ʂ	ʐ	ɕ	ʑ								
Non-sibilant fricative	ɸ	β	f	v	θ̼	ð̼	θ	ð	θ̠	ð̠	ɹ̠̊˔	ɹ̠˔	ɻ̊˔	ɻ˔	ç	ʝ	x	ɣ	χ	ʁ	ħ	ʕ	h	ɦ
Approximant		β̞		ʋ				ð̞		ɹ		ɹ̠		ɻ		j		ɰ						˷
Tap/flap		ⱱ̟		ⱱ					ɾ̥	ɾ			ɽ̊	ɽ						ɢ̆		ʡ̆		
Trill	ʙ̥	ʙ							r̥	r		r̠	ɽ̊r̥	ɽr					ʀ̥	ʀ	ʜ	ʢ		
Lateral affricate									tɬ	dɮ			tꞎ	d𝼅	c𝼆	ɟʎ̝	k𝼄	ɡʟ̝						
Lateral fricative							ɬ̪		ɬ	ɮ			ꞎ	𝼅	𝼆	ʎ̝	𝼄	ʟ̝						
Lateral approximant								l̪	l̥	l		l̠	ɭ̊	ɭ	ʎ̥	ʎ	ʟ̥	ʟ		ʟ̠				
Lateral tap/flap									ɺ̥	ɺ			𝼈̊	𝼈		ʎ̆		ʟ̆						

		BL	LD	D	A	PA	RF	P	V	U
Implosive	Voiced	ɓ			ɗ		ᶑ	ʄ	ɠ	ʛ
Implosive	Voiceless	ɓ̥			ɗ̥		ᶑ̊	ʄ̊	ɠ̊	ʛ̥
Ejective	Stop	pʼ			tʼ		ʈʼ	cʼ	kʼ	qʼ
Ejective	Affricate		p̪fʼ	tθʼ	tsʼ	tʃʼ	tʂʼ	tɕʼ	kxʼ	qχʼ
Ejective	Fricative	ɸʼ	fʼ	θʼ	sʼ	ʃʼ	ʂʼ	ɕʼ	xʼ	χʼ
Ejective	Lateral affricate				tɬʼ			c𝼆ʼ	k𝼄ʼ	q𝼄ʼ
Ejective	Lateral fricative				ɬʼ					
Click (top: velar; bottom: uvular)	Tenuis	kʘ qʘ		kǀ qǀ	kǃ qǃ		k𝼊 q𝼊	kǂ qǂ		
Click (top: velar; bottom: uvular)	Voiced	ɡʘ ɢʘ		ɡǀ ɢǀ	ɡǃ ɢǃ		ɡ𝼊 ɢ𝼊	ɡǂ ɢǂ		
Click (top: velar; bottom: uvular)	Nasal	ŋʘ ɴʘ		ŋǀ ɴǀ	ŋǃ ɴǃ		ŋ𝼊 ɴ𝼊	ŋǂ ɴǂ	ʞ	
Click (top: velar; bottom: uvular)	Tenuis lateral				kǁ qǁ					
Click (top: velar; bottom: uvular)	Voiced lateral				ɡǁ ɢǁ					
Click (top: velar; bottom: uvular)	Nasal lateral				ŋǁ ɴǁ					
