= Bougainville Island =

Island in Papua New Guinea

Bougainville
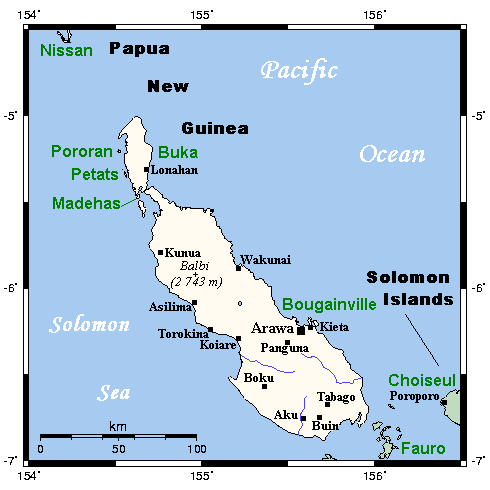
- Bougainville and neighbouring islands

- Location within Papua New Guinea
- Etymology: Named for Louis Antoine de Bougainville

Geography
- Location: Melanesia
- Coordinates: 6°14′40″S 155°23′02″E
- Archipelago: Solomon Islands
- Area: 9,384 km^{2} (3,623 sq mi)
- Highest elevation: 2,715 m (8907 ft)
- Highest point: Mount Balbi

Administration
- Papua New Guinea
- Province: Autonomous Region of Bougainville

Demographics
- Population: ~249,000 (Buka Island included)
- Pop. density: 32.19/km^{2} (83.37/sq mi)

Additional information
- Time zone: UTC (UTC+11)

Bougainville Island (/ˈboʊɡənvɪl/, /ˈbuːɡənvɪl/; Tok Pisin: Bogenvil) is the main island of the Autonomous Region of Bougainville, which is part of Papua New Guinea. Its land area is 9,384 km^{2} (3,623 sq mi). The highest point is Mount Balbi, on the main island, at 2,715 m (8,907 ft).

The much smaller Buka Island, c. 500 km^{2} (190 sq mi), lies to the north, across the 400–500-metre-wide (1,300–1,600 ft) Buka Strait. Even though the strait is narrow, there is no bridge across it, but there is a regular ferry service between the key settlements on either side. The main airstrip in the north is in the town of Buka. Buka has an outcropping that is 175 km (109 mi) from New Ireland. Among the large islands of Papua New Guinea, New Ireland is the closest to Buka.

Bougainville is the largest island in the Solomon Islands archipelago. It was previously the main landmass in the North Solomons, which were associated with the German Empire. Most of the islands in this archipelago (which are primarily concentrated in the southern and eastern portions of it) are part of the politically independent Solomon Islands. Two of these islands—the closely connected Shortland Islands—are less than 9 km (5.6 mi) south or southeast of Bougainville, and about 30 km (19 mi) west of Choiseul, with Poroporo facing Bougainville.

In a 2019 referendum, the citizens of Bougainville voted to become independent from Papua New Guinea by 2027, but the referendum was non-binding on the government of Papua New Guinea. In July 2026, the government of Bougainville set out a timeline for self-government between 2027 and 2030, followed by full independence on 1 September 2030.

== History ==
=== Early history ===
During the Last Ice Age, present-day Bougainville Island was part of a single landmass known as "Greater Bougainville", which spanned from the northern tip of Buka Island to the Nggela Islands. The earliest evidence of human settlement is at Kilu Cave on Buka Island, where the earliest remains are from 26,700 to 18,100 BCE. The first settlers were Melanesian people, likely related to modern Papuans and Indigenous Australians. In the 2nd millennium BCE, Austronesian people arrived, bringing with them domesticated pigs, chickens, dogs, and obsidian tools.

The first European contact with Bougainville was in 1768, when the French explorer Louis Antoine de Bougainville arrived and named the main island after himself.

British and American whaling ships visited the island for provisions, water, and wood in the 19th century. The first on record was the Roscoe in 1822, and the last was Palmetto in 1881.

In 1899 the German Empire laid claim to Bougainville, annexing it into German New Guinea. Christian missionaries arrived on the island in 1902.

During World War I (1914–1918), Australia occupied German New Guinea, including Bougainville. It became part of the Australian Territory of New Guinea under a League of Nations mandate in 1920.

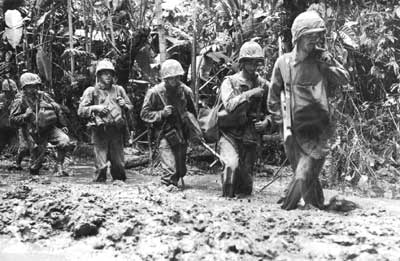
United States Marines on Bougainville (November 1943)

In 1942, during World War II, Japan invaded the island, but Allied forces launched the Bougainville campaign to regain control of the island in 1943.

On 18 April 1943, on Bougainville Island, during the Pacific War, the Japanese admiral, commander-in-chief of Combined Fleet Isoroku Yamamoto, died after his plane was attacked by US fighter planes and crashed into the jungle.

Despite heavy bombardments, the Japanese garrisons remained on the island until 1945. Following the war, the Territory of New Guinea, including Bougainville, returned to Australian control.

=== Attempts at independence ===
In 1949, the Territory of New Guinea, including Bougainville, merged with the Australian Territory of Papua, forming the Territory of Papua and New Guinea, a United Nations Trust Territory under Australian administration. On 9 September 1975, the Parliament of Australia passed the Papua New Guinea Independence Act 1975. On 11 September 1975, Bougainville declared itself the Republic of the North Solomons. Though it was later absorbed politically into Papua New Guinea.

Between 1988 and 1998, the Bougainville Civil War claimed over 15,000 lives. Peace talks brokered by New Zealand began in 1997 and led to autonomy. A multinational Peace Monitoring Group (PMG) under Australian leadership was deployed. In 2001, a peace agreement was signed, including the promise of a referendum on independence from Papua New Guinea. The referendum was held in November and December 2019, with 98.31% of voters choosing independence, and a turnout of 87.38%. Results were not contested by any parties.

The referendum was non-binding, and was followed by consultation between the Bougainville and PNG governments. Agreement was reached that Bougainville would achieve independence and sovereignty no sooner than 2025 and no later than 2027, however this requires ratification from the national parliament and the Papuan prime minister James Marape has not explicitly committed to Bougainville becoming separate from PNG. In March 2025, the Bougainville Leaders Consultation Forum recommended that the date of independence be set for 1 September 2027. In July 2026, the Forum set 1 September 2027 as the date for self-governance, to be followed by full independence on 1 September 2030.

== Geography ==
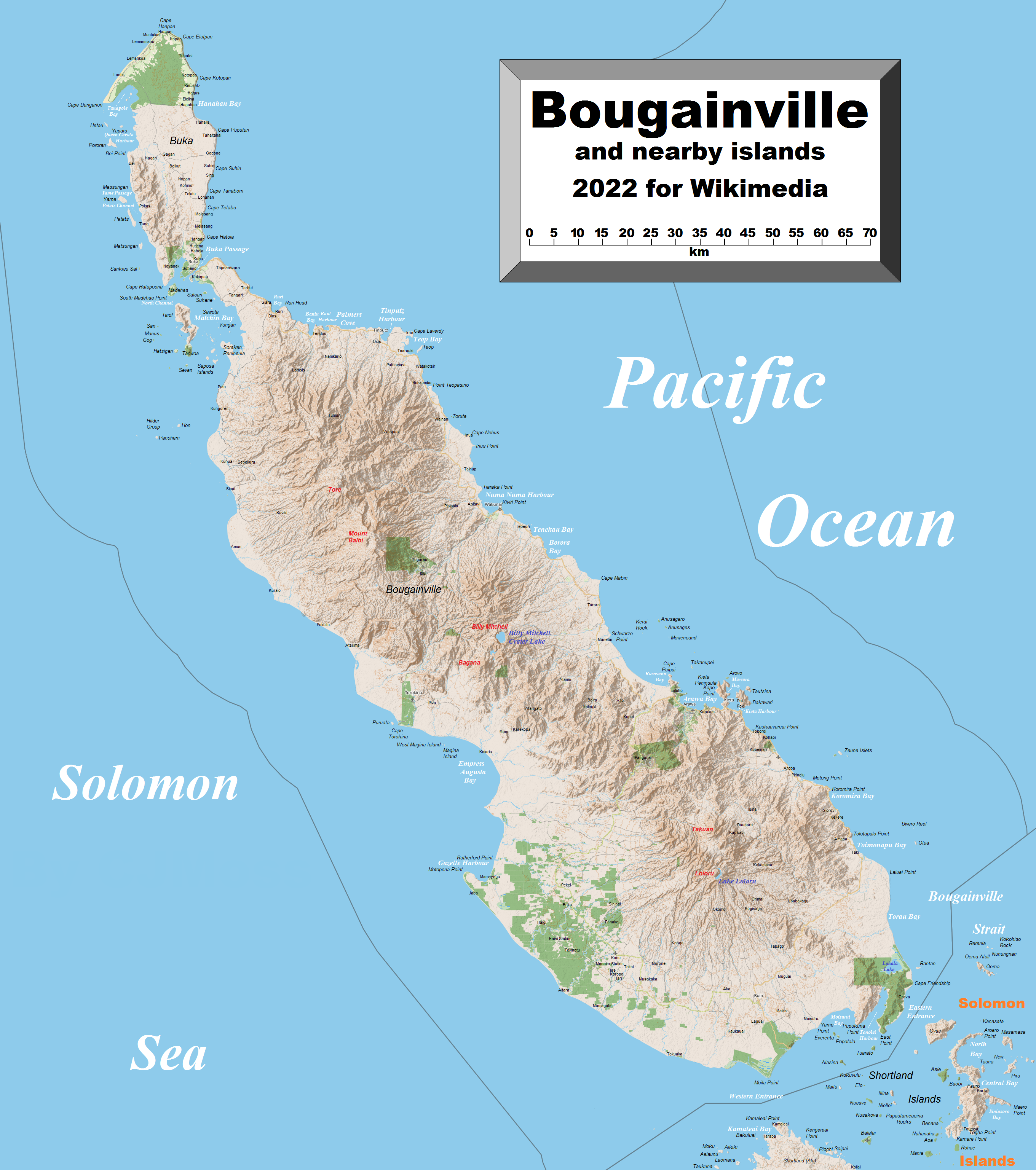
Map of Bougainville Island and Buka island

Bougainville is the largest island of the Solomon Islands archipelago. It is part of the Solomon Islands rain forests ecoregion. Bougainville and the nearby island of Buka are a single landmass separated by a deep 300-metre (980 ft) wide strait. The island has an area of 9,000 km^{2} (3,500 sq mi), and there are several active, dormant or inactive volcanoes that can rise to 2,400 m (7,900 ft). Bagana (1,750 metres [5,740 ft]) in the north central part of Bougainville is conspicuously active, spewing out gas that is visible for many kilometres. In 2013, a magnitude 6.4 earthquake was detected on the Bougainville Island; its epicenter was located 57 kilometers (35.4 miles) south of Panguna, a town on Bougainville Island.

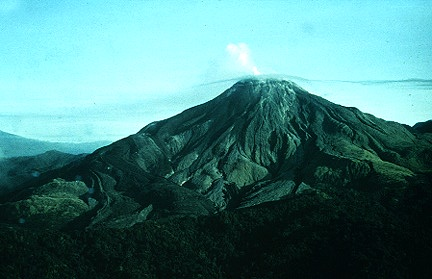
Bagana volcano

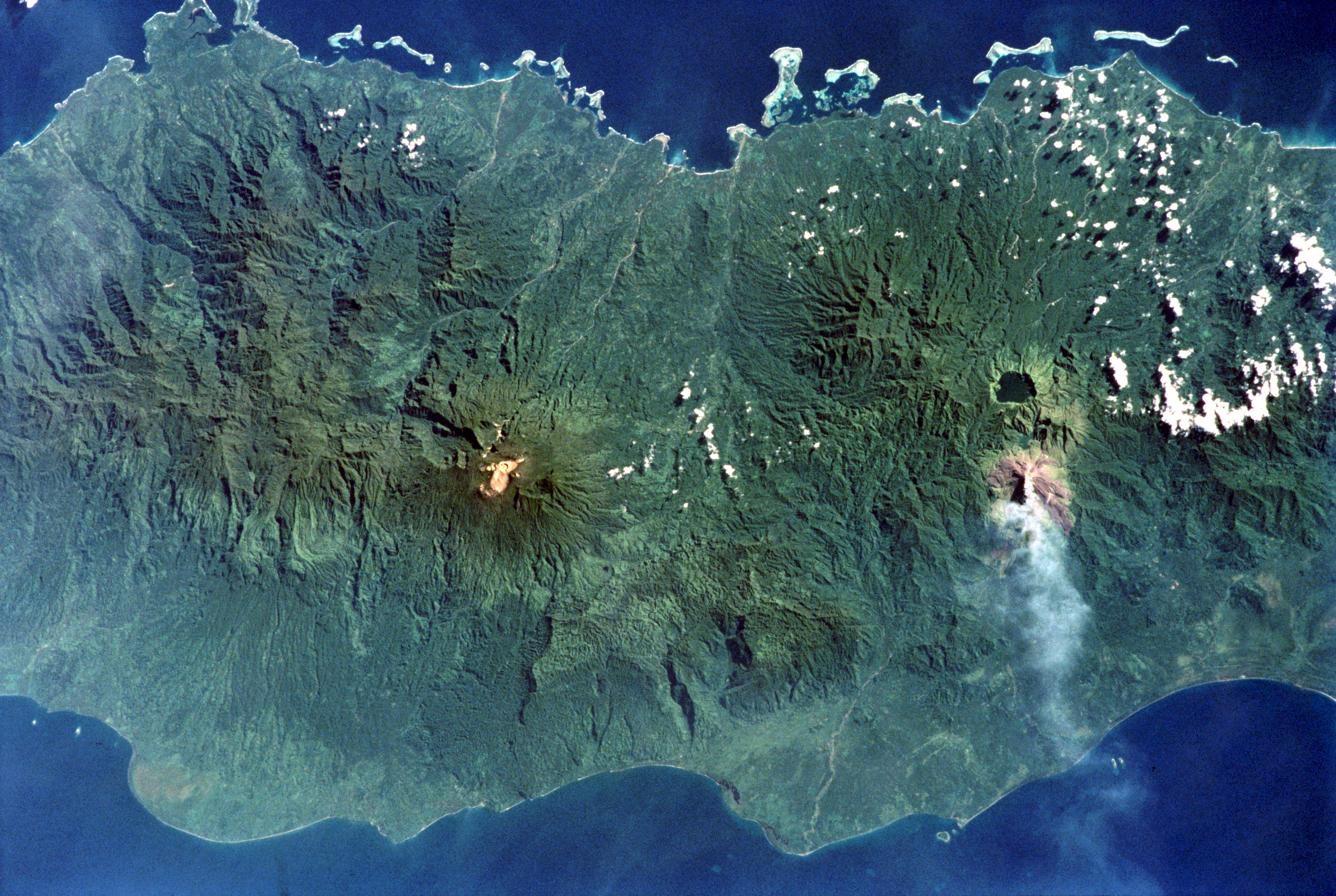
Northern part of the island

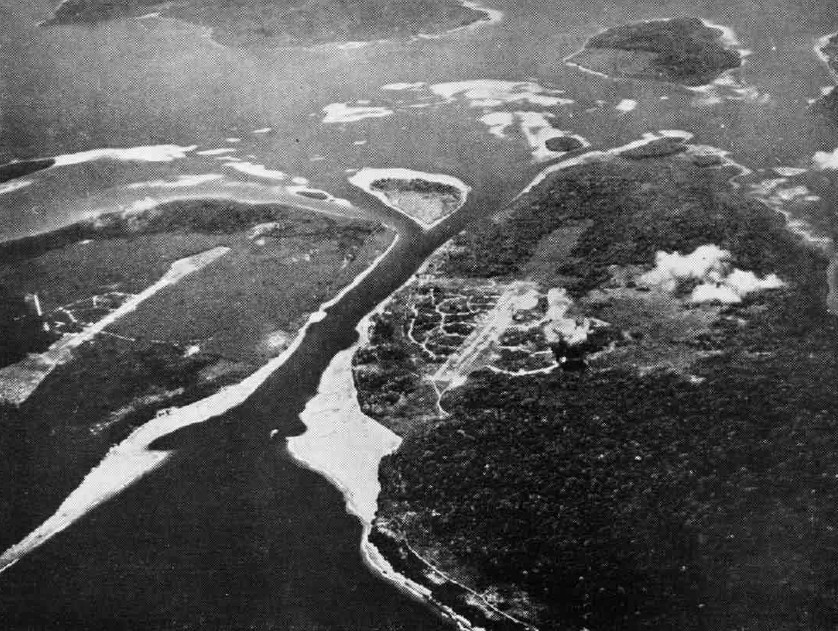
Buka Passage (1944)

== Ecology ==
Bougainville Island is primarily forested. Copper mining on the island by a Rio Tinto-owned mining operation in Panguna was known for their environmental impacts due to heavy metals. More recently, deforestation to feed the growing population has affected the flow of many rivers on the island. The United Nations Environment Programme has offered to facilitate the cleanup of the Panguna mine and explore reopening it with more stringent environmental standards.

== Climate ==
Bougainville Island has a tropical rainforest climate (Af on Köppen classification). The driest month is February.

Climate data for Bougainville
Month	Jan	Feb	Mar	Apr	May	Jun	Jul	Aug	Sep	Oct	Nov	Dec	Year
Mean daily maximum °C (°F)	32 (89)	32 (89)	31 (88)	31 (87)	31 (87)	31 (87)	30 (86)	31 (87)	31 (87)	30 (86)	31 (88)	31 (88)	31 (87)
Mean daily minimum °C (°F)	22 (72)	22 (71)	23 (73)	22 (72)	22 (71)	22 (71)	22 (71)	22 (71)	22 (71)	22 (71)	22 (72)	23 (73)	22 (72)
Average precipitation mm (inches)	560 (22.2)	190 (7.5)	370 (14.7)	290 (11.4)	280 (11.1)	240 (9.5)	510 (19.9)	320 (12.7)	350 (13.9)	580 (22.9)	420 (16.4)	490 (19.2)	4,610 (181.4)
Source: Weatherbase

== Economy ==
Bougainville has one of the world's largest copper deposits, which has been under development since 1972. The Panguna mine is estimated to have one billion tonnes of copper ore and 12 million ounces of gold. It was later shut down in a revolution against the Australian-run mine.

== Demographics ==
=== Religion ===
The majority of people on Bougainville are Christian, an estimated 75–80% being Roman Catholic as of 2015, and a substantial minority belonging to the United Church of Papua New Guinea and the Seventh-day Adventist Church.

=== Languages ===
There are many indigenous languages in Bougainville Province, belonging to three language families. The languages of the northern end of the island, and some scattered around the coast, belong to the Austronesian family. The languages of the north-central and southern lobes of Bougainville Island belong to the North and South Bougainville families.

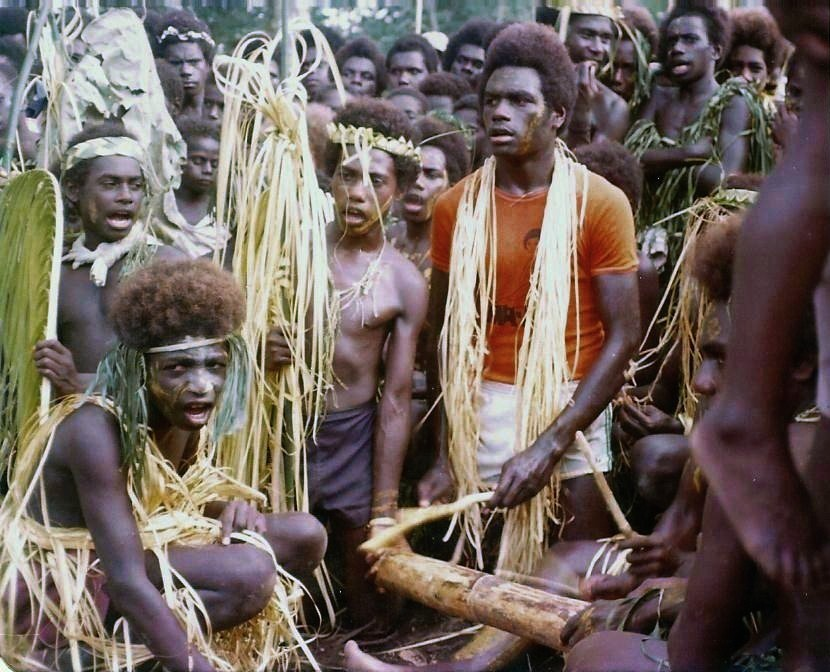
Buka men performing at a Buin folk festival

The most widely spoken Austronesian language is Halia and its dialects, spoken on the island of Buka and the Selau peninsula of Northern Bougainville. The larger languages, such as Nasioi, Korokoro Motuna, Terei, and Halia, are split into dialects that are not always mutually understandable. For general communication, most Bougainvilleans use Tok Pisin as a lingua franca. English and Tok Pisin are the languages of official business and government.

Other Austronesian languages include Nehan, Petats, Solos, Saposa (Taiof), Hahon and Tinputz, all spoken in the northern quarter of Bougainville, Buka and surrounding islands. These languages are closely related. Bannoni and Torau are Austronesian languages not closely related to the former, which are spoken in the coastal areas of central and south Bougainville. On the nearby Takuu Atoll, a Polynesian language is spoken, Takuu.

Non-Austronesian languages are spoken on the main island of Bougainville. These include Rotokas, a language with a very small inventory of phonemes, Eivo, Terei, Keriaka, Naasioi (Kieta), Nagovisi, Siwai (Motuna), Baitsi (sometimes considered a dialect of Siwai), and Uisai.

== Human rights ==
Cut off from the outside world for several years by a Papua New Guinean blockade during the civil war (1988–1998), the islanders suffered many deaths from a lack of medical resources.

A 2013 United Nations survey of 843 men found that 62% (530 respondents) of those have raped a woman or girl at least once, with 26% (217 respondents) of the men reported having raped a non-partner, whereas 9% (74 respondents) reported having committed gang rape. Additionally, the survey also found that 8% (67 respondents) of the men had raped other men or boys.

== In popular culture ==
The Coconut Revolution, a documentary about the struggle of the indigenous population to save their island from environmental destruction and gain independence, was made in 1999.

An Evergreen Island (2000), a film by Australian documentary filmmakers Amanda King and Fabio Cavadini of Frontyard Films, showed the ingenuity with which the Bougainvillean people survived for almost a decade (1989–1997) without trade or contact with the outside world because of the PNG military blockade.

Mr. Pip (2012) is a film by New Zealand director Andrew Adamson based on the book Mister Pip by New Zealand author Lloyd Jones. The film is set in Bougainville in the 1980s, during the civil war and blockades, and the cast is mostly Bougainvilleans.

== See also ==
- Battle of Empress Augusta Bay
- Bougainville campaign
- Bougainville Copper
- Bougainville Revolutionary Army
- Bougainvillea
- Empress Augusta Bay
- Francis Ona
- List of birds of the Solomon Islands archipelago
- North Solomon Islands
- Solomon Archipelago
- The Bougainville Photoplay Project
