= Torau language =

Oceanic language spoken in Papua New Guinea

Torau
- Rorovana
- Region: Bougainville, Papua New Guinea
- Native speakers: (600 cited 1963)
- Language family: Austronesian: Malayo-Polynesian; Oceanic; Western; Meso-Melanesian; Northwest Solomonic; Mono–Uruavan; Torau

Language codes
- ISO 639-3: ttu
- Glottolog: tora1259

Torau is an Austronesian language spoken on the east coast of Bougainville, Papua New Guinea.
