= Torokina Rural LLG =

Local-level government in Papua New Guinea

- Country: Papua New Guinea
- Province: Autonomous Region of Bougainville

Population (2011 census)
  - Total: 6,267
- Time zone: UTC+10 (AEST)

Torokina Rural LLG is a local-level government (LLG) of the Autonomous Region of Bougainville, Papua New Guinea.

== Wards ==
- 01. Burue
- 02. Naghareghe
- 05. Atsinima
- 06. Rotokas
- 07. Eivo
