= Nehan language =

Austronesian language spoken in Papua New Guinea

Nehan
- Nissan, Nihan
- Native to: Papua New Guinea
- Region: Nissan Island
- Native speakers: 6,500 (2003)
- Language family: Austronesian: Malayo-Polynesian; Oceanic; Western; Meso-Melanesian; Northwest Solomonic; Nehan–Bougainville; Nehan

Language codes
- ISO 639-3: nsn
- Glottolog: neha1247

Nehan, also known as Nissan or Nihan, is an Austronesian language spoken on the Green Islands, north of Bougainville, Papua New Guinea.

== Dialects ==
Nehan has three dialects. Two are spoken on Nissan Island; Uanuleik, spoken by about 5000 people, and Sirouatan, spoken by about 1000 people. The other, spoken on Pinipel Island, is simply called Pinipel and is spoken by about 1000 people. The lexical similarity between Uanuleik and Pinipel is about 83%.

== Status ==
Nehan is the dominant language in the communities where it is spoken; most everyday communication is in the language, although Tok Pisin, the lingua franca of Papua New Guinea, is sometimes used. For example, Tok Pisin is used in some speeches at village meetings (occasionally in conjunction with Nehan in the same meeting, or same speech); at village court (formerly conducted primarily in Nehan, but now done in Tok Pisin by some speakers); at the large market at the government station, as well as with outsiders.

Most people who marry into Nehan communities learn the language and communicate using it, while others learn to understand it but use Tok Pisin while speaking instead.

Older speakers prefer to use Nehan in all cases, although they will use Tok Pisin if necessary.

== Phonology ==
=== Consonants ===
The following table shows Nehan's consonantal phonemes. Orthography that does not match the IPA symbol is indicated using brackets.

	Bilabial		Alveolar		Palatal	Velar		Glottal
Nasal	m		n			ŋ <ng>		
Plosive	p	b	t	d		k	ɡ	
Fricative			s					h
Rhotic			r					
Lateral			l					

- All plosives and fricatives, as well as /m/, have labialized allophones.
- /t/ and /k/ have palatalized allophones.

=== Vowels ===
The following table shows Nehan's vowel phonemes. Orthography that does not match the IPA symbol is indicated using brackets.

	Front	Central	Back
High	i		u
Open-mid	ɛ <e>		ɔ <o>
Low		a	

- /i/ and /u/ have the allophones [j] and [w].

All vowels can occur in lengthened form. Diphthongs are common — /a/ can be combined with any vowel, while /ɛ/ and /ɔ/ are often found with /i/ and /u/ — but clusters of vowels occurring in separate syllables from each other also occur.

=== Syllable structure ===
All consonants may occur either word-initially, medially or finally. Consonant clusters do not occur within a syllable, nor ever word-initially or finally, although there are no obvious restrictions on consonant clusters across a word boundary.

The most common syllable structure is CV (consonant-vowel), followed by CVC (although this structure is often the result of apocope). The last consonant of a CVC syllable can occur word-medially with no vowel following, as shown in the table. VC syllables are uncommon, and there are rare examples of V syllables in words consisting only of a vowel.

CV	CVC	VC	V
lo 'dog'	bak 'throw'	ut 'louse'	i (locative marker)
	mindal 'earring'	ok 'round worm'	a (article)

=== Stress ===
Stress primarily occurs on the second-to-last syllable; in words for which this is the case, the final vowel is silent. However, in words where stress instead occurs on the final syllable, the final vowel is pronounced. See the following table: (the "phonetic form" is what is actually being said, whereas the "phonemic form" is the underlying form of the word.)

English	Phonemic form	Phonetic form
'now'	/maˈnasa/	[mɑ.ˈnɑs]
'die'	/ˈmate/	[ˈmɑt]
'tell'	/hiˈre/	[hi.ˈrɛ]
'morning'	/liˈuo/	[li.ˈwɔ]
