= Saposa language =

Austronesian language

Saposa
- Fa Saposa
- Native to: Papua New Guinea
- Region: between Buka Island and Bougainville
- Native speakers: (1,400 cited 1998)
- Language family: Austronesian: Malayo-Polynesian; Oceanic; Western; Meso-Melanesian; Northwest Solomonic; Nehan–Bougainville; Saposa–Tinputz; Saposa

Language codes
- ISO 639-3: sps
- Glottolog: sapo1253

Saposa is an Austronesian language spoken on Bougainville, Papua New Guinea.
