= Hahon language =

Oceanic language spoken in Papua New Guinea

Hahon
- Native to: Papua New Guinea
- Region: Bougainville
- Native speakers: 3,000 (2014)
- Language family: Austronesian: Malayo-Polynesian; Oceanic; Western; Meso-Melanesian; Northwest Solomonic; Nehan–Bougainville; Saposa–Tinputz; Hahon

Language codes
- ISO 639-3: hah
- Glottolog: haho1237
- ELP: Hahon

Hahon is an Austronesian language of Bougainville, Papua New Guinea.
