= Bannoni language =

Oceanic language spoken in Papua New Guinea

Bannoni
- Banoni
- Tsunari
- Native to: Papua New Guinea
- Region: Bougainville Province
- Native speakers: (4,500 cited 2000)
- Language family: Austronesian: Malayo-Polynesian; Oceanic; Western; Meso-Melanesian; Northwest Solomonic; Piva–Banoni; Bannoni

Language codes
- ISO 639-3: bcm
- Glottolog: bann1247

Bannoni, also known as Tsunari, is an Austronesian language of Papua New Guinea. It has approximately 1,000 native speakers. The Banoni people refer to their language as Tsunari, but acknowledge the name Banoni and accept it as well. Tsunari technically translates to 'their truth'.

== Location ==
The exact location of the Banoni people and the region where their language is spoken is Banoni Census Division, Buin Sub-District, Bouganville Province, Papua New Guinea. The Bouganville Province is technically an island in between Papua New Guinea and the Solomon Islands. Geographically speaking, the region of the island where Banoni is spoken is near and on the coast of Empress Augusta Bay in the southwest Bouganville province. Villages are separated from the coast by swamps at the bottom of Motopena Point. The villages in which Banoni is spoken are Mabes, Mariga, Kongara, Dzarara. There is a speech variety which is different but mutually intelligible with that of other villages by the names of Mokui, Mokovi, Mavaraka, Iaba, Koiare and Kegiri. The villages of the Bouganville province are divided up into regional groups, the North group, the East group, and the West group. The West group is the group of the Banoni along with the Piva. The Banoni and the Piva are very similar. It has been observed that the Banoni and the Piva interact with each other, though the frequency of contact between Banoni speakers and their non-Austronesian neighbors has yet to be determined. One of the non-Austronesian speaking neighbors to the Banoni is that of the language Choiseul, which is just a few miles to the southeast of Bouganville and it shows no resemblances to any languages spoken on Bouganville. It has been observed that none of the Oceanic languages from Buka to the Shortlands relate closely to any other language found off the island of Bouganville. The speech or language of Mabes, a small village on the Bouganville island, is the origin of where the study where all of the most current information recorded on Banoni took place.

== Previous studies ==
Banoni speakers were completed by German ethnographers and travelers. The earliest recordings or mentions of the Banoni language and its people dates back only a century and a half ago. Freiherr von Schleinitz sailed into a bay, which he named Kaiserin Agusta Bai, now referred to as Augusta Bay. It is known that then it was under Banoni control, like it is now. As recorded, the ethnographer of the expedition did not see any villages but did see twenty-one men in a plank canoe. Some of the most important works are those of Friederici, who recorded works on the Banoni in the years 1912 and 1913. However, the first World War in Europe put an end to early studies and research on Bouganville. Friederici mentioned that a few of the men knew some words in English, suggesting previous contact with English speakers whether it be via whaling, traders or blackbirders. Other significant mentions of the Banoni people came later through writings of Ray in 1926, Oliver in 1949, Allen and Hurd in 1965 and Capell in 1971. Oliver recorded that after the Germans left their research to attend the war in Europe, the Australians promptly took over the small German garrison, but did not pay much attention to the estimated 45,000 Bouganvilleans. Capell used data to support his claims, unlike many previous researchers, and he was able to record a larger body of work than others.

== Phonology ==
The Banoni language has a simple syllable structure. Like numerous other Oceanic languages, it distinguishes five vowel qualities. When two like vowels follow each other they are combined to an elongated sound that usually has a drop in pitch, though this change in the tone does not altern the meaning.

Unlike related languages from the Solomon Islands, Banoni's voiced stops are entirely oral, not prenasalized like in Fijian.

Voiced bilabial stop:

biini [bi:ini] 'beach'

Voiced alveolar stop:

dapisa [dapisa] 'three'

Unlike in English, the voiced dentals /d/ and /t/ are not just different by vocal usage, but also by point of articulation: the /d/ is produced further back than the /t/. According to Banoni speakers, this causes the sound to be 'clearer'.

=== Orthography ===
The five contrastive vowels in Banoni are the following:

Vowel symbols
i	e	a	o	u

The main points of articulation in the consonant system of the Banoni language are labial, dental or alveolar, palatal, and velar. These combine with the five vowels to form the following simple syllables:

Consonant symbols
-	-i	-e	-a	-o	-u
p	pi	pe	pa	po	pu
t	ti	te	ta	to	–
ts	tfi	tfe	–	–	tfu
k	ki	ke	ka	ko	ku
b	bi	be	ba	bo	bu
d	di	de	da	do	–
dz	dvi	dve	–	–	dvu
g	gi	ge	ga	go	gu
m	mi	me	ma	mo	mu
n	ni	ne	na	no	nu
l	li	le	la	lo	lu
z	zi	ze	za	zo	zu
r	ri	re	ra	ro	ru
s	si	se	sa	so	su
(h)	--	(he)	(ha)	(ho)	--

== Morphology ==
As Banoni is an Austronesian language, its morphemes are similar to those in the languages of Malaysia, Madagascar, Philippines and Polynesia.

The Banoni language is a part of the Oceanic subgroup of Austronesian languages because of its similarities to Polynesian, Micronesian and Melanesian languages.

Vowel lengthening is present in the Banoni language and changes the meaning of certain words, for example vom 'turtle' vs. voom 'new'.

== Syntax ==
Banoni has a combination of SVO (subject–verb–object) and VSO (verb–subject–object) word orders.

Generally the subject comes before the verb, and the object follows the verb almost always. However, the subject can sometimes follow the verb. The majority of such cases are in dependent clauses, with only a few in a few independent clauses.

=== Noun structure ===
Markers of person, number and case
	I	II	III	IP	I+II	IIP	IIIP
Independent	na	no	nna	ghaman	ghata	gham	nari
Object	-aa	-igho	-a	-mam	-ita	-mi	-ria
Poss I	(-ghe)	-m	-na	-mam	-ra	-mi	-ri
Poss 2	ghe	ghe-m	ghe-na	ghe-mam	ghe-ra	ghe-mi	ghe-ri
Poss 3	min-na	min-no	man-na	me-ghamam	me-ghata	man-ghami	man-nari

Markers of person number and case; glosses
I	thou	he/she/it	we	you+i	you	they
me	thee	him/her/it	us	you+me	you	them
my	thy	his/her/its	our	your+my	your	their

Diagram of sentence structure
(TP)	(SP)	VP	(OP)	(IOP)	(Oblique)

"(TP) = Temporal Phrase

SP = Subject Phrase (may precede or follow VOP immediately)

OP = Object Phrase [may precede VP under as yet unspecifiable conditions]

IOP = Indirect Object Phrase

Oblique = Locative, temporal, instrumental, and probably other types of phrases occur in sentence – finally. Ordering among these is unknown. Sentences having more than two phrases outside the verb phrase are quite unusual."

Diagram of verb phrase structure
Preverb	Prefix	Verb	Postverb	Suffix	Complement
ke~ka~ko | ta | ne ma | to | no	va- vai- ta (reduplication)	[+stative] [+active] podo tani	geroo katsu va-rubasa	[object pronoun] -i (?)	([pronoun]) mo [verb]) [locative] [instrument] ma nau vai [comitative] [temporal]
tsi ghinava maa paghe-					

== Sources ==
- Lincoln, Peter (1976). Describing Banoni, an Austronesian Language of Southwest Bougainville.
