= Tinputz language =

Austronesian language spoken in Papua New Guinea

Tinputz
- Vasuii
- Native to: Papua New Guinea
- Region: Bougainville
- Native speakers: (3,900 cited 1991)
- Language family: Austronesian: Malayo-Polynesian; Oceanic; Western; Meso-Melanesian; Northwest Solomonic; Nehan–Bougainville; Saposa–Tinputz; Tinputz

Language codes
- ISO 639-3: tpz
- Glottolog: tinp1237

Tinputz is an Austronesian language spoken in Tinputz Rural LLG of Bougainville, Papua New Guinea.
