= Petats language =

Austronesian language of Papua New Guinea

Petats
- Native to: Papua New Guinea
- Region: Buka Island
- Native speakers: (2,000 cited 1975); 8,000 L2 speakers (1977)
- Language family: Austronesian: Malayo-Polynesian; Oceanic; Western; Meso-Melanesian; Northwest Solomonic; Nehan–Bougainville; Buka; Petats

Language codes
- ISO 639-3: pex
- Glottolog: peta1245

Petats is an Austronesian language spoken by a few thousand persons in Papua New Guinea. Dialects are Hitau-Pororan, Matsungan, and Sumoun.

== Grammar ==
Verbal inflection is accomplished through post verbal pronominal particles which carry tense and mood marking.

== Resources ==
- Global Recordings Network Petats
- Jerry Allen and Matthew Beaso. 1975. Petats Phonemes and Orthography
- Petats Organised Phonology Data
- Materials on Petats are included in the open access Arthur Capell collections (AC1 and AC2) and the Malcolm Ross collection (MR1) held by Paradisec.
