= Joseph Watawi =

Papua New Guinean politician

1st Vice-President of the Autonomous Region of Bougainville
- In office 15 June 2005 – 15 May 2007
- President: Joseph Kabui
- Preceded by: Office established
- Succeeded by: John Tabinaman

Member of the Bougainville House of Representatives
- In office 2005–2020
- Constituency: Selau

Personal details
- Born: 27 January 1960 Gohi, Territory of Papua and New Guinea
- Died: 15 November 2021 (aged 61) Buka, Papua New Guinea
- Spouse: Belinda Watawi

Joseph Watawi (27 January 1960 – 15 November 2021) was the first Vice-President of the Autonomous Region of Bougainville, an autonomous island of Papua New Guinea. After playing an important role in the island's conflict and peace process, Watawi was elected to office and served under the region's first President Joseph Kabui from 2005 to 2007.

== Early life and Bougainville Conflict ==
Watawi was born in Gohi village in the Selau area of northern Bougainville on 27 January 1960, in what was then the Australian-administered Territory of Papua and New Guinea, to Anna Tsehu (a chief and landowner in matrilineal Selau society) and Paul Mini (a chief of the Nabuin clan). Watawi attended Hutjena High School on Bougainville, and gained an engineering qualification at Malaguna Technical College in Rabaul and Lae Technical College.

Beginning in 1979, Watawi took a job at the Panguna mine where he became a union shop steward advocating for the rights of workers and landowners. Negotiations with the mine operator Bougainville Copper (a subsidiary of Australian company Rio Tinto) began to break down and Watawi was instrumental in halting work at the mine. This precipitated the Bougainville conflict between the Bougainville Revolutionary Army (BRA) and the Papua New Guinea Defence Force (PNGDF) from 1988 to 1998, which permanently closed the mine and devastated Bougainville. Watawi, paramount chief of Selau, negotiated with both sides on behalf of his people and was instrumental in the peace process.

== Political career ==
=== 1990s–2005: Interim government ===
As the Bougainville conflict drew to a close in the late 1990s, Watawi joined the Bougainville Transitional Government under Gerard Sinato, which eventually united with the BRA to form the Bougainville People's Congress. Watawi was a lead negotiator for the Congress in reaching the Bougainville Peace Agreement. The agreement paved the way for the Bougainville Interim Authority, which Watawi became the first chairman of in 2000.

=== 2005–2010: First term, vice presidency ===
In the 2005 Bougainvillean general election, Watawi was elected to represent the constituency of Selau. Watawi was chosen by newly elected President Joseph Kabui to serve as Vice-President of the Autonomous Region of Bougainville, becoming the first person to hold the office in the newly inaugurated Autonomous Bougainville Government. Watawi was sworn in alongside Kabui and Magdalene Toroansi at a special ceremony in Arawa on 10 June.

In 2007, Watawi was stripped of the Vice-Presidency following the Amun scandal. Peter Tsiamalili, chief administrator of Bougainville, died unexpectedly in his sleep in Torokina in the Amun area. Watawi attended Tsiamalili's funeral alongside several high-ranking government officials. Several officials including Watawi and acting chief administrator Patrick Koles arrived at the village intoxicated, causing a significant backlash. The group were reportedly drinking beer during the mourning in violation of cultural taboo, and were immediately asked to leave the village. Media reported Watawi and the officials were chased out of the village by angry locals, and had the keys to their vehicle confiscated. Torokina district chiefs, the Tsiamalili family, and other officials condemned Watawi's behaviour as disgraceful and demanded he be removed from office. On 4 May 2007, five thousand people held a protest in Buka calling for Watawi's ouster. Petitions were given to Joseph Kabui by a women's NGO and former combatants of the Bougainville conflict calling for Watawi's immediate removal from office.

Under pressure, President Kabui dismissed Watawi from his position as vice-president in May 2007, citing Section 96 (2) of the Bougainville Constitution. Kabui stated that Watawi's actions had breached Section 6 of the leadership code in the Constitution dealing with loyalty to Bougainville. John Tabinaman was chosen as the new vice-president.

Kabui described the decision to demote Watawi as "painful" and said he had "the greatest respect" for Watawi's work. Watawi remained in Cabinet, and was appointed to the newly created ministerial portfolio of Public Service, Trade and Industry and Micro Finance. Media reported that some in Bougainville were unhappy that Watawi was not removed from Cabinet over the incident. Kabui died in office on 7 June 2008 and was succeeded by James Tanis following the 2008 Bougainvillean presidential election. Watawi served as Minister for Trade under Tanis, and built the first ever copra mill on the island.

In the 2010 Bougainvillean general election Watawi lost his Selau seat to independent candidate Terry Bose.

=== 2015–2020: Second term, referendum ===
In the 2015 Bougainvillean general election Watawi was re-elected to represent the Selau constituency. Watawi was appointed head of the Parliamentary Committee on Referendum, Peace, Security and Unification in the lead up to the 2019 Bougainvillean independence referendum. In 2015, Watawi announced there would be reconciliation between the BRA and PNGDF, which was supported by former BRA leader Sam Kauona and PNGDF Brigadier General Gilbert Toropo. Watawi led a reconciliation process in accordance with local custom.

Watawi coined the slogan for the independence campaign, Bruk lus, bruk gut, bruk steret na bruk olgeta (Tok Pisin, transl. Break loose, break clean, break now, and break up altogether). In 2018, Watawi released a statement criticising Australia for interfering in Bougainville's affairs in the lead up to the referendum, arguing Australia had fuelled the Bougainville conflict and only sought to attain power and influence within Bougainville. Watawi also praised New Zealand's support as a "trusted and respected international partner" and quipped that "Australia would have more power and influence [in Bougainville] if they replaced their foreign and aid corps with a drunken rugby team." In 2018 Watawi also held a practice referendum in Selau with an overwhelming vote in favour of independence.

In the 2019 referendum, 98% of voters supported independence from Papua New Guinea, a major victory for the independence movement Watawi had been a key figure of for decades. Following the referendum result Watawi, who was Minister for Economic Development and Economic Services Minister, called on Bougainvilleans to prepare the island for independence by growing its economy.

=== 2020–2021: Advisory role and death ===
In the 2020 Bougainvillean general election Watawi lost the Selau seat to Paul Otto Cheung, a medical doctor. Despite having lost his seat in parliament, Watawi was invited by Ezekiel Massat to be a political advisor on the Bougainville Independence Mission Advisory Team and an Eminent Person in Independence Consultations.

Joseph Watawi died in Buka Hospital on 15 November 2021, during the COVID-19 pandemic. Watawi was eulogised in the Sydney Morning Herald and incumbent Bougainvillean President Ishmael Toroama released an official statement of condolence.

Political offices
New office	Vice-President of the Autonomous Region of Bougainville; 2005–2007	Succeeded by John Tabinaman
