= History of Bougainville =

Bougainville, region in Papua New Guinea

Bougainville, an autonomous region of Papua New Guinea (PNG), has been inhabited by humans for at least 29,000 years, according to artefacts found in Kilu Cave on Buka Island. The region is named after Bougainville Island, the largest island of the Solomon Islands archipelago, but also contains a number of smaller islands.

The first arrivals in Bougainville were ethnically Australo-Melanesian, related to Papuans and Aboriginal Australians. Around 3,000 years ago, Austronesians associated with the Lapita culture also settled on the islands, bringing agriculture and pottery. Present-day Bougainvilleans are descended from a mixture of the two populations, and both Austronesian and non-Austronesian languages are spoken to this day.

In 1616, Dutch explorers Willem Schouten and Jacob Le Maire became the first Europeans to sight the islands. The main island was named after French admiral Louis Antoine de Bougainville, who reached it in 1768. The German Empire placed Bougainville under a protectorate in 1886, while the remainder of the Solomon Islands became part of the British Empire in 1893. The present-day boundaries between Papua New Guinea and Solomon Islands were established by the Tripartite Convention of 1899. The incorporation of Bougainville into German New Guinea initially had little economic impact, although the associated Catholic missions succeeded in converting a majority of the islanders to Christianity.

The Australian Naval and Military Expeditionary Force (AN&MEF) occupied German New Guinea in 1914, following the outbreak of World War I. After the war's end, Bougainville and the other occupied territories were named as a League of Nations mandate, which Australia administered as the Territory of New Guinea. During World War II, the Japanese invaded and occupied Bougainville in order to support their operations elsewhere in the Pacific. The subsequent Allied campaign to reclaim the islands resulted in heavy casualties and the eventual restoration of Australian control in 1945.

In 1949, following administrative reforms by the Australian government, Bougainville was incorporated into the Territory of Papua and New Guinea. The Panguna mine was established in 1969 and soon become a source of conflict. The Bougainville independence movement established the Republic of the North Solomons in 1975, but by the following year the newly independent PNG government had re-established control. Tensions continued, and the subsequent Bougainville Civil War (1988–1998) resulted in the deaths of thousands of people, as the Bougainville Revolutionary Army sought to secure independence and was resisted by the Papua New Guinea Defence Force. A peace agreement was reached in 2001, by which it was agreed that an autonomous region would be established and an independence referendum would be held; the latter was held in 2019. In March 2025, the Bougainville Leaders Consultation Forum recommended September 1, 2027, as the date for Bougainville to declare independence from Papua New Guinea. It was announced since July 2026 that it will take effect on 1 September 2030.

== Prehistory ==
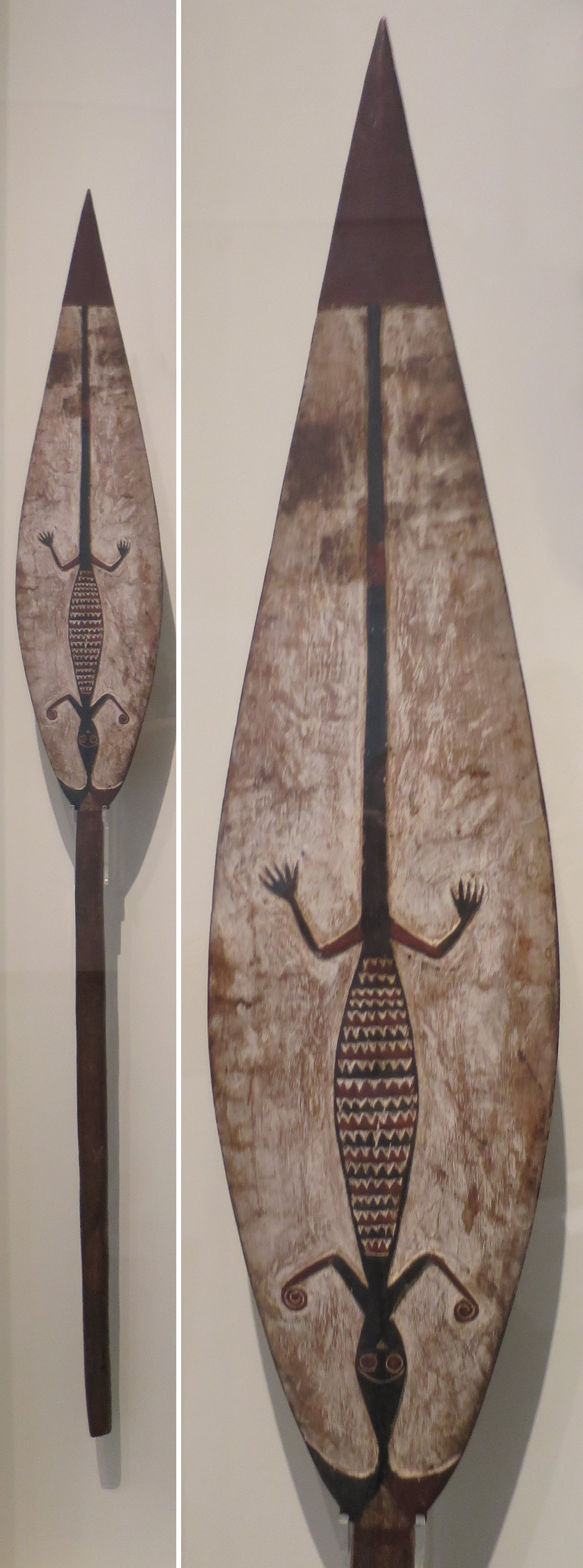
Traditional canoe paddle from Buka Island

The earliest known site of human occupation in Bougainville is Kilu Cave, located on Buka Island. The bottom-most archaeological deposits in the cave were radiocarbon-dated to between 28,700 and 20,100 years ago. During the Last Glacial Maximum, until approximately 10,000 years ago, present-day Bougainville Island was part of a single landmass known as "Greater Bougainville", which spanned from the northern tip of Buka Island to the Nggela Islands north of Guadalcanal. The "obvious immediate origin for its first colonists" of Bougainville is the Bismarck Archipelago to the north, where sites have been identified dating back 35,000 to 40,000 years.

The first settlers of Bougainville were Melanesians, likely related to present-day Papuans and Aboriginal Australians. Approximately 3,000 years ago, a wave of Austronesian peoples arrived in Bougainville, bringing with them the Lapita culture. The Austronesians brought with them a fully agricultural lifestyle, also introducing distinctive pottery and domesticated pigs, dogs and chickens to Bougainville. The advent of the Lapita culture resulted in "a pattern of apparent extinctions of birds and endemic mammals". Both Austronesian and non-Austronesian languages (historically called "East Papuan") continue to be spoken on Bougainville today. There has been substantial genetic and cultural mixing between the Austronesian and non-Austronesian populations, "such that language is no longer correlated with either genetics or culture in any direct or simplistic way".

Douglas Oliver in his 1991 book discussed one of the unique aspects of the people of Bougainville:

[A] trait shared by the present-day descendants of both northerners and southerners is their skin-colour, which is very black. Indeed, it is darker than that of any population of present-day Pacific islanders, including the present-day indigenes of New Ireland, the larger homeland of the first Bougainvilleans. The presence of Bougainville as a 'black spot' in an island world of brownskins (later called redskins) raises a question that cannot now be answered. Were the genes producing that darker pigmentation carried by the first Bougainvilleans when they arrived? Or did they evolve by natural or 'social' selection, during the millennia in which the descendants of those pioneers remained isolated, reproductively, from neighbouring islanders? Nothing now known about Bougainville's physical environment can support an argument for the natural selection of its peoples' distinctively black pigmentation; therefore a case might be made for social selection, namely an aesthetic (and hence reproductive) preference for black skin.

== Early European contact ==
Dutch explorers Willem Schouten and Jacob Le Maire were the first Europeans to sight present-day Bougainville, skirting Takuu Atoll and Nissan Island in 1616. In 1643, another Dutch expedition led by Abel Tasman was the first to make contact with the islanders and describe their appearance. There was no further European contact until 1767, when British naval officer Philip Carteret visited and named the Carteret Islands. Carteret was also the first European to see Buka Island. The following year, Frenchman Louis Antoine de Bougainville sailed along the east coast of Bougainville Island, which bears his name. He also gave Buka Island its name, after a word that was repeatedly called out to him from canoes originating from the island.

== German protectorate ==
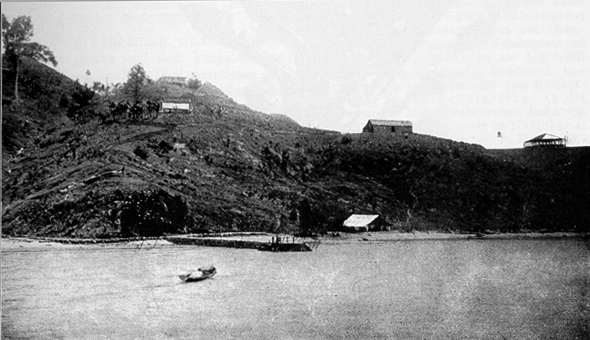
German station at Kieta, 1909

On 10 April 1886, two years after the establishment of German New Guinea, the United Kingdom and Germany agreed to divide the Solomon Islands archipelago into spheres of influence. As a result of this agreement, the islands of Buka, Bougainville, Choiseul, Santa Isabel, Ontong Java, the Shortland Islands, and part of the Florida Islands were placed under a German protectorate (Schutzgebiet), which was formally established on 28 October 1886 by the commander of SMS Adler. On 13 December, Kaiser Wilhelm I granted the New Guinea Company a charter to govern the protectorate in accordance with the existing arrangements for German New Guinea. The remainder of the archipelago became the British Solomon Islands Protectorate, which was not formally established until 1893. The present-day boundary between Bougainville and the country of Solomon Islands was established following the Tripartite Convention of 1899, which saw some of the northern islands ceded to the UK in exchange for German control over Western Samoa. The Shortlands, Choiseul, Santa Isabel, and Ontong Java were included in the cession.

The Northern Solomons were initially grouped with the Bismarck Archipelago for German administrative purposes. The first official visit from the German administration did not occur until November 1888. The acting administrator Reinhold Kraetke arrived accompanied by an imperial judge, a company manager, a visiting German journalist, a missionary, and a local merchant Richard Parkinson who had been recruiting labourers from the area for several years. A native police force was quickly established. The first punitive expedition undertaken by the German administration occurred in April 1899, in response to the killing of two European seamen in Tinputz Bay the previous year. The SMS Möwe landed 20 members of the native police force armed with bows and arrows, who killed seven people, burned a village, and took its valuables. It was not until 1905 that a government station was opened in Bougainville. The station, situated in Kieta, was placed directly under the Governor of German New Guinea.

The German protectorate over the islands initially had little economic impact. A handful of copra plantations were established, but proved unproductive, and the area was seen primarily as a source of labour for existing plantations in other parts of New Guinea. As of 1905, "there was apparently not a single permanent trading post manned by a non-native". The first fully commercial plantation was established at Aropa in 1908 by the Bismarck Archipelago Company. In 1910, the New Britain Corporation established a plantation at Toiemonapu. There was subsequently a rush of commercial activity, with ten enterprises established in 1911. By April 1913, land acquisitions of over 10,000 hectares (25,000 acres) had been approved by the administration, mostly by Australian companies. About 220 kilometres (140 mi) of roads had been built by this time, and construction on a hospital for natives had begun. The total tax revenue for 1913 was almost 28,000 marks, about half of which was collected in Kieta. As of 1 January 1914, there were 74 Europeans in the area, one-third of whom were connected with the Marist mission and 17 of whom were British subjects (including Australians). There were also 20 "foreign natives", mostly Chinese and Malay.

== World War I and Australian administration ==
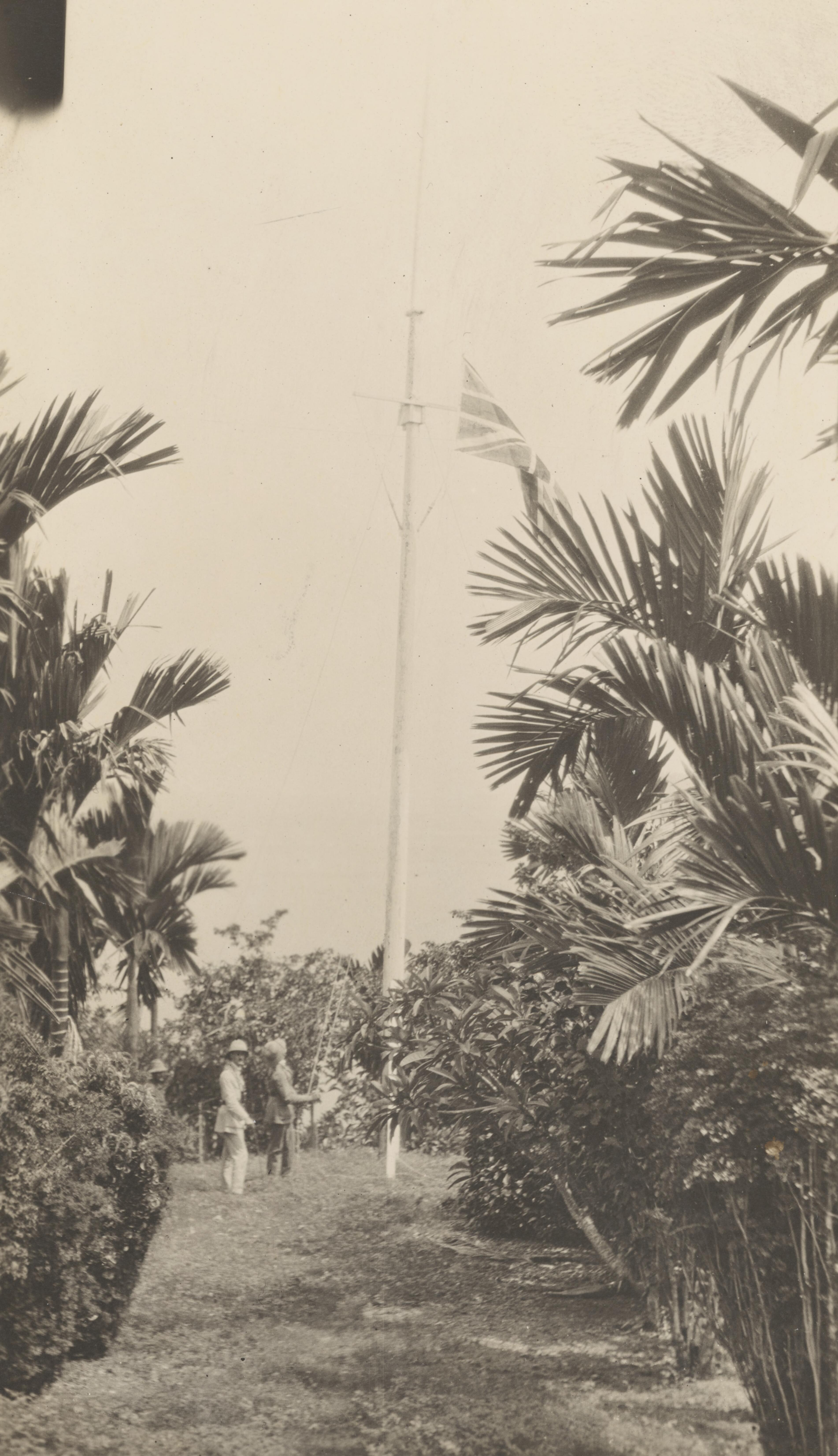
Members of the Australian Naval and Military Expeditionary Force hoisting the Union Jack at Kieta in 1914

Following the outbreak of World War I, the Australian Naval and Military Expeditionary Force (AN&MEF) occupied Bougainville in December 1914, as part of the broader Australian occupation of German New Guinea. The 1919 Treaty of Versailles established the former German territory as a League of Nations mandate, the responsibility for which was awarded to Australia. The Australian military administration had adopted a "business as usual" approach and secured the support of the existing German business community. It was replaced by a civil administration in 1920, which expropriated the property of German nationals without compensation and deported them.

The Australian administration continued the German approach of "pacification", intervening in local conflicts. This allowed labour recruiters to enter new regions and secure more workers for the plantations. In 1915, more than 60 native police officers were deployed to Soraken to protect against raids from mountain tribes, who were known to engage in cannibalism. An expedition was launched against Bowu, an "influential cannibal chief". His village at Kaumumu was attacked and Bowu's severed head was displayed to the local people. However, "it is doubtful if the display of severed heads had the intended effect since these acts had taken place outside the customary ceremonial context".

In 1921, the population of Bougainville was recorded at 46,832. The Australian district officer was based at Kieta and controlled a native police force of 40 constables and five officers. The civil administration "pursued pacification less ferociously than its military predecessor" and recruited Bougainvilleans as interpreters. The administration established larger "line villages" in place of the smaller hamlets, in order to simplify collection and "condition the able-bodied men to the barracks discipline on the plantations". German ethnographer Richard Thurnwald returned to Buin in 1933 following an earlier visit in 1908. He noted a number of changes over the 25-year period, including a large increase in literacy, the introduction of a cash economy (comprising both coins and shell money), the erosion of chiefly authority, a decrease in headhunting, and the introduction of feast-giving as a surrogate for war.

The Australians had adopted many aspects of the previous German Administration. There was little difference between the two colonisers except for the expropriation policy and the line village consolidation program. The Germans had done the pioneering work in the colony and the Australians made this the foundation for colonial management.

The 1920s saw the introduction of Protestantism to Bougainville, in the form of missionaries from the Methodist Church of New Zealand (1921) and the Seventh-day Adventist Church (1924). Tensions arose between the existing Catholic missionaries and the new arrivals, culminating in sectarian disturbances in Kieta in 1929. Father Albert Binois wrote to his superiors that the Protestants were "friends of the devil". The late 1920s and 1930s also produced an influx of anthropologists and ethnographers to Bougainville, among them Australians Ernest and Sarah Chinnery, Catholic priest Patrick O'Reilly, Briton Beatrice Blackwood, and American Douglas L. Oliver.

== Second World War ==
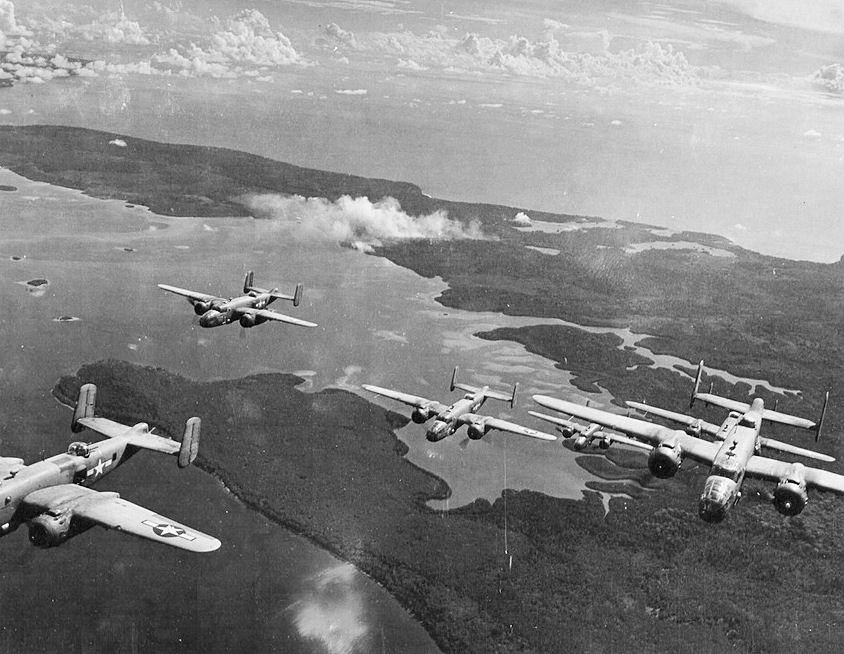
B-25 Mitchell bombers from the USAAF 42nd Bombardment Group over Bougainville, 1944

In 1942, Bougainville was occupied by Japanese forces, who used it as a base to attack Guadalcanal and other Allied territory. In November 1943, the 3rd Marine Division landed on the west coast of Bougainville. Shortly afterwards the Battle of Empress Augusta Bay was fought between cruisers and destroyers of the U.S. Navy and the Imperial Japanese Navy. The Americans routed the Japanese and took control of the seas in this area. A concerted Allied land offensive between November 1943 and April 1944 was needed to occupy and hold the part of the island along the western shore in an area called "Torokina". The Americans set about establishing a wide defensive perimeter, draining swamps, and building multiple airfields for defence. Their next goal was to attack the Japanese on New Britain Island. The Marines were replaced by US Army troops.

The Japanese infiltrated the mountains and jungles of Bougainville, and launched a counteroffensive against the Americans in 1944. The critical focus of their attack was at a place called "Hellsapoppin Ridge" by the Americans. In repulsing this attack, the American soldiers and airmen broke the back of the Japanese Army on Bougainville. The survivors retreated to their bases on northern and southern Bougainville, and the Americans left them to "wither on the vine" for the remainder of the war. During the 1943–45 period, more than 17,500 Japanese soldiers were either killed in combat, died of disease, or died of malnutrition.

In April 1943 Admiral Isoroku Yamamoto, commander of the Combined Fleet of the Imperial Japanese Navy, was killed on Bougainville Island when his transport aircraft was shot down by American fighter aircraft during Operation Vengeance.

In 1945, the Australian Army took over occupation from the Americans. Australia resumed control of Bougainville and Papua New Guinea, which became a United Nations trusteeship. The remaining Japanese on Bougainville refused to surrender, but held out until the surrender of the Empire of Japan on 2 September 1945. They were commanded by the Emperor to surrender to the Allied Australians, Americans, and New Zealanders, and they were repatriated to Japan.

== Beginnings of the independence movement ==
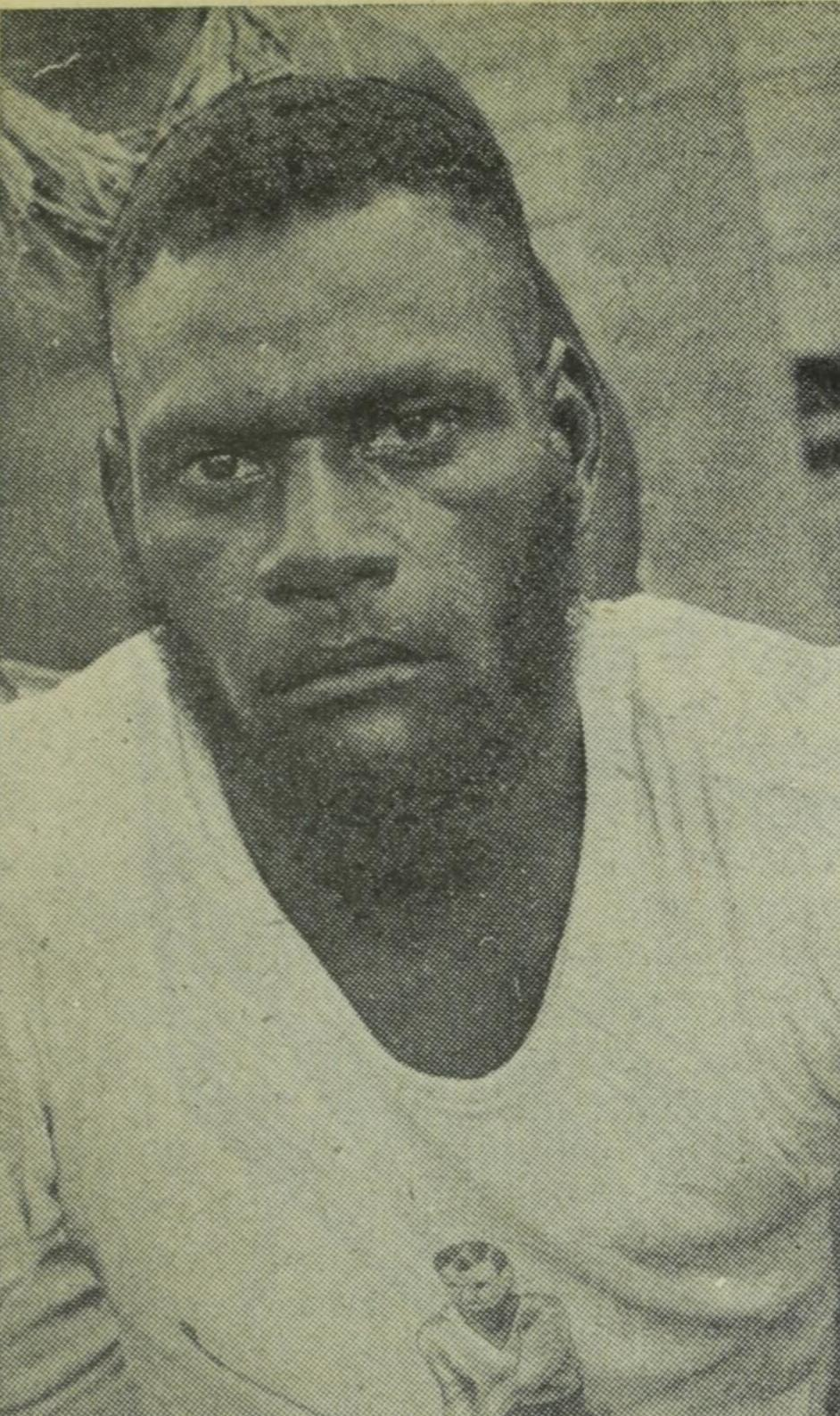
Francis Hagai, leader of the anti-colonial Hahalis Welfare Society

Bougainville is rich in copper, and possibly gold. The mining of copper has been the subject of considerable social tensions over the last fifty years. Local people made two attempts at secession in protest of the mining exploitation.

The Hahalis Welfare Society, established in 1959 and led by John Teosin and Francis Hagai, mounted a campaign against Australian authorities' attempts to impose a head tax. In 1962 over 60 people were injured in a series of conflicts with territorial police. By 1963 the society claimed 3,500 members spread over eight villages.

In 1964, Australian business began the first attempt to explore the island's resources: CRA Exploration, a subsidiary of Australian company Rio Tinto Zinc, began drilling in the Panguna area. The Panguna mine opened in 1969 under its subsidiary, Bougainville Copper.

The first independence movement emerged in the late 1960s, at a time when other colonial governments were being dismantled in Asian and African nations. The local indigenous people began to air their grievances against the Australian colonial government over the handling of the Panguna mine and protested the inadequate sharing of revenues being generated from mining on their land. Australian External Territories Minister Charles Barnes was accused of telling the Bougainvillean people they would "get nothing". The local people sued for compensation and the case went to the High Court of Australia. It found that the compensation was inadequate under ordinary federal Australian law. But, as an external territory, Papua New Guinea was not guaranteed the same standards that applied to mainland Australia.

In 1972, Australia granted Bougainville some degree of autonomy, but this did not end the secessionist movement. Relations between Bougainville and the government of Papua New Guinea deteriorated after the murders of two senior Bougainvillean public servants in December 1972. This was rumored to be retaliation for a road accident in the highlands of Papua New Guinea. Islanders were outraged by the murders, and the events helped to consolidate the independence movement. As a result, the Bougainville Special Political Committee (BSPC) was set up to negotiate with the Papuan government on the future of Bougainville within PNG.

By 1974, the BSPC had reached a compromise with a Special Committee of the Papuan Parliament, which would have given the island greater autonomy. The Special Committee did not agree to providing a defined share of the profits from the Panguna mine to the people of Bougainville. The conservative Papuan government declined to follow key sections of the committee's report, and in May 1975, negotiations between the two parties collapsed completely.

=== Republic of North Solomons ===
On 28 May 1975, the Interim Provincial Government in Bougainville agreed to secede from Papua New Guinea. This caused a three-way impasse between the Government of PNG, the legislature in PNG, and the authorities in Bougainville. The PNG government attempted to resolve the situation through June and July, but failed. The Interim Provincial Government announced that they would declare independence on 1 September, ahead of Papua New Guinea's own planned independence day of 16 September. On 1 September, they issued the 'Unilateral Declaration of Independence of the Republic of North Solomons'.

They sought international recognition through the United Nations, but were unsuccessful. They also failed in an attempt to unite with the Solomon Islands. In early 1976, the Bougainvillean government realised that they would have to accept Papua New Guinean sovereignty.

Later that year, both the governments signed the 'Bougainville Agreement', which gave the island autonomy within Papua New Guinea. The PNG government promised full independence in five years, but did not fulfill this promise. For the remainder of the 1970s, and into the early 1980s, relations between the two remained tense, but relatively peaceful. In 1981 disputes re-emerged over the status of the mine, which was the basis of the conflict that became violent in 1988.

== Secessionist conflict ==
=== Tensions ===
Operations of the mine at Panguna and sharing of its revenues had been perhaps the major sticking point between Bougainville and PNG government. The mine was the largest non-aid revenue stream of the Government of Papua New Guinea from 1975, when it became independent, to the mine's closure in 1989. The national government received a 20% share of profit from the mine and authorised 0.5–1.25% share to the Bougainvilleans.

Revenues from the mine products was vitally important to the economy of Papua New Guinea, but the people of Bougainville were seeing little benefit from it. In addition, they began to recognise that they were bearing the total effects of the mine's environmental consequences for the island. They claimed that the Jaba River had been poisoned, causing birth defects among local people, as well as the extinction of the flying fox on the island and adverse effects on fish and other species. Critics said that Bougainville Copper had created an apartheid, segregated system, with one set of facilities for white workers, and one set for the locals.

=== Insurgency ===
By late 1988, cousins and local leaders, Francis Ona and Pepetua Serero, decided to take up arms against the Papuan government. Ona had worked for Bougainville Copper, and had witnessed the effects the mine was having on the environment.

In 1987, Ona and Serero had called a meeting of landowners around Panguna, forming the Panguna Landowners' Association. Serero was selected as 'Chairlady' and Ona as General Secretary. They demanded billions in compensation from CRA for lost revenues and damages, a total of half the mine's profits since it began in 1969.

A report on the SBS Dateline program, broadcast on 26 June 2011, states that Sir Michael Somare, at the time Papua New Guinea's Opposition Leader, had signed an affidavit in 2001 specifying that the PNG government was acting under instruction from mining giant Rio Tinto. SBS reported on 27 June 2011 that Bougainville Copper Limited and Rio Tinto denied this assertion, and rejected ideas that they had started the war.

=== Uprising ===
In November 1988 Bougainville Revolutionary Army (BRA) returned to attack the mine, holding up its magazine, stealing explosives, and committing numerous acts of arson and sabotage. They cut the power supply to the entire mine by blowing up power pylons. These BRA forces were commanded by Sam Kauona, a man who had trained in Australia and defected from the Papuan defence forces to become Ona's right-hand man. Kauona became the spokesperson for the BRA. He continued to conduct hit-and-run raids on mine property and PNG government installations. Following targeted attacks on mine employees, the company closed the mine on 15 May 1989. Serero died from asthma soon afterward and Ona led the uprising with help from Kauona. Evacuation of all remaining employees of Bougainville Copper Limited followed after the mine's closure, with all personnel withdrawn by 24 March 1990.

The Papuan police, and the army under Jerry Singirok made several arrests, but Ona proved to be elusive. They failed to catch him. (Singirok was later an important player in the Sandline affair.) Attempts to resolve the standoff continued, and Bougainville Copper continued to deny responsibility for the grievances brought by Ona and his supporters. The company suggested that the flying foxes had suffered high fatalities due to a virus brought in from East New Britain, and said that mine operations had not affected the health of the river. The PNG government and Bougainville Copper initially made attempts to resolve some of the outstanding issues, and offered an expensive compromise deal, which was rejected outright by Ona and Kauona.

The Premier of Bougainville, Joseph Kabui, and Father John Momis, the Member for Bougainville in the national parliament and a former leader of the 1975 secession effort, supported Ona and Kauona. They demanded that the company recognise them as legitimate leaders. Both of these men later became involved directly in the independence movement. They were beaten by riot police during a 1989 protest. Allegations of human rights abuses by the PNG army began to arise. These embarrassed the PNG government, which arrested more than 20 men in the army after an investigation.

The BRA conducted violence against the provincial government, including the assassination of John Bika, Kabui's Commerce and Liquor Licensing Minister. He had supported the compromise agreement between the Bougainvilleans and the Government.

As a response to the continuing violence, the national government called a state of emergency; it placed the island under the administration of the Police Commissioner, who was based in Port Moresby. The allegations of human rights abuses continued, and a survey in late 1989 indicated that at least 1600 homes had been destroyed. The conflict showed no signs of ending, and in January 1990, Bougainville Copper announced the mothballing of the Panguna mine.

In 1990, Prime Minister Rabbie Namaliu of Papua New Guinea agreed to pull Papuan troops out, and for international observers to witness the disarmament of the BRA. The agreement was signed by Sam Kauona for the BRA. The police feared attacks by the locals and fled; leaving the island to the control of the BRA. In Port Moresby, there was an attempted military coup against the government following the decision to withdraw; it was defeated.

=== Civil war ===
In May 1990, Papua New Guinea imposed a blockade on Bougainville. Francis Ona responded by unilaterally declaring independence. He set up the Bougainville Interim Government (BIG), but it had little power, and the island began to descend into disarray. The command structure set up by the BRA seldom had any real control over the various groups throughout the island that claimed to be part of the BRA. A number of raskol (criminal) gangs that were affiliated with the BRA, equipped largely with weapons salvaged from the fighting in World War II, terrorised villages, engaging in murder, rape and pillage. Bougainville split into several factions, and a civil war began.

Much of the division in this fighting was largely along clan lines; the BIG/BRA was dominated by the Nasioi clan, causing other islanders to view it with suspicion. On the island of Buka north of Bougainville, a local militia formed and drove out the BRA with the help of Papuan troops, during a bloody offensive in September 1990. Multiple agreements were signed but were not honoured by any parties. The BRA leadership of Ona and Kauona fell out with some of the political leaders, such as Kabui. Several other village militias, which together became known as the resistance and were armed by the PNG defence forces, forced the BRA out of their areas.

Papua New Guinea's policy towards Bougainville hardened after the defeat of the incumbent government at the 1992 elections. New prime minister Paias Wingti took a considerably more hardline stance. He angered residents of the Solomon Islands after a bloody raid on one island that was alleged to be supporting the Bougainvilleans. In alliance with the resistance, the Papuan army succeeded in retaking Arawa, the provincial capital, in January 1993. Papuan Foreign Minister Sir Julius Chan attempted to recruit a peacekeeping force from the nations of the Pacific, but Wingti quashed the idea. He subsequently ordered the army to retake the Panguna mine, and was initially successful. However, his government was short-lived. In August 1994 he was replaced as prime minister by Chan.

Chan announced his intention to find a peaceful solution to the conflict. He met with Kauona in the Solomon Islands and arranged for a peace conference to be held in Arawa that October, with security provided by an Australia-led South Pacific Peacekeeping Force. However, the BIG leaders boycotted the conference, claiming that their safety could not be guaranteed. In their absence, Chan's government entered into negotiations with a group of chiefs from the Nasioi clan, headed by Theodore Miriung, a former lawyer for the Panguna Landowners Association. This resulted in the establishment of a Bougainville Transitional Government in April 1995, with its capital in Buka. Miriung was named Prime Minister of the new government, but he frequently clashed with Chan by criticising abuses committed by Papuan soldiers.

By 1996, Chan was beginning to get frustrated at the lack of progress. In January, following a round of negotiations in Cairns, Australia, between the BRA, BTG and the PNG government, a PNG defence force patrol boat fired upon Kabui and the other delegates when they returned to Bougainville. The next month, the home of the BIG's representative in the Solomon Islands, Martin Mirori, was firebombed. Chan decided to abandon attempts at peace, and on 21 March 1996, he gave the go-ahead for an invasion of Bougainville, under new commander of the PNG defence forces, Jerry Singirok.

=== Sandline and ceasefire ===
After five resolutions in the United Nations Commission on Human Rights, a report by the Special Rapporteur on Summary Executions and Disappearances and a resolution from the Security Council as well as mounting pressure from Amnesty International, ICRC and other human rights groups, the governments of Australia and New Zealand ceased providing military support, forcing Chan to begin to look elsewhere. Thus began the Sandline affair, where the government of Papua New Guinea attempted to hire mercenaries from Sandline International, a London-based private military company, composed primarily of former British and South African special forces soldiers, which had been involved in the civil wars in Angola and Sierra Leone. With negotiations with Sandline ongoing and incomplete, Chan ordered the military to invade anyway. In July the PNG defence forces attempted to seize Aropa airport, the island's principal airfield. However, the attack was a disaster, suffering from poor logistical planning and determined resistance by BRA fighters. In September, BRA militants attacked a PNG army camp at Kangu Beach with the help of members of a local militia group, killing twelve PNGDF soldiers and taking five hostage. The following month, Theodore Miriung was assassinated. Although Chan's government attempted to blame the BRA, a subsequent independent investigation implicated members of the PNG defence force and the resistance militias. Discipline and morale was rapidly deteriorating within the ranks of the PNG military, which had been unable to make any substantial progress in penetrating the mountainous interior of the island and reopening the Panguna mine. Chan decided that his best chance to recapture the Panguna mine was with the Sandline mercenaries.

However, this too turned out to be a disaster. News of his intention to hire mercenaries was leaked to the Australian press, and international condemnation followed. Furthermore, when Jerry Singirok heard of the news, he ordered the detaining of all the mercenaries on arrival. In the resulting saga, Prime Minister Chan was forced to resign, and Papua New Guinea came very close to a military coup. Indeed, the officers in charge had the parliament surrounded, but steadfastly refused to go any further. In the end, however, they got their way, with Chan's resignation and the removal of the mercenaries from Papua New Guinean territory.

Sandline sparked a low point in the Bougainvillean war. Since 1997, a ceasefire has largely held on the island. Breaking with Ona, Kauona and Kabui entered into peace talks with the government of Bill Skate in Christchurch, New Zealand, which culminated in the signing of the Lincoln Agreement in January 1998. Under the terms of the agreement, PNG began to withdraw its soldiers from the island and a multinational Peace Monitoring Group was deployed. Legislation to establish a Bougainville Reconciliation Government failed to win approval in the PNG Parliament.

A Bougainville provincial government of the same status as the other eighteen provinces of Papua New Guinea, with John Momis as Governor, was established in January 1999. However, this government was suspended after facing opposition from both the BIG/BRA and BTG. Arrangements were made for the creation of a modified government, to be established in two phases-the first being the Bougainville Constituent Assembly and the second being the elections for the Bougainville People's Congress. Elections were held in May, and Kabui was named president. However, the legality of this was contested by Momis, with the support of a number of tribal chiefs and Resistance leaders. In November, a new body, the Bougainville Interim Provincial Government, was established, headed by Momis. Rapproachment between Kauona and Momis led to an agreement in which the two bodies would act in consultation. An organised reconciliation process began at the tribal level in the early 2000.

Throughout the decade, Ona continued to resist overtures to participate in the new government, declaring himself 'king' of Bougainville before dying of malaria in 2005. In March 2005, Dr Shaista Shameem of the United Nations working group on mercenaries asked Fiji and Papua New Guinea for permission to send a team to investigate the presence of former Fijian soldiers in Bougainville.

The Australian government has estimated that between 15,000 and 20,000 people have died in the Bougainville Conflict. More conservative estimates put the number of combat deaths as 1,000 to 2,000.

=== Foreign media coverage of civil war ===
Cass (1992) argued that The Australian newspaper, in its coverage of the Bougainville conflict, lacked depth and focused on the crisis from Australia's own interests and a conviction that the former territory could not really look after itself. Other researchers pointed out that even though journalists got into Bougainville during the crisis, the coverage was uneven (Cronau, 1994; Denoon & Spriggs, 1992). Dorney argues that, with few exceptions, the Australian media pays scant attention to Australia's former colony unless there is high drama, such as during the Sandline crisis in March 1997, or a disaster relief effort, such as when the Australian Defence Force played a high-profile role during the drought induced famine of 1997–98 (1998, p15). He adds that the rest of the time it is the bizarre and tragic, especially violent crime involving expatriates, that fill the limited agenda. According to Patience (2005), PNG has a public relations problem in terms of its image abroad.

== Post-conflict ==
=== Operation Bel Isi ===
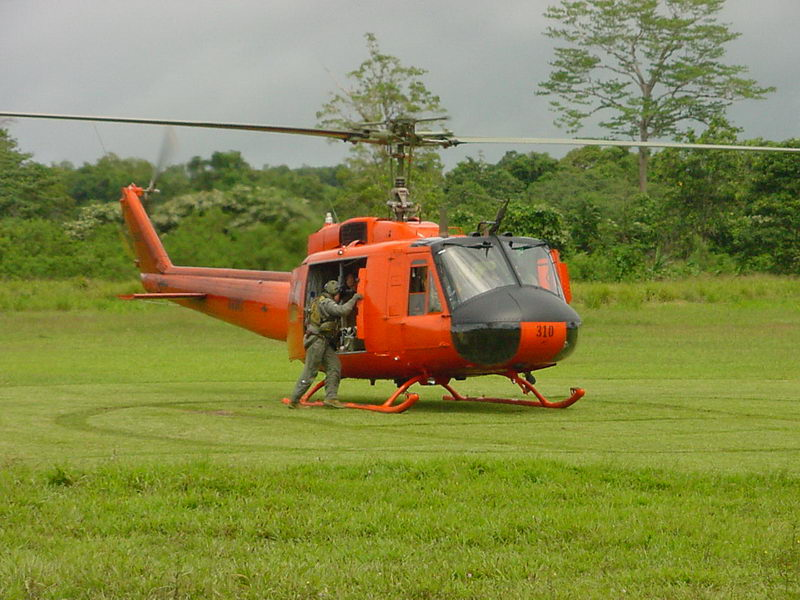
Australian Huey helicopters in Bougainville

The Peace Monitoring Group (PMG) on Bougainville in Papua New Guinea was brought about by the civil unrest on the island in the 1990s. The PNG government requested the Australian and New Zealand governments to provide a monitoring group to oversee the ceasefire on the island. This group was made up of both civilian and defence personnel from Australia, New Zealand, Fiji and Vanuatu. Then Major General General Frank Hickling led the peace monitoring mission, supported by elements of Australia's 8th Brigade which is known to include then Captain Ian Langford. Support remained strong throughout the PMG's deployment. The PMG was established on the island on 1 May 1998 and took over from the New Zealand Truce Monitoring Group which then departed.

The PMG comprised approximately 100 personnel, was unarmed and wore bright yellow shirts and hats. It had no specific legal power although it did have a mandate under the Lincoln Agreement. It remained definitively neutral at all times. In the early stages of its deployment, it acted primarily as a ceasefire monitoring group and spread information about developments in the peace process. Following the Bougainville Peace Agreement, the PMG focused primarily on facilitating the weapons disposal program, in co-operation with the small UN Observer Mission on Bougainville (UNOMB). There was also some logistical support given to the constitutional consultation and drafting process from 2003.

Support was provided to the group via use of the Loloho wharf on the eastern side of the island by naval vessels from Australia and New Zealand as well as the Kieta airfield by weekly C130 Hercules flights from Townsville. Four UH-1 'Huey' helicopters were supplied by Australian 171st Aviation Squadron, which were painted bright red for visibility and utilised to ferry personnel to inland villages inaccessible by foot or vehicle. With more than 8,000 safe flying hours in the skies of Bougainville to their credit, the choppers made their way back to Australia aboard HMAS Kanimbla. Later, air mobility was outsourced to the commercial Hevilift company, which provided two Bell 212 helicopters.

HQ PMG was based in Arawa and comprised approx. 50 personnel providing coordination for all the operations in Bougainville. The majority of personnel lived in local houses in the Arawa township. The Logistical Support Team (LST) at the Loloho wharf comprised approx. 70 personnel and provided such services as catering, dental, medical, IT support, vehicle transport and communications to the outlying team sites. LST members lived in the "Opera House" which was an old storage silo for copper, used when the mine was open. The remaining staff of PMG were located all over Bougainville in team sites monitoring the peace and liaising with local communities. The following locations had team sites in 2000 – Arawa, Sirakatau, Buin, Tonu, Wakunai and Buka.

The Bougainville Peace Agreement decreed that all personnel should be withdrawn from the island by December 2002. However, the group was extended by the applicable governments and withdrew completely by 23 August 2003.

The total cost of Australia's development and military assistance to Bougainville from the financial year 1997–98 until FY 2002–03 was $243.2 million. Over 3500 Australian defence personnel and 300 Australian civilians served in the Peace Monitoring Group during Operation Bel Isi.

=== Autonomy within Papua New Guinea ===
On 30 August 2001, a peace agreement was signed between the PNG government and representatives from Bougainville. It stipulated the creation of an autonomous government for Bougainville with a "home-grown" constitution, the right of Bougainville to hold a referendum on independence in the future, and the disposal of weapons from the conflict. The agreement was largely upheld by both sides. The constitution of Bougainville was developed by 2004, under which the various organs of the Bougainville Government were established. These included the office of President of the Autonomous Region of Bougainville, Bougainville Executive Council, the Bougainville House of Representatives and the region's judiciary.

The autonomous region elects a president, 33 constituency representatives, and one woman and one former Bougainville Revolutionary Army (BRA) combatant from each of the three districts to the autonomous region's House of Representatives, as well as one provincial and three open constituency members to the National Parliament of Papua New Guinea. Elections in Bougainville have been held every five years since 2005, with Kabui elected president in 2005. Kabui unexpectedly died in office in 2008, and former BRA fighter James Tanis 2008 was elected to replace him. Tanis lost the 2010 election to John Momis, who was re-elected in 2015. Momis sought to extend presidential term-limits, allowing him to contest the 2020 election, but this was rejected by both the House of Representatives and the Supreme Court. Ishmael Toroama is the current president, having won the 2020 election.

=== Independence referendum ===
The 2001 peace agreement stipulated that an independence referendum for Bougainville would be held between 10 and 15 years after the autonomous region's government had been formed, which set the deadline in 2020. The referendum was held in November and December 2019, with 98.31% of voters choosing independence, and a turnout of 87.38%. Results were not contested by any parties. The referendum was non-binding, and was followed by consultation between the Bougainville and PNG governments. Agreement was reached that Bougainville would achieve independence and sovereignty no sooner than 2025 and no later than 2027, however this requires ratification from the national parliament and the Papuan prime minister James Marape has not explicitly committed to Bougainville becoming separate from PNG. In March 2025, the Bougainville Leaders Consultation Forum recommended that the date of independence be set for 1 September 2027, but will take effect by 1 September 2030 after it was scheduled back in July 2026.

== Bibliography ==
- Elder, Peter (2005). "Between the Waitman's Wars: 1914–42". In Regan, Anthony; Griffin, Helga-Maria (eds.). Bougainville Before the Conflict. Stranger Journalism. ISBN 9781740761383.
- Griffin, James (2005). "Origins of Bougainville's Boundaries". In Regan, Anthony; Griffin, Helga-Maria (eds.). Bougainville Before the Conflict. Stranger Journalism. ISBN 9781740761383.
- Oliver, Douglas (1991). Black Islanders: A Personal Perspective of Bougainville, 1937–1991. Honolulu: University of Hawaii Press. p. 3. ISBN 0-8248-1434-7.
- Sack, Peter (2005). "German Colonial Rule in the Northern Solomons". In Regan, Anthony; Griffin, Helga-Maria (eds.). Bougainville Before the Conflict. Stranger Journalism. ISBN 9781740761383.
- Spriggs, Matthew (2005). "Bougainville's early history: an archaeological perspective". In Regan, Anthony; Griffin, Helga-Maria (eds.). Bougainville Before the Conflict. Stranger Journalism. ISBN 9781740761383.

== Further information ==
- Wayne Coles-Janess VOD of Bougainville - "Our Island, Our Fight" 1998 available Globally on iTunes. This a link to iTunes UK. Available in most Countries.
- Wayne Coles-Janess. "Inside Bougainville" 1994 ABC ABC Foreign Correspondent Inside Bougainville.
- ABC Foreign Correspondent- World in Focus – Lead Story (1997) Exclusive interview with Francis Ona. Interviewed by Wayne Coles-Janess.
- ABC Foreign Correspondent- Lead Story – Bougainville (1997) by Wayne Coles-Janess.
- Regan, Anthony J. 2010, Light intervention: Lessons from Bougainville. United States Institutes of Peace. See also the review of this book by Victoria Stead, Anthropological Forum, vol 22(3):320–322, 2012.
- Regan, Anthony and Helga Griffin. 2005, Bougainville Before the Conflict. Canberra, Pandanus Books. ISBN 9781740761994
- Robert Young Pelton. "The Hunter, the Hammer, and Heaven: Journeys to Three Worlds Gone Mad". 2002. Guilford, CT: The Lyons Press. ISBN 978-1-58574-416-9.
- The Coconut Revolution (2000) directed by Dom Rotheroe includes a report and interview with Francis Ona and the B.R.A.
- Bougainville – Our Island Our Fight (1998) by the multi-award-winning director Wayne Coles-Janess. The first footage of the war from behind the blockade. The critically acclaimed and internationally award-winning documentary is shown around the world.
- Roderic Alley, "Ethnosecession in Papua New Guinea: The Bougainville Case," in Rajat Ganguly and Ian MacDuff, ed.s, Ethnic Conflict and Secessionism in South Asia and Southeast Asia: Causes, Dynamics, Solutions. 2003. New Delhi, Thousand Oaks, CA: Sage Publications. ISBN 81-7829-202-5, ISBN 0-7619-9604-4.
- The Bougainville conflict: A classic outcome of the resource-curse effect?, Michael Cornish
- Chronology of Bougainville Civil War, By Michael J. Field, AFP, 30 January 1998
- Operation Bel Isi Website
