= Thomas Tari =

Bougainvillean soldier and politician (1969–2023)

Member of the Bougainville House of Representatives
- In office 2015–2023
- President: John Momis (2015–2020); Ishmael Toroama (2020–2023)
- Constituency: South Bougainville Veterans

Personal details
- Born: August 8, 1969
- Died: May 5, 2023 (aged 53)
- Known for: Kangu Beach Massacre (1996)

Military service
- Allegiance: Bougainville Revolutionary Army
- Rank: Commander
- Unit: "H" Company

Thomas Tari (8 August 1969 – 5 May 2023) was a Bougainvillean politician and war veteran. He was from Buin Rural LLG in South Bougainville District. During the Bougainville conflict, Tari joined the Bougainville Revolutionary Army (BRA) and rose to prominence after the 1996 Kangu Beach Massacre. It was the greatest loss of life suffered by the Papua New Guinea Defence Force (PNGDF) in a single operation—12 PNGDF soldiers were killed—and the release of five prisoners of war, negotiated by Tari, facilitated the 1997 ceasefire. Tari used the weapons and influence he gained on Kangu Beach to usurp the command of the Bougainville Revolutionary Army (BRA)'s "H" Company.

Tari joined the pro-peace faction after the BRA split over the peace process in 1997. From 2005 to 2007, Tari led the Bougainville Freedom Fighters (BFF) against secessionist holdouts such as Damien Koike and Noah Musingku. The BFF was a gang formed by Tari's initial refusal to disarm and was allegedly funded by the Autonomous Bougainville Government (ABG). Tari actively campaigned for the ABG to compensate war veterans. In 2015, Tari was elected Member of the Bougainville House of Representatives for South Bougainville Veterans. He was re-elected in 2020 and served as Minister for Police and Minister for Health under President Ishmael Toroama. Tari died of illness in 2023 during his second term.

== Early life ==
Thomas Tari was born on 8 August 1969. He was from Laguai Village in Buin Rural LLG, South Bougainville District.

== Career ==
=== Bougainville Revolutionary Army ===
The Bougainville conflict began in 1988 and the Bougainville Revolutionary Army (BRA) unilaterally declared independence from Papua New Guinea (PNG) in 1990. Numerous young men, including Thomas Tari, joined the BRA.

Tari was one of the perpetrators of the Kangu Beach Massacre of September 1996, which served as retaliation for the rape of Bougainvillean women by drunken Papua New Guinean soldiers. Kangu Beach was the largest loss of life in one operation for the Papua New Guinea Defence Force (PNGDF). Twelve soldiers were killed and the five survivors were taken captive, leading to a decrease in morale.

Tari became well known because he led negotiations with the PNG's delegates for the prisoners of war. He became a household name on Bougainville, provoking the envy of BRA commander Damien Koike.

Tari's men also came into control of the armory at Kangu Beach, including 60 automatic weapons, an 80 mm mortar, and a substantial amount of grenades and ammunition, effectively making him a warlord. Tari's right-hand man killed the "H" Company commander Paul Bobby in 1998, as well as his two brothers, and Tari assumed command of "H" Company.

In 1997, the BRA over whether to join the peace talks. Francis Ona opposed the talks and seceded from the BRA to form the Me'ekamui Defence Force, which split into numerous factions after his death. Tari and the majority of the BRA, led by Ishmael Toroama, continued with the peace process, eventually leading to the creation of the Autonomous Bougainville Government (ABG).

=== Bougainvillean Freedom Fighters ===
Tari was put in charge of the containment and disposal of weapons in Buin. After the containment stage ended in 2005, Tari refused to dispose of the weapons—violating the peace process—and rearmed his men by breaking into the containers. The former "H" company became a gang known as the Bougainville Freedom Fighters (BFF), led by Tari. Tari came into conflict with Koike, the leader of a Me'ekamui gang, leading to deaths on both sides; each wanted the other dead. In November 2006, Tari led an attempt to capture Noah Musingku, another factional Me'ekamui leader. The BFF retreated after one of its members were wounded; the combatant later died in hospital.

It has been alleged that the ABG funded BFF in order to eliminate secessionist holdouts, but abandoned the plan after 2007. The ABG funded the reconciliation process between Tari, Koike, and Musingku in 2009 and 2010.

War veterans such as Tari and his men actively campaigned for compensation from the ABG. For example, Tari's gang hijacked ABG President John Momis' car in 2005 to make Momis pay attention to their demands. According to Stan Starygin, such methods, which might be considered outside PNG as "'piracy', 'blackmail' and 'hijacking' ... are routine in the PNG traditional culture", although they are still criminal offenses.

=== Bougainville Autonomous Government ===
In 2015, Tari was elected Member of the Bougainville House of Representatives for the Former Combatants of South Bougainville. He served his first term under President Momis. Re-elected in 2020, Tari served as Minister for Police and then Minister for Health under President Ishmael Toroama. However, Toroama relieved Tari of his duties on the Bougainville Executive Council because of Tari's declining health. Tari died of illness on 5 May 2023.
