= New Bougainville Party =

Political party

The New Bougainville Party (NBP) is a political party in the Autonomous Region of Bougainville in Papua New Guinea.

It was founded on 22 April 2005 by John Momis, Governor of Bougainville Province from 1999 to 2005, with former Premier Alexis Sarei among other figures involved in its creation. Momis lost the 2005 presidential election to Joseph Kabui and resigned the party leadership, which was assumed by Ezekiel Massat. The party immediately formed a grand coalition with Kabui's Bougainville People's Congress, citing a desire to show that the province was "politically rising". Massat subsequently served as Minister for Police in the Kabui government. In April 2007, the party protested a reshuffle of the Kabui ministry which did not promote any of their MPs.

In December 2007, government ministers Massat and Patrick Nisira resigned from the party to sit as independents in protest at a motion by their colleagues for the establishment of a formal opposition in Bougainville. The party endorsed Raymond Hakena, a former member of 1980s band Sanguma, in the 2008 presidential by-election after Kabui's death, but lost to James Tanis. Momis returned as leader of the party in August 2009.

Momis won the presidency at the 2010 election, with the party also performing well in the legislative elections. Sarei and former Premier Leo Hannett were among the NBP candidates elected to office. Momis and Vice-President Nisira were re-elected under the party banner at the 2015 election.
