= Bougainville Executive Council =

The Bougainville Executive Council is the cabinet of the Autonomous Bougainville Government, chaired by the President of the Autonomous Region of Bougainville.

== Members ==
The current executive council was formed after the 2020 Bougainvillean general election.

Name	Portfolios
Ishmael Toroama	President of the Autonomous Region of Bougainville
Patrick Nisira	Vice-President of the Autonomous Region of Bougainville; Minister for Economic Development
Ezekiel Massat	Attorney General; Minister for Justice; Minister for Post-Referendum Dialogue
Mathias Salas	Minister for Finance
Yolande Geraldine Paul	Minister for Primary Industries and Marine Resources
Theonila Roka Matbob	Minister for Education
Emmanuel Carlos Kaetavara	Minister for Policing
Thomas Tarii	Minister for Health
Thompson J. Gitovea	Minister for Community Development
Joseph Kim Swuamaru	Minister for Technical Services
Thomas Pataaku	Minister for Local Government
Joseph Mona	Minister for Public Services
Rodney Osioko	Minister for Minerals and Energy
Amanda Masono	Minister for Land, Planning, the Environment and Conservation
