= John Bika =

Papua New Guinean-Bougainvillean politician

John Bika (died 11 September 1989) was a Papua New Guinea and Bougainvillean politician.

Bika was the North Solomons Provincial Assembly MP for Nasioi-Pirung and Minister for Commerce and Liquor Licensing in the provincial administration of North Solomons Premier Joseph Kabui in 1989, at the beginning of the Bougainville Civil War. He had chaired a provincial committee into the issue of Bougainvillean secession that had recommended that Bougainville remain within Papua New Guinea but with increased autonomy. He was assassinated at his home in Toboroi village by Bougainville Revolutionary Army militants on 11 September 1989. He had been due to fly to Port Moresby the following day as one of the signatories to a proposed "peace package" to end the conflict.

Bika was shot dead in front of his wife, Helen Bika, and was survived by five children. In the aftermath of the assassination, the Papua New Guinean government announced a 200,000 kina reward for the capture of BRA leader Francis Ona.

Bika's family have campaigned for compensation from the Autonomous Bougainville Government in recent years.
