= List of wars involving Papua New Guinea =

This is a list of wars involving Papua New Guinea, German New Guinea or Territory of New Guinea.

Conflict	Combatant 1	Combatant 2	Results	Casualties
Battle of Bita Paka (11 September 1914) Raising the Australian flag in Angoram, 16 December 1914.	Germany: German New Guinea	Australia	Defeat	30 Melanese police killed, 10 wounded
Australian occupation of German New Guinea (September– October 1914) Australian Fleet entering Simpson Harbour in 1914.	German Empire; German New Guinea	Australia; Japan	Defeat	85 killed and 15 wounded
New Guinea Campaign (1942–1945) Australian forces attack Japanese positions near Buna.	Australia: Papua; New Guinea; United States; United Kingdom; Netherlands	Empire of Japan	Victory	42,000 total
Coconut War (August–September 1980)	Vanuatu; Papua New Guinea; Solomon Islands	Nagriamel rebels Support: France; Phoenix Foundation	Victory	?
Bougainville Civil War (1988–1998) Ambulances in Arawa, 1998 destroyed in conflict.	Papua New Guinea: Buka Liberation Front; Bougainville Resistance Force; Supported by: Australia; Indonesia	Bougainville Interim Government (BIG): Bougainville Revolutionary Army (BRA); Supported by: Solomon Islands; Fiji (alleged)	Military stalemate: Bougainville Peace Agreement; Establishment of the Autonomous Bougainville Government; Bougainville scheduled to be an independent country around 2027	300+ PNGDF soldiers killed Several thousand wounded
