= Magdalene Toroansi =

Politician in the Autonomous Region of Bougainville (PNG)

Magdalene Toroansi is a Papua New Guinean diplomat and politician. She is from the Autonomous Region of Bougainville, and was Minister for Women from 2005 and 2008. In 2010 and 2020, she ran as a candidate for President of the Autonomous Region of Bougainville, but was unsuccessful on both occasions.

== Career ==
Toroansi is from Central Bougainville. She studied at the University of Papua New Guinea and then worked in the Papua New Guinea Department of Foreign Affairs for twenty years. During this, she was posted overseas to the Republic of Korea, as well as to the USA.

Toroansi was elected to the House of Representatives in 2005 to represent the Women's (South) constituency. She defeated the incumbent woman MP Theresa Jaintong. She was sacked from her position as Women's Minister in the cabinet of President Joseph Kabui on 3 June 2008. She lost her role as she was the only member of the cabinet to oppose Kabui's contract with a Canadian mining company to extract minerals from Panguna mine and take 70% of profits out of the country. During Kabui's presidency she also held the roles of Minister for Education and Minister for Local Government. In 2009 she held the role of Chair of the Public Accounts Committee of Bougainville. Her appointment to these positions, according to Cate Morris, demonstrates that "female politicians from Bougainville" can hold "the highest positions held by women in politics throughout the Pacific, including that of Australia and New Zealand".

In 2010, Toroansi was the only woman candidate to contest the Autonomous Bougainville Government (ABG) presidential election. She stood against the then-president James Tanis, as well as John Momis, Reuben Siara, Robert Atsir, Martin Miriori and Sylvester Niu.

In 2020, Toroansi was one of two women to enter as a candidate in the presidential election; the other was Ruby Mirinka. Neither were elected.
