= Mathias Salas =

Papua New Guinean politician

Minister of Finance
- In office 2 October 2020 – 19 September 2023
- President: Ishmael Toroama

Minister of Finance
- In office 23 June 2005 – 2010
- President: Joseph Kabui

Minister of Minerals, Gas and Petroleum Exploration
- In office 23 June 2005 – 2010

Acting Vice-President of the Autonomous Region of Bougainville
- In office 7 June 2008 – 19 January 2009
- President: John Tabinaman (Acting) James Tanis
- Preceded by: John Tabinaman
- Succeeded by: Ezekiel Massat

Member of the Bougainville House of Representatives
- Incumbent
- Assumed office 2020
- Preceded by: Nicholas Daku
- Constituency: North Nasioi
- In office 2005–2010
- Preceded by: none (constituency created)
- Succeeded by: Nicholas Daku

Personal details
- Party: Bougainville People's Congress

Mathias Roman Salas is a Bougainvillean politician and former Cabinet minister. Salas is a former banker.

In the 2005 Bougainvillean general election Salas was elected to the first Bougainville parliament as a member of the Bougainville People's Congress. On 23 June 2005 he was appointed Minister of Finance and Minerals, Gas and Petroleum Exploration in the cabinet of President Joseph Kabui. In 2008 he served as acting vice-President. He subsequently lost his seat in the 2010 election.

Salas was re-elected to parliament in the 2020 Bougainvillean general election. On 2 October 2020 he was appointed Minister of Finance and Treasury in the cabinet of Ishmael Toroama. Salas delivered three annual budgets for the Autonomous Bougainville Government, focusing on regional development. In 2022, Salas questioned the National Government of Papua New Guinea over a discrepancy between the amount of money budgeted for Bougainville and the amount that had been appropriated. In September 2023, Salas was removed from this post in a Cabinet reshuffle, and replaced by Robin Wilson, the member from Terra constituency.
