= Elections in Bougainville =

Bougainville is an autonomous region in Papua New Guinea. At regional level, Bougainville elects a President and a House of Representatives. A non-binding independence referendum was held in 2019. In this referendum, 98% of voters voted in favour of independence.

== Presidential elections ==
- 2005 Bougainvillean presidential election
- 2008 Bougainvillean presidential election
- 2010 Bougainvillean presidential election
- 2015 Bougainvillean general election
- 2020 Bougainvillean general election

== Legislative elections ==
- 2005 Bougainvillean general election
- 2010 Bougainvillean general election
- 2015 Bougainvillean general election
- 2020 Bougainvillean general election

== Referendums ==
- 2019 Bougainvillean independence referendum

== See also ==
- Elections in Papua New Guinea
