= Peter Tsiamalili =

Papua New Guinean civil servant

Peter Sobby Tsiamalili (1952 or 1953 – 15 April 2007) was a Papua New Guinean civil servant who served as the first chief administrator of the Autonomous Region of Bougainville (ABG) following successful elections in June 2005. Tsiamalili also served as a diplomat and ambassador representing Papua New Guinea abroad in Fiji and Belgium.

== Early life as a porter ==
Tsiamalili enrolled at the Administrative College of Papua New Guinea in Port Moresby during the 1960s. He studied to become a government officer, which is commonly called a "kiap" by Papuans.

== Career ==
Following the completion of his education and training, Tsiamalili worked his way up the bureaucratic ladder to become the provincial secretary of the North Solomons Province, which is now known as the Autonomous Region of Bougainville. Tsiamalili served as provincial secretary under the government of then North Solomons Province Premier Joseph Kabui. He remained secretary until the outbreak of the nine-year-long Bougainville civil war beginning in 1989. The North Solomons (Bougainville) provincial government was dismissed at the beginning of the conflict, making Tsiamalili the last provincial secretary and Kabui the last premier before the civil war. Tsiamalili ultimately had to flee Bougainville for his own safety during the early stages of the conflict.

He switched government careers, joining the PNG Foreign Affairs Department. Tsiamalili initially served as a diplomat at Papua New Guinea's mission to the United Nations in New York City. He later became the Papua New Guinean ambassador to both Fiji and Belgium, from which he was also accredited to other European nations, including the Netherlands beginning in 1994. Following his stints as an ambassador, Tsiamalili was appointed to be the secretary for the PNG Foreign Affairs Department.

The government of former Prime Minister Bill Skate next appointed Tsiamalili to be secretary of Department of Personnel Management (DPM) during the late 1990s.

== Chief Administrator of Bougainville ==
Landmark Bougainville elections were held in June 2005 which restored the autonomous government of Bougainville (ABG). Tsiamalili co-ordinated the successful elections and restoration of Bougainville's government, in which Joseph Kabui was elected the first President of the Autonomous Region of Bougainville.

The PNG government cabinet under Michael Somare appointed Tsiamalili as the first administrator of the Autonomous Region of Bougainville following the elections. Tsiamalili remained the top bureaucrat within the PNG government, while simultaneously playing an important behind-the-scenes role in the Bougainville peace process. He also oversaw the establishment of Bougainville's fledgling public service as the island's administrator.

== Death ==
Peter Tsiamalili died unexpectedly in his sleep on 15 April 2007, in his home village of Torokina, Amun, in southwestern Bougainville at the age of 54. The cause of death was believed to be heart problems. Tsiamalili was survived by his wife, Ruth, and four children.

His body was transported to the Buka General Hospital morgue in Buka, the capital of the Bougainvillean government, before being flown to Port Moresby for an autopsy.

Bougainville's first President, Joseph Kabui, described Tsiamalili's death as a tragic loss to Bougainville because much of the reconciliation and redevelopment process on the island was spearheaded by Tsiamalili, "Now I am the first president and he (late Tsiamalili) was the first chief administrator for our autonomous government system. It will be hard for me to get another chief administrator." (Tsiamalili had served as provincial secretary under Kabui before the Bougainvillean civil war). Kabui also stated that Tsiamalili greatest achievement was making the Bougainville peace agreement into a tangible reality, "Late Peter, with all his wealth of experience and exposure both nationally and internationally, was the most appropriate person to be able to help us, the politicians, to bring into being, here on the ground, here on Bougainville, the whole ABG, what the whole ABG is all about."

Tsiamalili's funeral was held at St Joseph's Catholic Church in Port Moresby. Dignitaries at the funeral included Governor-General Paulias Matane, PNG Prime Minister Michael Somare, Bougainville President Joseph Kabui, Bougainville Affairs Minister Sir Peter Barter, Chief Secretary Isaac Lupari, as well as other politicians, diplomats and relatives. Tsiamalili was buried in his home village of Torokina in Amun on Bougainville.

There was political fallout from Tsiamalili's burial when several Bougainvillean civil servants and government officials attended the ceremony while intoxicated, including then Vice-president Joseph Watawi and the acting chief administrator Patrick Koles. Watawi and other officials were reportedly drinking beer while others were mourning at the funeral, and were immediately asked to leave the village.

The Chiefs of Torokina district, who represented the Tsiamalili family as well as the people of Amun, Tokoro, Konua, Kerika and Torokina, expressed disgust over the incident and demanded an explanation from the Bougainvillean autonomous government with 48 hours. Tsiamalili's younger brother, Lawrence Buruwei, called the actions a disgrace. Other officials and former combatants during the Bougainville civil war demanded that Watawi and the others be fired for their behaviour.

President Joseph Kabui and the Autonomous Government of Bougainville apologised for the incident. On 4 May 2007, five thousand people held a protest in Buka calling for the ouster of Vice-president Watawi and acting administrator Patrick Koles for breaking social taboos by drinking at the burial. Petitions were given to Kabui by a women's NGO and former combatants of the Bougainville conflict calling for their immediate removal from office. Under pressure, President Kabui dismissed Watawi from his government in May 2007, which he called "a painful decision to make". Kabui named John Tabinaman as the new vice-president.
