= Rotokas (disambiguation) =

Rotokas may refer to:

- Rotokas language, a language spoken in Papua New Guinea
- Rotokas alphabet, the alphabet used to write the Rotokas language
- Rotokas Record, a weapons surrender accord signed in 2001
