= John Tabinaman =

Papua New Guinean politician (c.1952–2021)

Vice President of the Autonomous Region of Bougainville
- In office 15 May 2007 – 19 January 2009 Co-leading with Mathias Salas and
- President: Joseph Kabui (2007–2008); James Tanis (2009)
- Preceded by: Joseph Watawi
- Succeeded by: Ezekiel Massat

Acting President of the Autonomous Region of Bougainville
- In office 7 June 2008 - 6 January 2009
- Deputy: Himself (as Vice President) Mathias Salas (as Vice President)
- Preceded by: Joseph Kabui
- Succeeded by: James Tanis

John Tabinaman (c. 1952 – 7 November 2021) was the Acting President of the Autonomous Region of Bougainville, in Papua New Guinea, from 7 June 2008 to 6 January 2009.

== Political career ==
=== As Vice President ===
Tabinaman was a member of the regional House of Representatives for Mahari constituency, elected in 2005 with 42.9 percent of the vote in a five-way race. Tabinaman was sworn in as Vice President of Bougainville on 15 May 2007 and also held the ministerial portfolios for Public Service, Planning and Implementation, and Peace and Autonomy. He succeeded Joseph Watawi, who was demoted after an incident of public drunkenness at Amun village caused a major scandal.

=== As Acting President ===
Following the death of Bougainville President Joseph Kabui on 7 June 2008, Tabinaman took over as Acting President until a new election was held. Tabinaman said that the existing procedure of holding a new popular election would probably be followed, while also noting the possibility of a constitutional amendment that would instead allow Parliament to elect one of its members as president. Planning for a new popular election subsequently began; it was held in December 2008, with James Tanis emerging as the winner.

=== As minister ===
In June 2015 he was announced as Minister for Lands, Physical Planning, Environment and Conservation in the cabinet of President John Momis. He stayed In this role until at least 2020 under Momis.

=== Death ===
He died on 7 November 2021 at Buka General Hospital in Bougainville after a short illness. He was the only MP to win in all four polls in Bougainville's history. A by-election was held in Mahari constituency, which was won by Carol Poli, bringing the number of women in the Bougainville House of Representatives to five.

Preceded by none	Member of the Bougainville House of Representatives for Mahari; 2005–2021	Succeeded by Carol Poli
Preceded by Joseph Watawi	Vice President of the Autonomous Region of Bougainville; 15 May 2007 – 7 June 2008	Succeeded by Mathias Salas (acting)
Preceded by Joseph Kabui	President of the Autonomous Region of Bougainville (acting); 7 June 2008 – 6 January 2009	Succeeded by James Tanis
