= Vice-President of the Autonomous Region of Bougainville =

- Emblem of the Autonomous Region of Bougainville
- Incumbent; Ezekiel Massat since 21 October 2025
- Appointer: President
- Term length: Five years, renewable once
- Inaugural holder: Joseph Watawi
- Formation: 15 June 2005

The vice-president of the Autonomous Region of Bougainville is the second highest office in the province, which is an autonomous region of Papua New Guinea. The current vice-president is Ezekiel Massat, who was sworn in on 21 October 2025 after his appointment by President Ishmael Toroama.

The vice-president is appointed by the president from among the members of the House of Representatives from one region other than the region from which the president comes from.

== List of vice-presidents of the Autonomous Region of Bougainville ==
No.	Vice-President	Took office	Left office	Tenure	Party	Election	President
1	Joseph Watawi (1960–2021)	15 June 2005	15 May 2007 (Note: Watawi was dismissed from the vice-presidency by President Joseph Kabui after an incident of public drunkenness.)	1 year, 334 days	Bougainville People's Congress	2005	Joseph Kabui
2	John Tabinaman (c. 1952–2021)	15 May 2007	19 January 2009 (Note: Tabinaman acceded to the presidency upon the death of President Joseph Kabui.)	1 year, 249 days	Unknown	–	Joseph Kabui
–	Mathias Salas (born TBA); Acting	7 June 2008	19 January 2009	226 days	Bougainville People's Congress	–	John Tabinaman
3	Ezekiel Massat (born TBA); 1st time	19 January 2009	10 June 2010	1 year, 142 days	Independent	2008	James Tanis
4	Patrick Nisira (born 1972); 1st time	10 June 2010	22 February 2017 (Note: Nisira resigned from the vice-presidency in order to contest the 2017 Papua New Guinean general election.)	6 years, 257 days	Independent	2010	John Momis
4	Patrick Nisira (born 1972); 1st time	10 June 2010	22 February 2017	6 years, 257 days	Independent	2015	John Momis
5	Raymond Masono (?–2021)	22 February 2017	25 September 2020	3 years, 216 days	Unknown	–	John Momis
(4)	Patrick Nisira (born 1972); 2nd time	25 September 2020	21 October 2025	5 years, 26 days	Independent	2020	Ishmael Toroama
(3)	Ezekiel Massat (born TBA); 2nd time	21 October 2025	Incumbent	325 days	Independent	2025	Ishmael Toroama
