= 2019 Bougainvillean independence referendum =

- 23 November – 7 December 2019
- Do you agree for Bougainville to have: 1. Greater autonomy 2. Independence

Results
Choice	Votes	%
Greater autonomy	3,043	1.69%
Independence	176,928	98.31%
Valid votes	179,971	99.39%
Invalid or blank votes	1,096	0.61%
Total votes	181,067	100.00%
Registered voters/turnout	207,213	87.38%

A non-binding independence referendum was held in Bougainville, an autonomous region of Papua New Guinea, between 23 November and 7 December 2019. The referendum question presented a choice between greater autonomy within Papua New Guinea and full independence; voters voted overwhelmingly (98.31%) for independence.

The referendum was a result of a 2001 agreement between the government of Papua New Guinea and the Autonomous Bougainville Government that ended a civil war fought from 1988 to 1998. The vote was non-binding, and the government of Papua New Guinea had the final authority of decision on the political status of Bougainville. Observers said that the clear result would make it difficult for Papua New Guinea to ignore or delay the result, but that independence could take years to achieve.

In July 2021, an agreement was reached between the governments of Papua New Guinea and Bougainville, under which Bougainville would gain independence by 2027 pending ratification by Papua New Guinea's parliament. In July 2026, the Bougainville Independence Leaders Consultation Forum recommended 1 September 2030 as the target date for independence, though the Papua New Guinea parliament had yet to ratify the agreement.

== Background ==
Discussions about an independent Bougainville had been held as early as 1968. Following a meeting in Port Moresby between the two Bougainville members of the House of Assembly (Paul Lapun and Donatus Mola) and around 25 Bougainvilleans, a proposal was put forward in the House of Assembly to hold a referendum to decide whether the island should remain part of Papua New Guinea, join the Solomon Islands, or become independent. However, no vote was held. After Papua New Guinea became independent from Australia in 1975, Bougainville was given provincial status in 1976.

In 1988 tensions erupted into a civil war between the Bougainville Revolutionary Army and Papua New Guinea government forces. One key issue was the Panguna mine, which closed in 1989. The civil war ended with a ceasefire in 1998, followed with the 2001 Bougainville Peace Agreement. The agreement established the Autonomous Bougainville Government, and mandated a referendum on the independence of Bougainville to be held 10–15 years after the election of the first Autonomous Bougainville Government, which was slated to be June 2020 at the latest. The referendum would be non-binding, and the final decision would rest with the Papua New Guinean government.

In November 2019, Raymond Masono, Vice-President of the Autonomous Region of Bougainville, campaigned that he would plan to reopen the Panguna mine if the referendum resulted in a vote for independence. Panguna had closed in 1989 due to the civil war and is now estimated to hold copper worth up to $60 billion. With independence, all of Papua New Guinea's interests in the mine would transfer to Bougainville, giving it a 60% share in all projects and retaining all mining licences. The remaining 40% would be left for investors to bid on.

== Planning ==
The vote was originally scheduled for 15 June 2019, but was delayed to 17 October amid allegations that the national government was slow to provide most of the promised funding for the referendum. The referendum was delayed again to 23 November at the request of the Bougainville Referendum Commission to ensure the credibility of the referendum roll so more people can vote. Both governments said this delay would be the last. Voting was planned to take place over two weeks, from 23 November to 7 December.

The vote faced a high degree of difficulty to organise, with most of the population in small hamlets and villages, and about half the population being illiterate.

In October 2018 former Taoiseach of Ireland Bertie Ahern was appointed to chair the Bougainville Referendum Commission, which was responsible for preparing the referendum.

=== Voters ===
In November the BRC completed the official "certified voter list" to be used in polling for the referendum. The final number of eligible voters was 206,731, out of a total population of nearly 300,000. Males undergoing the upe rite of passage were allowed to vote at special male-only polling stations. Bougainvilleans living in other parts of Papua New Guinea, or in Australia and Solomon Islands, were also allowed to vote.

Registered voters
Voting District	Men	Women	Unknown gender	Total
Voters residing in Bougainville	98,565	95,371	80	194,016
Voters outside Bougainville	6,846	5,844	25	12,715
Total	105,411	101,215	105	206,731

=== Question ===
The question put to voters was:

Do you agree for Bougainville to have: (1) Greater Autonomy (2) Independence?

== Results ==
The results of the referendum were announced on 11 December. Over 98% of valid ballots were cast in favor of independence. Prior to the election, it was widely expected that the independence option would win, with The Guardian reporting an estimate of 90% in favor of independence.

An official reported that the referendum went "better than we expected," and that voters were enthusiastic, while observers from Divine Word University said that the voting took place in an atmosphere of celebration.

Choice	Votes	%
Independence	176,928	98.31
Greater autonomy	3,043	1.69
Total	179,971	100.00
Valid votes	179,971	99.39
Invalid/blank votes	1,096	0.61
Total votes	181,067	100.00
Registered voters/turnout	207,213	87.38
Source: Bougainville Referendum Commission

On 24 January 2020 the result was declared "Petition Free", confirming that no appeals had been received within 40 days against the conduct or the result of the referendum and that none could be accepted in future. On the same day, the December result was commended by the Referendum Commission to the governments and the referendum process formally closed.

== Aftermath ==
Following the announcements of the result, John Momis, President of the Autonomous Region of Bougainville, said, "at least psychologically, we feel liberated." Papua New Guinea's Minister for Bougainville Affairs Puka Temu said, "the outcome is a credible one," but also stated that Papua New Guinea should have time to absorb the result. As the referendum was non-binding, independence will need to be negotiated between leaders from Bougainville and Papua New Guinea. The final decision on Bougainville's status depends on the National Parliament of Papua New Guinea. Rod McGuirk of Time noted that "the process of becoming a separate nation could take years to achieve."

Papua New Guinean Prime Minister James Marape acknowledged the referendum results and stated that he would only commit his government to develop "a road map that leads to a lasting peace settlement" in consultation with Bougainville authorities. Papuan New Guinean officials were concerned that Bougainvillean independence would set a precedent for copycat secession movements in other provinces such as East New Britain, New Ireland, and Enga.

Jonathan Pryke, director of the Pacific Islands program at the Lowy Institute in Sydney, stated that the referendum's results were disadvantageous for Papua New Guinea, adding that, "[i]f there were to be a smaller majority, say 55 or 65 percent, the PNG government could have found a way to justify really stretching this out and having a period of negotiation that could last years or decades. Now with such a phenomenal majority, it’s much harder for them to do that."

Damien Cave of The New York Times reported that the referendum would serve as an inspiration for voters in the 2020 New Caledonian referendum for independence from France. Cave noted that, as with other Pacific countries, Bougainville will likely make pleas to Australia and New Zealand for assistance in developing its institutions while China and potentially the United States may offer diplomatic and economic partnerships once independence is achieved. China is seeking to incorporate an independent Bougainville into its Belt and Road Initiative.

== Negotiations ==
Negotiations on the outcome of the referendum began on 17 May 2021. Bougainville President Ishmael Toroama, who took over from Momis in 2020, stated his wish to see Bougainville become independent by June 2025. Marape for his part cautioned against setting a specific timetable. While Marape and his government have recognized the results of the referendum, he has expressed reluctance at granting Bougainville independence for fear it will potentially result in the breakup of the country. Toroama warned that anything short of independence was not an option for Bougainville.

In the meantime, Toroama launched the Independence Ready Mission to prepare the region for independence. He expressed hope of obtaining self-government by 2022, a prelude to full sovereignty. On 7 July 2021, Toroama and Marape announced that the region will become independent by 2027. However, the agreement requires ratification from Papua New Guinea's parliament before the region is granted independence. In early December 2021, Toroama appealed for the process to advance, expressing dissatisfaction over the pace of negotiations. This led to a joint statement by Marape and Toroama on giving Bougainville independence between 2025 and 2027 via a framework known as the Era Kone Covenant that will detail the constitutional process, seek approval from both Papua New Guinea and Bougainville's cabinets by 31 January 2022, and begin two months later if accepted. On 25 February 2022 a commission was sworn in to draft a constitution for Bougainville. In April 2022, the Autonomous Bougainville Government and the Government of Papua New Guinea finalised the Era Kone Covenant on the mechanisms by which the Parliament of Papua New Guinea will ratify the referendum results. Under the terms of the agreement, the ratification process should begin in 2023 with independence occurring no earlier than 2025 and no later than 2027. The Papua New Guinean parliament took up the issue in the 2023 session and the parliamentary committee on Bougainville affairs, which was suspended for the referendum, resumed.

In April 2024, Papua New Guinea prime minister James Marape stated that his government is preparing to bring forward instruments to implement the referendum results in the Parliament of Papua New Guinea.

A draft constitution for a Republic of Bougainville was published by the Autonomous Bougainville Government in May 2024. There is some contention between the National Parliament and Bougainville. The former prefers the required majority of parliamentary voting for acceptance of the creation of an independent State of Bougainville to be two-thirds, while the latter wants it to be a simple majority of 50%. In March 2025, the Bougainville Independence Leaders Consultation Forum (BILCF) recommended the date for independence as 1 September 2027. In November 2025, the Bougainville Constituent Assembly (BCA) was officially established to lead the constitutional process. It will debate and discuss the draft constitution in order to prepare a finalized document for national ratification. In July 2026, the BILCF changed their recommended date for independence to 1 September 2030.

On 6 August 2026, the Joint Supervisory Body, the organ in which a delegation from the government of Papua New Guinea, led by Bougainville Affairs Minister Manasseh Makiba, has been negotiating with a delegation from the Autonomous Bougainville Government, led by Vice President and Attorney-General Ezekiel Masat, signed its final consultation documents which advocated for independence to be respected. Papua New Guinea's parliament then announced that it would be having debate on if the independence referendum should be respected on August 27.

== See also ==
- 2019 in Oceania
- 1969 Western New Guinea Act of Free Choice
- 1999 East Timorese independence referendum
- 2006 Montenegrin independence referendum
- 2011 South Sudanese independence referendum
- New Caledonia independence referendums (1987, 2018, 2020, 2021)
- 2024 New Caledonia unrest
