= Theodore Miriung =

Papua New Guinean assassinated politician and judge

Theodore Miriung (died 12 October 1996) was a politician and judge in Bougainville, Papua New Guinea. He was Premier of the Bougainville Transitional Government from April 1995 until his death.

== Professional career ==
Miriung was born at Poma village in the Kieta district of Bougainville and was educated at the Tunuru Catholic Mission and at Chabai. He studied for the priesthood at the St Peter Chanel seminary in Ulapia for three years from 1966, but then left the seminary and went to work for mining company CRA Exploration. Miriung studied law at the University of Papua New Guinea from 1969 to 1973 and was admitted to the bar in 1974. He briefly ran a private legal practice in Arawa in 1976 and then joined the public service, rising through the ranks as provincial legal officer and then provincial secretary in Bougainville and then Chief Land Titles Commissioner for Papua New Guinea. He was appointed an acting National Court judge in 1988. In 1991, he advised the Bougainville Revolutionary Army on their planned Bougainville Interim Government, and was often reported to have been a "legal adviser" to the rebels. He left in February 1992 after a dispute, but reportedly remained in contact with the rebels.

== Peace process and Premiership ==
As a figure with ties to both sides of the Bougainville Civil War, Miriung became an influential figure in attempts c. 1994 to reach a peaceful solution to the war, attending the Arawa Peace Conference and being involved in the establishment of a "peace zone" in North Nasioi. In November 1994, Miriung and Prime Minister of Papua New Guinea Julius Chan signed the Mirigini Charter, establishing a Bougainville Transitional Government to replace the North Solomons Provincial Government that had been suspended in 1990. The Assembly of the transitional government met in April 1995, and on 10 April elected Miriung as Premier of the Bougainville Transitional Government. Miriung was a key moderate figure in peace negotiations between the PNG government and the BRA, but faced challenges on both sides: the BRA dismissed the BTG as a "puppet government", while the PNG Government suspected Miriung of working with the BRA and restricted his movements at times. He differed with the PNG Government on a resolution to the conflict, condemning their attempts to end the war through a military offensive and extrajudicial killings, while supporting a more expansive concept of autonomy than the national government, eventually coming out in support of an eventual referendum on independence months before his death. Shortly before his assassination, Papua New Guinean defence minister Mathias Ijape blamed Miriung for a BRA attack on PNG soldiers and called for his resignation as Premier.

== Assassination ==
On 5 October 1996, Miriung travelled from the government's base at Buka to visit his family at Siwai. A week later, on 12 October, Miriung was assassinated at the age of 55 while having dinner with his family in his wife's village of Kapana. He was reported to have been killed at close range by at least two assassins, with an autopsy finding six wounds in his back from automatic gunfire and one major wound from a shotgun blast. Miriung's killing was condemned by Chan and Australian foreign minister Alexander Downer and numerous other figures. His assassination removed a key figure from the peace process: United Press International wrote at the time that he was "seen by many to offer the greatests hope for peace on the strife-torn island", while peace process worker Alan Weeks later wrote that Miriung "could have been the Nelson Mandela of Bougainville.

== Investigations into responsibility ==
The Papua New Guinea Defence Force and the BRA initially traded allegations of responsibility for the killing. A Commission of Inquiry was held under retired Sri Lankan judge Thiruvukkarasu Suntheralingam, which found in December 1996 that the murder was committed by several members of the PNGDF in conjunction with their allies the Siwai Resistance. Suntheralingam requested that police investigate further and prosecute six people, but this did not occur. Sections of the report were released publicly, but the full report, including the specific identities of Miriung's alleged killers, were never released, and Miriung's family never received a copy. The assassination remained a long-simmering issue during the Bougainville peace process, which inhibited progress at various times. In November 2019, with the 2019 Bougainville independence referendum drawing international attention to Bougainville, Miriung's family called for the release of the full report and the naming of those responsible. Sam Akoitai, the member for Central Bougainville in the National Parliament of Papua New Guinea, raised the issue in parliament, and Prime Minister James Marape pledged to further investigate the issue. In December 2019, Miriung's eldest son Justin stated that the family believes that some figures from the national government were involved in his murder.
