= 2008 Bougainvillean presidential election =

Presidential elections were held in Bougainville (an autonomous region of Papua New Guinea) from November 30 to December 18, 2008. Voters elected the new President of the Autonomous Region of Bougainville, following the death of President Joseph Kabui while in office, on June 7.

The potential resumption of controversial mining activities, which were at the root of Bougainville's civil war in the 1990s, was reportedly a key issue in this election.

There were twelve candidates at the by-election: Nick Peniai, Edward Okuwau, Gerard Sinato, Sam Kauona, Clarence Cozxiune, James Tanis, Ruben Siara, Sam Akoitai, Sylvester Niu, Joel Banam, Raymond Hakena and Patrick Leslie. The two favourites had been considered to be Papua New Guinea's former mining minister Akoitai and former rebel leader Kauona. In total, 14 candidates stood in the election. Sinato represented Kabui's Bougainville People's Congress, while Hakena represented the New Bougainville Party.

With 22,956 votes being cast, the election was won by James Tanis, a former Bougainville Revolutionary Army separatist and the third-place candidate in the 2005 election, with 11,112 votes. Akoitai finished second with 9,217 votes. Tanis was sworn in on 6 January 2009.
