= Rotokas Record =

2001 weapons surrender agreement in Papua New Guinea

The Rotokas Record was a weapons surrender agreement involving the Bougainville Resistance Force and the Bougainville Revolutionary Army and the Papua New Guinean government. It was signed on May 3, 2001.

The weapons surrender agreement was part of a larger peace process between Papua New Guinea and Bougainville after Bougainville attempted to secede from Papua New Guinea.
