= Buin Rural LLG =

Local-level government in Papua New Guinea

- Country: Papua New Guinea
- Province: Autonomous Region of Bougainville

Population (2011 census)
  - Total: 35,327
- Time zone: UTC+10 (AEST)

Buin Rural LLG is a local-level government (LLG) of the Autonomous Region of Bougainville, Papua New Guinea.

== Wards ==
- 01. Baubake
- 02. Lugakei
- 03. Konnou
- 04. Makis
- 05. Lenoke
- 06. Wisai
