= 2010 Bougainvillean general election =

General elections were held in the Autonomous Region of Bougainville in Papua New Guinea from 6 to 24 May 2010.

In the presidential election John Momis, the former Governor of Bougainville and framer of the Papua New Guinean constitution, defeated incumbent President James Tanis and five other challengers in the election.

== Background ==
Incumbent president James Tanis, a former separatist leader in the Bougainville Revolutionary Army, had been elected president in an early 2008 presidential by-election following the unexpected death of former president Joseph Kabui in June 2008. Kabui's death forced the by-election just 18 months before the scheduled presidential election in 2010. Tanis was elected to serve as president for the remainder of Kabui's term. He sought re-election in 2010.

Voter rolls were updated for the 2010 general election. 134,279 voters were registered to vote in the election. According to the updated voter lists, North Bougainville District had the highest number of eligible voters, with 57,979 registered voters; followed by 48,652 voters in South Bougainville District and 27,648 voters in Central Bougainville District.

South Bougainville remains the most politically unstable region of the island, with fourteen separate, armed militias operating in the area. Violence in southern Bougainville had decreased during James Tanis' presidency.

== Presidential candidates ==
Seven candidates contested the election, including incumbent James Tanis. The number was down significantly from the fourteen candidates who ran during the 2008 presidential by-election.

- Robert Atsir – resident of North Bougainville
- Martin Miriori – resident of Central Bougainville Miriori is the older brother of former Bougainville President Joseph Kabui, who died in 2008. He was a former international spokesperson for the Bougainville separatist movement.
- John Momis – resident of South Bougainville and a member of the New Bougainville Party. Momis, a former Roman Catholic priest, served as the now defunct Governor of Bougainville and Papua New Guinea's ambassador to the People's Republic of China. Momis is also one of the authors of the Papua New Guinea national constitution.
- Sylvester Niu – resident of North Bougainville
- Reuben Siara – resident of Central Bougainville Siara is a lawyer by profession.
- James Tanis – resident of Central Bougainville. Tanis, the incumbent president of Bougainville first elected in 2008, was running for re-election to a full term. He was a former fighter and leader within the Bougainville Revolutionary Army during the civil war.
- Magdalene Toroansi – resident of Central Bougainville. Toroansi was the only female candidate in the 2010 presidential election. She gave up her seat in the Autonomous Region of Bougainville parliament, a seat which had been specifically reserved for a woman, to contest the presidential election. Toroansi had represented the Central Kieta constituency of Central Bougainville.

== Results ==
=== President ===
Early election returns predicted a tight race between the two frontrunners, President James Tanis and challenger John Momis. Both candidates initially led in early counting.

The earliest results, which were reported from Central Bougainville, gave President Tanis a clear lead over the other candidates, with Tanis' 1405 votes leading all other candidates, including Reuben Siara, who placed second with 495 votes. However, as more areas of the island were reported, Momis was able to significantly cut into Tannis lead. On May 27, Tanis lead Momis by just 268 votes, with 5,226 votes to Momis' 4,958. By June 2, Momis had overtaken Tanis and the other candidates, leading his nearest rival, President James Tanis, by more than 8,000 votes.

On 8 June at 14:30 Momis was declared the winner and president-elect of Bougainville. Momis won 43,047 votes, or 52.35% of the total votes cast in the election. The incumbent, President James Tanis, earned an estimated 17,205 votes. Momis won the popular vote in both South Bougainville and Tanis' home region of Central Bougainville.

Candidate	Votes	%
John Momis	43,047	52.35
James Tanis	17,205	
Reuben Siara		
Martin Miriori		
Robert Atsir		
Magdalene Toroansi		
Sylvester Niu		
Total		
Source: Bougainville News Book 2010

=== House of Representatives ===
More than three-quarters of the incumbent members of the House of Representatives were defeated in their re-election bids.

== Reactions ==
In his victory speech, Momis thanked Tanis for his service and pledged to continue successful programs by the Tanis government. Momis stated that his administration would focus on good governance, the disposal of ordnance and weapons, education and health. He also pledged "zero tolerance approach" to corruption, stated that less than 25% of incumbent members of the House of Representatives had been re-elected to office due to voter disgust with corruption and mismanagement in government.

President James Tanis thanked Bougainvillean voters and pledged to support President-elect Momis during the transition of government.

== Government formation ==
Momis was sworn into office as President of the Autonomous Region of Bougainville on June 10, 2010, at the Parliament house. Bougainville’s Chief Magistrate, Peter Toliken, administered the oath of office. Momis will hold a 5-year term.

On the day he was sworn in, President Momis appointed Patrick Nisira, the outgoing Works Minister in the Tanis administration and one of the few politicians to have retained his seat in the general election, as his Vice President of the Autonomous Region of Bougainville. Nisira represents the Halia constituency.

The new government, with Momis' full cabinet, was to be sworn in on Tuesday, June 15, 2010.

Analysts view Momis as more in favor of continued autonomy and continued integration with Papua New Guinea, while Momis' predecessor, James Tanis, supported full independence. During the presidential campaign, Tanis had stated, "There has been a growing opinion that the bottom line is independence. If this mine (Panguna) funded PNG independence in 1975, then it can fund Bougainville autonomy and independence."
