= Patrick Nisira =

Papua New Guinea politician

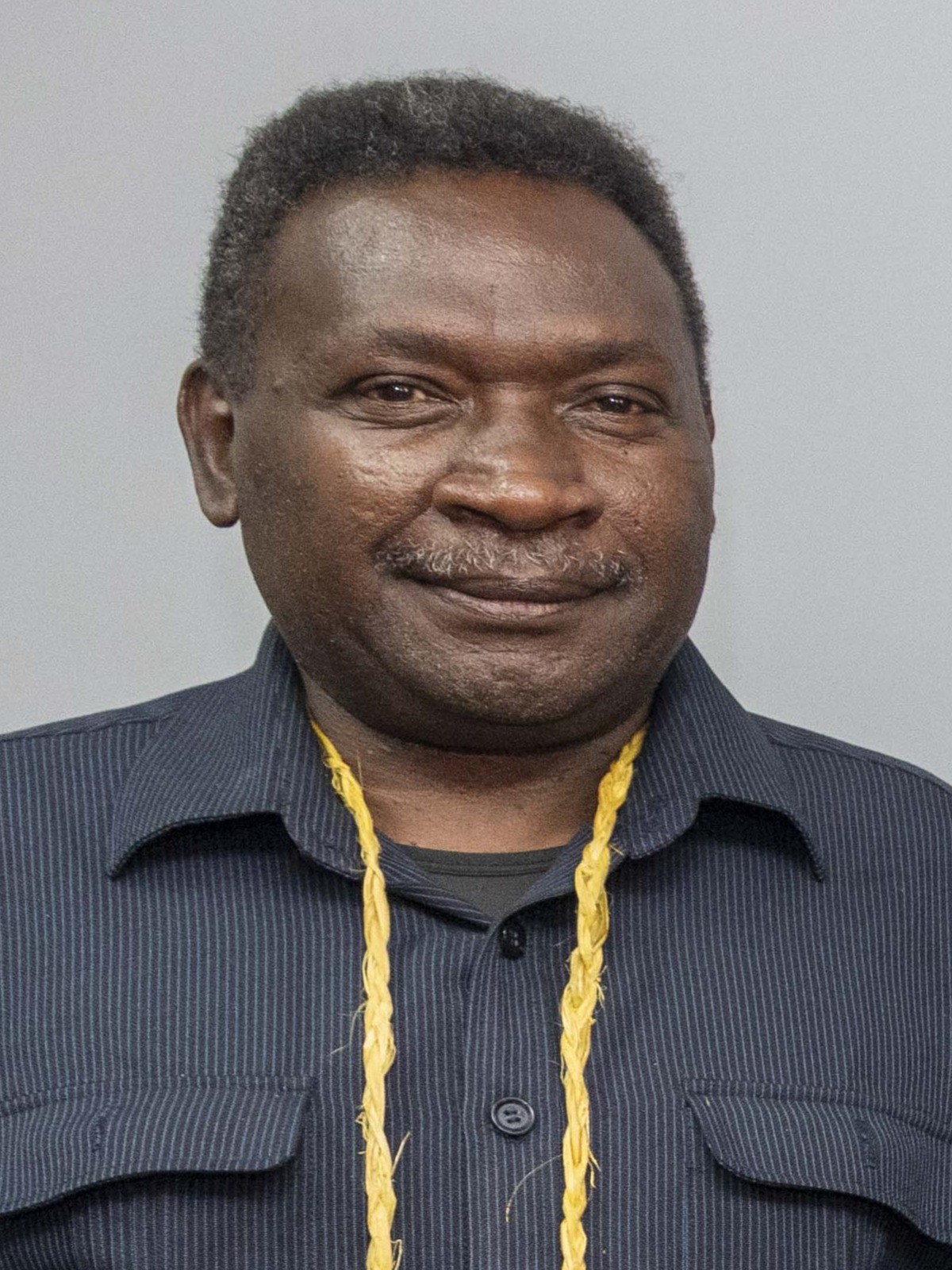

Vice-President of the Autonomous Region of Bougainville
- In office 25 September 2020 – 25 October 2025
- President: Ishmael Toroama
- Preceded by: Raymond Masono
- Succeeded by: Ezekiel Massat
- In office 10 June 2010 – 22 February 2017
- President: John Momis
- Preceded by: Ezekiel Massat
- Succeeded by: Raymond Masono

Minister of Economic Development
- Incumbent
- Assumed office 2 October 2020
- President: Ishmael Toroama

Member of the Bougainville House of Representatives
- Incumbent
- Assumed office 2005
- Constituency: Halia

Personal details
- Born: 1972 (age 53–54) Territory of New Guinea
- Party: Independent

Patrick Nisira (born 1972) is a Bougainvillean politician.

== Political career ==
He was Vice President of the Autonomous Region of Bougainville under President John Momis from 10 June 2010 to 22 February 2017. He was reappointed as vice president by Ishmael Toroama on 25 September 2020.

Nisira represents the Halia constituency in North Bougainville as an independent. He previously served as the Works Minister in the government of former President James Tanis. Tanis was defeated for re-election by John Momis in the 2010 presidential election. Nisira was one of the few members of Tanis' cabinet to win re-election in the simultaneous general election, defeating challenger Damian Kora with 1,764 votes to Kora's 512 votes.

Newly elected President John Momis appointed Nisira as his vice-president on 10 June 2010—the same date as his presidential inauguration. Nisira served a five-year term as vice-president and was appointed to a second term in 2015. Nisira was also appointed as Health Minister within Momis's cabinet on 23 June 2010.

Nisira resigned the Vice-Presidency in February 2017 in order to contest the 2017 Papua New Guinean national election.

In 2018, Nisira was appointed a Commissioner of the Bougainville Referendum Commission. In that role, he is working as part of the commission to ensure that the referendum on Bougainville's long term political future is conducted freely and fairly. He is one of five Commissioners, that includes former Irish Prime Minister Bertie Ahern as chair.

On 2 October 2020 Nisira was appointed Minister of Economic Development in the cabinet of Ishmael Toroama.
