= Autonomous Bougainville Government =

Government of the Autonomous Region of Bougainville, Papua New Guinea

The Autonomous Bougainville Government (ABG; Tok Pisin: Otonomos Bogenvil Gavman) is the government of the Autonomous Region of Bougainville, Papua New Guinea.

== Structure ==
The Constitution of Bougainville specifies that the Autonomous Bougainville Government shall consist of three branches:

- Executive – The President of the Autonomous Region of Bougainville, who chairs the Bougainville Executive Council.
- Legislative – The Bougainville House of Representatives (39 elected members and 2 ex officio members).
- Judicial – The newly established Bougainville Courts, Bougainville Community Courts & Bougainville High Court (yet to be established).

== History ==
The government was established in 2000 following a peace agreement between the government of Papua New Guinea and the Bougainville Revolutionary Army (BRA), a guerrilla movement. Elections for the first autonomous government were held in May and June 2005; Joseph Kabui was elected president, with Joseph Watawi selected by the House of Representatives as vice-president.

A non-binding referendum for independence from Papua New Guinea was held in December 2019. This was in accordance with the terms of the Bougainville Peace Agreement, which requires such a referendum to be held by 2020. There were concerns that the referendum could result in violence due to unresolved tensions from the Bougainville conflict. In this referendum, 98% of voters voted in favour of independence.

Constitutional amendments proposed in February 2020, would see the Autonomous Bougainville Government renamed as the "Bougainville Constitutional Transitional Government". It is aimed that the government will be governing an independent Republic of Bougainville, separate from the Monarchy of Papua New Guinea, in 2027 following an agreement with the PNG government. In 2025, the Autonomous Bougainville Government converted the legislature into a constituent assembly in preparation for independence.
