= Ezekiel Massat =

Papua New Guinea politician

Vice-President of the Autonomous Region of Bougainville
- Incumbent
- Assumed office 21 October 2025
- President: Ishmael Toroama
- Preceded by: Patrick Nisira
- In office January 19, 2009 – June 10, 2010
- President: James Tanis
- Preceded by: John Tabinaman
- Succeeded by: Patrick Nisira

Attorney General
- Incumbent
- Assumed office 2 October 2020
- President: Ishmael Toroama

Minister of Justice
- Incumbent
- Assumed office 2 October 2020

Minister of Post-Referendum Dialogue
- Incumbent
- Assumed office 2 October 2020

Member of the Bougainville House of Representatives
- Incumbent
- Assumed office 2005
- Constituency: Tonsu

Personal details
- Party: Bougainville People's Congress

Ezekiel Massat is a Bougainvillean lawyer and politician. Massat was appointed the Vice President of the Autonomous Region of Bougainville by President James Tanis on January 19, 2009. Bougainville is an autonomous region within Papua New Guinea.

== Career ==
Massat is a lawyer who has previously served as Bougainville's police minister. He represents the Tonu constituency on Buka Island in North Bougainville.

President James Tanis appointed Massat as vice president following pressure by the Central and North Bougainville regions for more inclusion in the Bougainvillaen government. Massat was sworn in as vice president in a ceremony at the Bougainville House of Representatives on the afternoon of January 19, 2009, by senior magistrate Bruce Tasikul. He assumed the vice presidency on the same day as his appointment by Tanis. Massat succeeded John Tabinaman, the former vice president and who had served as the acting president of Bougainville following the death of Joseph Kabui in June 2008.

Massat will also be responsible for justice and law within the Tanis government.

On 2 October 2020 Massat was appointed Attorney General and Minister of Justice and Post-Referendum Dialogue in the cabinet of Ishmael Toroama.
