= President of the Autonomous Region of Bougainville =

Head of the region within Papua New Guinea

- Emblem of the Autonomous Region of Bougainville

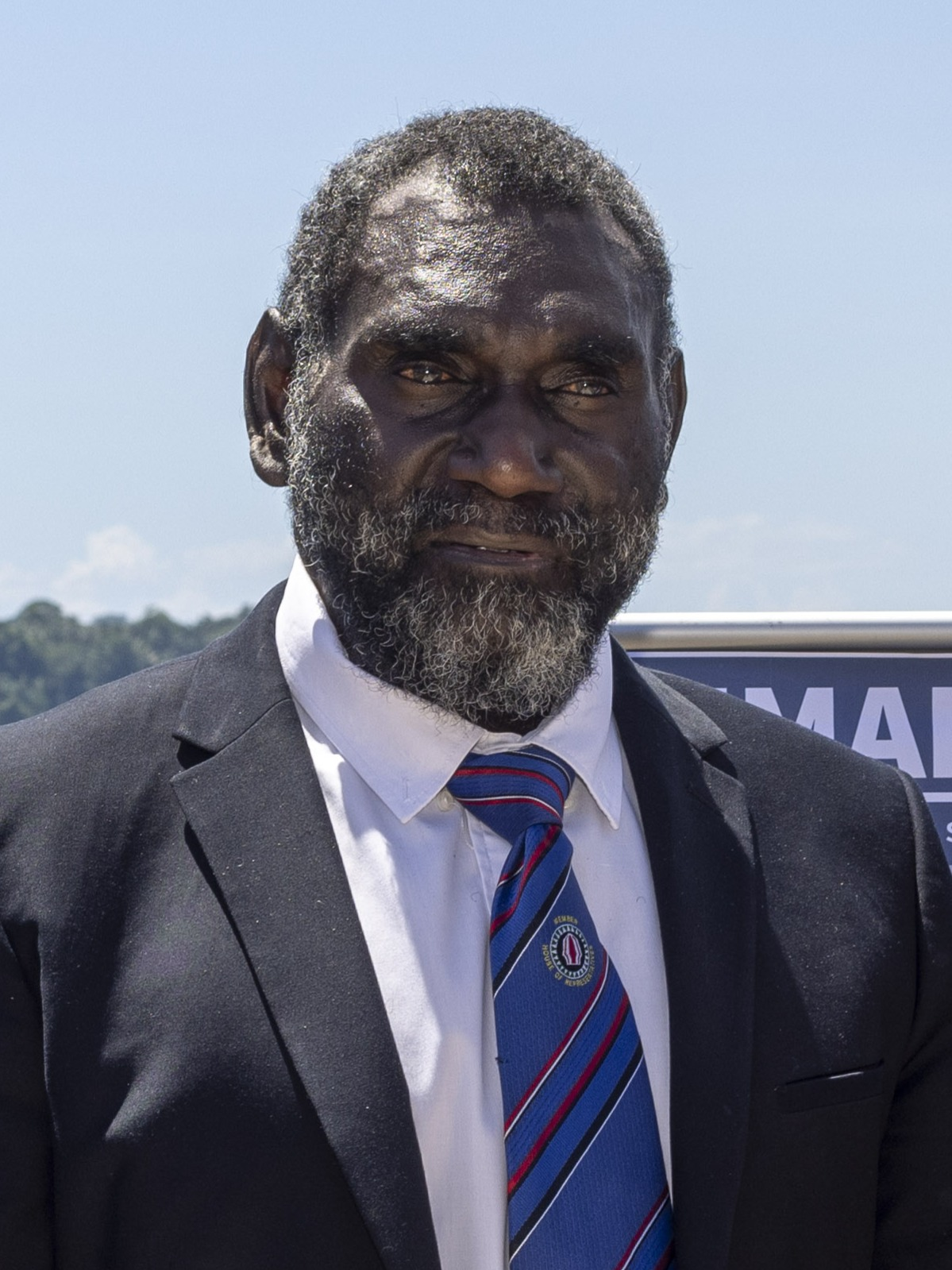
- Incumbent; Ishmael Toroama since 25 September 2020
- Appointer: Direct Election
- Term length: Five years, renewable once
- Inaugural holder: Joseph Kabui
- Formation: 15 June 2005
- Deputy: Vice-President of the Autonomous Region of Bougainville
- Website: President of Bougainville

The President of the Autonomous Region of Bougainville governs the island, which is an autonomous entity within Papua New Guinea.

== List of presidents of the Autonomous Region of Bougainville ==
The first President of Bougainville was Joseph Kabui, who was elected in June 2005, following the 2000 peace agreement which ended the Bougainville War. Kabui died of an apparent heart attack on 7 June 2008, and Vice-President John Tabinaman took over as Acting President until a new election was held.

No.	President	Took office	Left office	Tenure	Party	Election	Vice-President
1	Joseph Kabui (1954–2008)	15 June 2005	7 June 2008 (Note: Died in office.)	2 years, 358 days	Bougainville People's Congress	2005	Joseph Watawi (until 2007)
1	Joseph Kabui (1954–2008)	15 June 2005	7 June 2008	2 years, 358 days	Bougainville People's Congress	2005	John Tabinaman (from 2007)
–	John Tabinaman (c. 1952–2021); Acting	7 June 2008	6 January 2009	213 days	Unknown	–	Mathias Salas
2	James Tanis (born 1965?)	6 January 2009	10 June 2010	1 year, 155 days	Bougainville Independence Movement	2008	Ezekiel Massat
3	John Momis (born 1942)	10 June 2010	25 September 2020	10 years, 107 days	New Bougainville Party	2010	Patrick Nisira (until 2017)
3	John Momis (born 1942)	10 June 2010	25 September 2020	10 years, 107 days	New Bougainville Party	2015	Patrick Nisira (until 2017)
3	John Momis (born 1942)	10 June 2010	25 September 2020	10 years, 107 days	New Bougainville Party	2015	Raymond Masono (from 2017)
4	Ishmael Toroama (born 1968)	25 September 2020	Incumbent	6 years, 42 days	Bougainville People's Alliance Party	2020	Patrick Nisira (until 2025)
4	Ishmael Toroama (born 1968)	25 September 2020	Incumbent	6 years, 42 days	Bougainville People's Alliance Party	2025	Ezekiel Massat (since 2025)

== Previous regional leaders ==
Bougainville has been headed by several different types of administration: a decentralised administration headed by a Premier (as North Solomons Province from 1975 to 1990), an appointed administrator during the height of the Bougainville Civil War (from 1990 to 1995), a Premier heading the Bougainville Transitional Government (from 1995 to 1998), the co-chairmen of the Bougainville Constituent Assembly (1999), a Governor heading a provincial government as in other parts of Papua New Guinea (2000 to 2005) and the Autonomous Bougainville Government (since 2005).

=== President of the secessionist Republic of North Solomons (1975) ===
Premier	Term
Alexis Sarei	1975

=== Premiers (1975–1990) ===
Premier	Term
Alexis Sarei	1975–1980
Leo Hannett	1980–1984
Alexis Sarei	1984–1987
Joseph Kabui	1987–1990

=== Administrators (1990–1995) ===
Premier	Term
Sam Tulo	1990–1995

=== Premiers (1995–1998) ===
Premier	Term
Theodore Miriung	1995–1996
Gerard Sinato	1996–1998

=== Bougainville Constituent Assembly Co-chairmen (1999) ===
Premier	Term
Gerard Sinato and Joseph Kabui	January 1999 – December 1999

=== Governors (1999–2005) ===
Governor	Term
John Momis	1999–2005
