= James Tanis =

Papua New Guinean politician

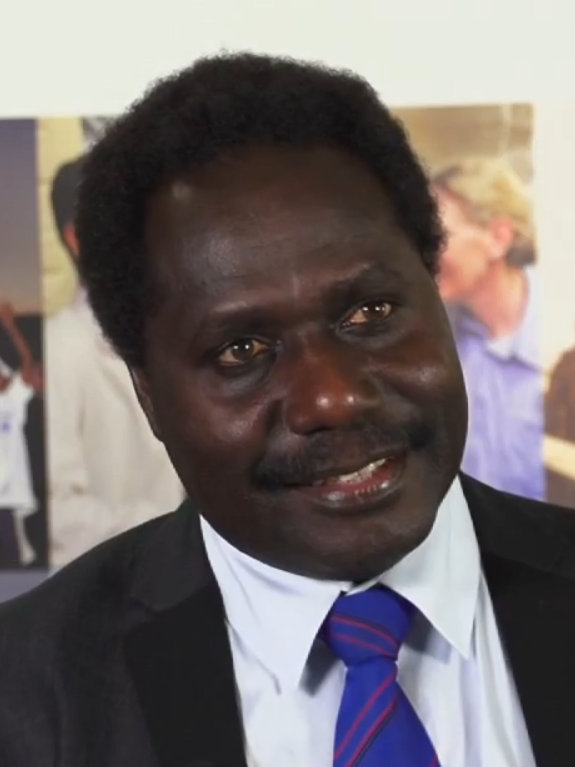
- Tanis in 2012

2nd President of the Autonomous Region of Bougainville
- In office 6 January 2009 – 10 June 2010
- Preceded by: John Tabinaman (acting)
- Succeeded by: John Momis

Personal details
- Born: 1965? Panam Village, Lamane
- Party: Bougainville People's Congress

James Tanis (born 1965?) is a politician in Papua New Guinea who was elected President of the Autonomous Region of Bougainville in 2008 following the death of Joseph Kabui while in office, serving the remainder of the term from 2009 to 2010. He was previously the Vice President of the Bougainville People's Congress.

== Early life ==
Tanis was raised in Panam Village in Lamane, on the border of South and Central Bougainville.

The Bougainville independence movement began in the 1980s after local landowners closed the Panguna copper mine. In 1989, Bougainville Revolutionary Army (BRA) leaders proclaimed Bougainville independent from Papua New Guinea and established an interim government. A civil war consumed the island for the next decade as the BRA fought the Papua New Guinea military. Tanis is a former guerrilla and commander in the BRA. Tanis has been described as having been "once closely linked with the late separatist leader, Francis Ona." He later became "a key player in forging the 2001 peace agreement" following the Bougainvillean civil war. However, Bougainville has been plagued by infighting and tensions from years of conflict.

== Presidency ==
Tanis' predecessor, John Tabinaman, took over as Acting President after Joseph Kabui died in office of a heart attack in June 2008. This led to a special presidential election in November and December 2008. There were 14 candidates; Tanis was declared winner with a margin of 13,547 votes over second-runner Sam Akoitai. The election had a poor voter turnout which was reportedly contributed to by heavily armed road blocks, ongoing local disputes, and complaints by many Bougainvilleans that their names were not on election rolls. Tanis was sworn in on 6 January 2009.

Experts have said that the election of the 43-year-old Tanis "represents a generational change" in Bougainville's political leadership.

Tanis was inaugurated as Bougainville's second elected president in a colorful swearing-in ceremony on 6 January 2009, as Bougainvilleans in traditional costumes travelled from all corners of the island to attend the ceremony in Arawa, Central Bougainville. The ceremony lasted most of the day and included indigenous music and dance. Before the inauguration, Tanis undertook a trip through some twenty fast flowing rivers and creeks before arriving safely in Arawa for the ceremony.

Tanis served an interim term, completing Kabui's scheduled term before the presidential election of 2010. He said his focus would be on promoting unity in the aftermath of the long civil war. Tanis said he is "not looking at achieving much" during his 20-month term in office, but will ensure peace prevails through reconciliation.

Tanis appointed Ezekiel Massat as Vice President on 19 January 2009. He was defeated by John Momis in 2010.

== Post-presidency ==
Since 2014 Tanis has been Secretary for Peace in the Bougainville Administration. In 2018 he resigned, but two days later retracted his resignation saying he had resolved his differences with President John Momis.

In late 2018 Tanis was suspended on allegations of misconduct.

In March 2019 Tanis was dismissed from office, having been found guilty by an independent Board of Inquiry of gross misconduct.

Despite this, Tanis is quoted by media as saying he had already been appointed as a special envoy of President John Momis on Peace. This is despite Momis being Chairman of the same Committee that dismissed Tanis from office.

Tanis remains a controversial figure in Bougainville politics and is widely tipped to run for election as president in 2020 when current President John Momis must stand down.

Preceded by John Tabinaman (acting)	President of the Autonomous Region of Bougainville; January 2009 – 10 June 2010	Succeeded by John Momis
