= Bougainville conflict =

1988–1998 armed conflict in Papua New Guinea

Bougainvillean Civil War
- District map of Bougainville (North Solomons)
Date	1 December 1988 – 20 April 1998
Location	Bougainville and the Solomon Islands
Result	Military stalemate: Bougainville Peace Agreement; Establishment of the Autonomous Bougainville Government; Bougainville scheduled to be an independent country around 2027

Belligerents
Papua New Guinea: Buka Liberation Front; Bougainville Resistance Force; Supported by: Australia; Indonesia	Bougainville Interim Government (BIG): Bougainville Revolutionary Army (BRA); Supported by: Solomon Islands; Fiji (alleged)

Commanders and leaders
Julius Chan; Jerry Singirok (WIA); Paias Wingti; Bill Skate; Rabbie Namaliu	Francis Ona; Sam Kauona; Theodore Miriung †; Ishmael Toroama; Joseph Kabui

Strength
c. 800 soldiers; 150 police; Several thousand resistance fighters; 4 UH-1 Iroquois helicopters; 4 Pacific-class patrol boats	c. 2,000

Casualties and losses
300+ PNGDF soldiers killed; Several thousand wounded	1,000–2,000 fighters killed
- Estimates vary between 15,000 and 20,000 Bougainvilleans dead

The Bougainville conflict, also known as the Bougainvillean Civil War, the Solomon Civil War or the Civil War of the North Solomons was a multi-layered armed conflict fought from 1988 to 1998 in the North Solomons Province of Papua New Guinea between the governments of Papua New Guinea, supported by Australia and Indonesia and the secessionist forces of the Bougainville Revolutionary Army (BRA), the rest of the Solomon Islands and allegedly Fiji, and between the BRA and other armed groups on Bougainville. The conflict was described by Bougainvillean President John Momis as the largest conflict in Oceania since the end of World War II in 1945, with an estimated 15,000–20,000 Bougainvilleans dead, although some estimates place the toll as low as between 1,000 and 2,000.

Hostilities concluded under the Bougainville Peace Agreement in 1998. The national (PNG) government agreed to the founding of the Autonomous Bougainville Government and to certain rights and authorities that the autonomous government would have over what became known as Bougainville Province, which includes outlying small islands in addition to Bougainville Island itself.

== Background ==
Bougainville is an autonomous region of Papua New Guinea, consisting of the main islands of Bougainville and Buka and numerous smaller islands. Geographically they form part of the Solomon Islands archipelago, but are politically separate from the independent country of Solomon Islands. Bougainville was part of German New Guinea, a protectorate of Imperial Germany, from the late 1800s until it was occupied by Australia after the outbreak of World War I in 1914. Australia was assigned a League of Nations mandate over German New Guinea in the Treaty of Versailles in 1919. Under Australian rule, lode gold was first discovered on Bougainville in 1930. The discovery of vast copper ore deposits in the Crown Prince Range on Bougainville island during the 1960s led to the establishment of the huge Panguna mine by the Australian company Conzinc Rio Tinto. In 1972, the Panguna mine began production under the management of Bougainville Copper, with the government of Papua New Guinea as a 20% shareholder. At the time, the Panguna mine was the largest open cut mine in the world and produced more than 45% of Papua New Guinea's export revenue, making it vitally important to the national economy.

Conflict began to emerge in Bougainville from the start of mining operations at Panguna as the mine recruited thousands of migrant workers to the island. Most were Papua New Guineans from the mainland, whom the Bougainvilleans referred to as "red-skins" because of their skin colour. By contrast, most native people of the island identified as "black." Many "white-skins", mostly Australian nationals, also came to work at the mine. The Bougainvilleans wanted neither the migrants nor immigrants on their land, especially the "red-skins" who they resented because of cultural differences between the groups. Many of the local landowners were opposed to the mine because it attracted an influx of immigrant workers, the adverse environmental effects, and that most of the mine's profits left the island. Prior to Papua New Guinea's independence in 1975, Bougainville Island had attempted to secede from Papua New Guinea until representatives reached an agreement with the Australian administration for further decentralization, which satisfied concerns at the time.

== Secessionist conflict ==
By late 1988, tensions over the mine led to local violence in Bougainville. The government deployed the Royal Papua New Guinea Constabulary (RPNGC) Mobile Squads and elements of the Papua New Guinea Defence Force (PNGDF). Although initially restricted to the area around the mine site, the conflict subsequently intensified. Both sides reported abuses against the native population during fighting between government forces and the rebels of the Bougainville Revolutionary Army (BRA), and the conflict developed into a general separatist insurgency. The mine company closed the mine, and many non-Bougainvilleans left the island. Fighting continued for a year, during which widespread human rights violations were alleged to have occurred, including the burning of many villages. However, in early 1990 Papua New Guinea withdrew, leaving Bougainville in the control of the BRA. Despite agreeing to disarm and negotiate, Francis Ona, the leader of the BRA, unilaterally declared independence in May 1990.

The PNG government subsequently imposed a blockade on Bougainville. It was enforced using UH-1 Iroquois helicopters and Pacific-class patrol boats that had been supplied to PNG as aid by the Australian government in the late-1980s as part of a defence co-operation program underway since independence. Other Australian support, as part of its capacity-building effort, included funding for the PNGDF, provision of arms and ammunition, logistics, training, and some specialist and technical advisors and personnel. Similar assistance was also provided to the police. (Note: During this period Australian Defence Force (ADF) loan personnel filled a number of key positions in the PNGDF on a regular basis, and as a result they were often at least indirectly involved in supporting most PNGDF operations, including those on Bougainville. Five members of the ADF on loan or exchange with the PNGDF are reported to have visited Bougainville during the crisis. Their duties were restricted to the provision of technical advice.) The helicopters had been provided by Australia without weapons, and on the provision that they would not be used for combat. The PNGDF subsequently fitted machine guns in contravention of the agreement and later used them as gunships. (Note: The helicopters were reported to have been maintained and operated by a private company contracted to the PNGDF at the time, and were flown by Australian and New Zealand civilian pilots.) The blockade remained in effect until the ceasefire in 1994 (although it was informally continued for some parts of Bougainville until 1997).

Ona subsequently set up the Bougainville Interim Government (BIG), appointing himself president. The former premier of the provincial government, Joseph Kabui, was appointed vice-president. The military commander of the BRA was Sam Kauona, a former PNGDF officer. Yet the BIG had little power, and the island began to descend into disarray. The command structure established by the BRA seldom had any real control over the various groups throughout the island that claimed to be part of the BRA. A number of raskol (criminal) gangs that were affiliated with the BRA, equipped largely with weapons salvaged from the fighting in World War II, terrorized villages, engaging in murder, rape and pillage. Bougainville split into several factions, as the conflict took on ethnic and separatist characteristics.

The divisions in the conflict were largely drawn along clan lines. There were 70–80 minor tribal conflicts for BIG to deal with in addition to the blockade. As the BIG/BRA was dominated by the Nasioi clan, other islanders were suspicious of its goals, especially in north Bougainville. On the island of Buka, north of Bougainville, a local militia was formed which succeeded in driving out the BRA in September, with the help of Papuan troops. By the end of 1990, the PNGDF national forces controlled Buka, while the BRA controlled the remainder of Bougainville. Early attempts at resolving the conflict resulted in agreements being signed in 1990 and 1991; however, neither side honoured their terms. Meanwhile, the BRA leadership of Ona and Kauona fell out with some of the political leaders, such as Kabui. Several other pro-government village militias, which together became known as the resistance and were armed by the PNGDF, forced the BRA out of their areas. During 1991–92, the PNGDF gradually returned to Bougainville, taking control of the north and southwest of the main island.

Papua New Guinea's policy towards Bougainville hardened after the defeat of the incumbent government at the 1992 elections. New prime minister Paias Wingti took a considerably more hardline stance. In 1992–93, the PNGDF launched a number of unauthorised cross-border raids into the Solomon Islands in pursuit of supporters of the BRA. Relations with the Solomon Islands deteriorated, and on one occasion PNG forces clashed with Solomon Island police, exchanging fire. On another the PNGDF troops landed on the island of Oema. The PNGDF, in alliance with the resistance, reoccupied Arawa, the provincial capital, in February 1993. Papuan Foreign Minister Sir Julius Chan attempted to gather a peacekeeping force from the nations of the Pacific, but Wingti quashed the idea. He subsequently ordered the army to retake the Panguna mine, and was initially successful. His government was short-lived, and in August 1994 was replaced as prime minister by Julius Chan. The assault on Panguna subsequently failed. The PNGDF increasingly sustained losses at the hands of the insurgents in the interior of the island, where the jungle limited the visibility and effectiveness of its patrols.

Chan announced his intention to find a peaceful solution to the conflict, arranging a ceasefire at a meeting with Kauona in the Solomon Islands in September. They agreed to hold a peace conference in Arawa that October, with security provided by an Australian-led South Pacific Peacekeeping Force. However, the BIG leaders boycotted the conference, claiming that their safety could not be guaranteed. In the absence of Ona, Kabui and Kauona emerged as more moderate BRA leaders. Chan's government subsequently entered into negotiations with a group of chiefs from the Nasioi clan, headed by Theodore Miriung, a former lawyer for the Panguna Landowners Association. This resulted in the establishment of a Bougainville Transitional Government in April 1995, with its capital in Buka. Miriung was named as the Premier of a compromise government but ultimately was "unable to bridge the gap between hardliners on both sides".

Meanwhile, Chan was beginning to get frustrated at the lack of progress. Following a round of negotiations in Cairns, Australia, in September and December 1995, between the BRA, BTG and the PNG government, in January 1996 the BRA/BIG representatives, including Kabui, were fired on by PNGDF forces after returning to Bougainville. Later, the home of the BIG's representative in the Solomon Islands, Martin Mirori, was firebombed. The BRA subsequently undertook retaliatory action in northern Bougainville and on Buka. Chan decided to abandon attempts at peace, and on 21 March 1996, approved the lifting of the ceasefire on Bougainville. In an address to the nation, he subsequently resolved to achieve a military solution.

== Sandline affair ==
With the government of Australia declining to provide direct military support and advocating a political solution to the conflict, Chan sought alternatives. The Sandline affair began in March 1996, when the government of Papua New Guinea attempted to hire mercenaries from Sandline International, a London-based private military company, that in turn employed the South African military contractor Executive Outcomes. As negotiations with Sandline continued, in July the PNGDF launched a new offensive on Bougainville. The attack failed, suffering from poor logistical planning, a lack of intelligence on BRA locations and mounting casualties.

In September, BRA militants attacked a PNG army camp at Kangu Beach with the help of members of a local militia group, killing twelve PNGDF soldiers and taking five hostage. The incident was the largest single loss in an operation for the PNGDF during the conflict. The following month, Theodore Miriung was assassinated. A subsequent independent investigation implicated members of the PNGDF and the resistance militias. Discipline and morale was rapidly deteriorating within the ranks of the PNG military, and they were withdrawn in August after the offensive ended in a stalemate. By this time the PNGDF, with assistance of the Bougainville Resistance Forces, was in "reasonable" control of approximately 40% of the island, yet they remained vulnerable to guerilla attacks with the BRA establishing an ascendency over government forces.

Chan decided that his best chance to recapture the Panguna mine was with the Sandline mercenaries, and a contract was signed in January 1997. News of his intention to hire mercenaries was leaked to the Australian press and international condemnation followed. Although initially supportive, the commander of the PNGDF, Jerry Singirok, then opposed the plan, and ordered all the mercenaries to be detained on arrival. In the resulting saga, Papua New Guinea came close to a military coup, with the parliament surrounded by demonstrators and many military personnel. The Australian government placed pressure on PNG to terminate the contract with Sandline, and intercepted the heavy equipment that was being flown in for the mercenaries. Chan resigned and the mercenaries were removed from Papua New Guinean territory.

The conflict continued until 1997. There were approximately 800 PNGDF and 150 "riot squad" personnel deployed on the island by this time, while the BRF probably had around 1,500 men. These men were armed by the PNGDF and operated mostly in a "home guard" role, with only a small number involved in patrolling with the PNGDF or in directly involved in the fighting. BRA strength was estimated at 2,000 men armed with around 500 modern weapons (mostly captured or bought from PNGDF or "riot squad" personnel) and several thousand World War II vintage or homemade weapons.

== Ceasefire and aftermath ==
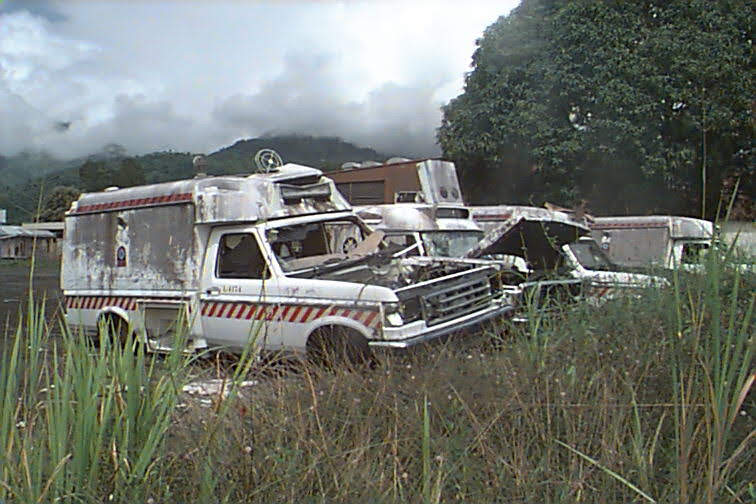
Ambulances in Arawa, 1998, destroyed in conflict.

The impetus for peace was the election of Prime Minister Bill Skate, who had previously opposed a military solution. In mid-1997, talks were held in Honiara and Burnham in New Zealand resulting in a truce, as well as agreement to de-militarize the island. An unarmed Truce Monitoring Group (TMG) led by New Zealand and supported by Australia, Fiji and Vanuatu was subsequently deployed. Since then a ceasefire has largely held on the island. Breaking with Ona, Kauona and Kabui entered into peace talks with the Skate government in Christchurch, New Zealand, which culminated in the signing of the Lincoln Agreement in January 1998. Under the terms of the agreement, PNG began to withdraw its soldiers from the island, and steps were taken to disarm the BRA and BRF, while a multinational Peace Monitoring Group (PMG) under Australian leadership was deployed, replacing the TMG. Legislation to establish a Bougainville Reconciliation Government failed to win approval in the PNG Parliament in December 1998.

A Bougainville provincial government of the same status as the other eighteen provinces of Papua New Guinea, with John Momis as Governor, was established in January 1999. However, this government was suspended after facing opposition from both the BIA/BRA and BTG. Arrangements were made for the creation of a modified government, to be established in two phases: the first being the Bougainville Constituent Assembly and the second being the elections for the Bougainville People's Congress. Elections were held in May, and Kabui was named president. However, the legality of this was contested by Momis, with the support of a number of tribal chiefs and Resistance leaders. In November, a new body, the Bougainville Interim Provincial Government, was established, headed by Momis. Rapprochement between Kauona and Momis led to an agreement through which the two bodies would act in consultation. An organised reconciliation process began at the tribal level in the early 2000s.

A peace agreement was reached in 2001, leading to a roadmap to the creation of an Autonomous Bougainville Government (ABG). Yet Ona refused to play any part in the peace process, and, with a small minority of fighters, broke away from the BRA. Throughout the decade, he continued to resist overtures to participate in the new government, occupying an area around the mine which remained a no-go zone and declaring himself 'king' of Bougainville before dying of malaria in 2005. Elections for the first ABG were held in May and June 2005 with Joseph Kabui elected president.

In March 2006, Dr Shaista Shameem of the United Nations working group on mercenaries asked Fiji and Papua New Guinea for permission to send a team to investigate allegations about the presence of former Fijian soldiers in Bougainville. In 2011 it was reported that former PNG Prime Minister Sir Michael Somare had alleged that Rio Tinto played a role in the civil war by helping finance the actions of the PNG government in Bougainville during the conflict in an attempt to allow the mine to be reopened. The Bougainville government was given control of mining on the island following the passage of the Bougainville Mining Act in March 2015; however, the Panguna mine remains closed.

The war has been described by John Momis, President of the Autonomous Region of Bougainville, as the largest conflict in Oceania since the end of World War II. PNGDF casualties during the fighting were believed to include more than 300 killed. Meanwhile, the Australian government estimated that anywhere between 15,000 and 20,000 people could have died in the Bougainville conflict. However, more conservative estimates put the number of combat deaths as 1,000–2,000. Other sources estimated that around 10,000 Bougainvilleans died of violence or disease during this period, while over 60,000 Bougainvilleans were living in internally displaced persons' camps by the mid-1990s and thousands more had fled to nearby Solomon Islands.

== Independence referendum ==
A condition of the peace agreement was that a referendum on Bougainville's political status would be held within 20 years, scheduled sometime between 2015 and 2020. In January 2016 the Autonomous Bougainville Government and Government of Papua New Guinea agreed to establish the Bougainville Referendum Commission. The commission was tasked with making preparations for a vote on Bougainville's future political status in 2019. In late November and early December 2019, a non-binding referendum on independence was held with an overwhelming majority voting for independence. In July 2021, an agreement was reached between the governments of Papua New Guinea and Bougainville, in which Bougainville will gain independence during September of 2027 pending approval of the PNG government.

== Cultural depictions ==
The Bougainville conflict was depicted in the 2006 novel Mister Pip, by the New Zealand journalist Lloyd Jones, who had written about the war but had not been able to visit PNG. It was made into a film in 2012, entitled Mr. Pip, starring Hugh Laurie and New Guinean actress Xzannjah Matsi.

== See also ==
- History of Bougainville
- Papua conflict, a similar conflict in Indonesia's West Papua region

== Notes ==
Footnotes

Citations
