= Peace Monitoring Group =

Protection agency for Papua New Guinea

- Active: 1998–2003
- Countries: Australia; New Zealand; Fiji; Vanuatu
- Allegiance: Papua New Guinea
- Type: Multinational peacekeeping force
- Role: Policing
- Size: 230+
- Colors: Yellow

The Peace Monitoring Group (PMG) on Bougainville in Papua New Guinea was brought about by the civil unrest on the island in 1989. The PNG government requested the Australian and New Zealand governments to provide a monitoring group to oversee the cease fire on the island. This group was made up of both civilian and defence personnel from Australia, New Zealand, Fiji and Vanuatu. Both sides of the conflict welcomed the group being on Bougainville. This support remained strong throughout the PMG's deployment. The PMG played a role in facilitating the peace process on 30 April 1998 and took over from the New Zealand Truce Monitoring Group which then departed.

The Bougainville Peace Agreement decreed that all personnel should be withdrawn from the island by December 2002. However, the group's presence was extended by the applicable governments and withdrew completely by 23 August 2003. A much smaller Bougainville Transition Team (with orange T-shirts) succeeded the PMG but has now also withdrawn. Australian police and civilian advisers have subsequently served on Bougainville as part of Australian government assistance to Papua New Guinea.

The PMG was unarmed and had no specific legal power (though it did have a mandate under the Lincoln Agreement). It remained definitively neutral at all times. In the early stages of its deployment, it acted primarily as a ceasefire monitoring group and spread information about developments in the peace process. Following the Bougainville Peace Agreement, the PMG focused primarily on facilitating the weapons disposal program, in co-operation with the small UN Observer Mission on Bougainville (UNOMB). There was also some logistical support given to the constitutional consultation and drafting process from 2003.

Support was provided to the group via use of the Loloho wharf on the eastern side of the island by naval vessels from Australia and New Zealand as well as the Kieta airfield by RNZAF C-130 Hercules and four RNZAF Bell UH-1 Iroquois. Additional helicopters were also UH-1 Iroquois supplied by the Australian Army, which were painted bright red for visibility, were utilised to ferry personnel to inland villages inaccessible by foot or vehicle. Later, air mobility was outsourced to Hevilift, which provided two Bell 212 helicopters. PMG Personnel wore bright yellow shirts and hats so that everyone on the island was aware of their presence.

A Logistics Cell at Loloho also provided such services as catering, dental, medical, vehicle transport and communications to the outer lying sites such as Tonu and Wakunui.
