= John Momis =

Papua New Guinean politician (born 1942)

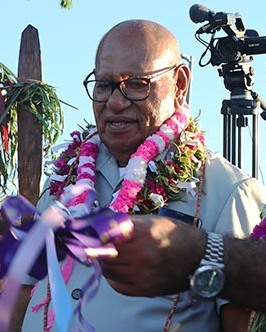
- Momis in 2018

3rd President of Bougainville
- In office 10 June 2010 – 25 September 2020
- Vice President: Patrick Nisira; Raymond Masono
- Preceded by: James Tanis
- Succeeded by: Ishmael Toroama

Governor of Bougainville
- In office 9 December 1999 – 20 April 2005
- Preceded by: Position established
- Succeeded by: Gerard Sinato (Acting)

Personal details
- Born: 3 March 1942 (age 84) Salamaua, New Guinea
- Party: New Bougainville Party
- Spouse: Elizabeth Momis
- Education: Holy Spirit Seminary

John Momis (born 3 March 1942) is a Bougainvillean politician who served as the President of the Autonomous Region of Bougainville in Papua New Guinea between 2010 and 2020.

Momis served as a Catholic priest from 1970 until 1993, becoming active in politics and elected to the assembly in the 1970s. He was a co-writer of the Constitution of Papua New Guinea and worked to establish a secessionist organization in what was then North Solomons Province. After it was confirmed as a province, he returned to national politics. Following the end of the civil war, he was appointed as the governor of Bougainville from 1999 until 2005. He was Papua New Guinea's ambassador to China from 2007 to 2010.

Momis defeated his predecessor James Tanis and five other challengers by a landslide in the 2010 presidential election, in which he was a candidate of the New Bougainville Party. was sworn in as President of Bougainville on 10 June 2010 for a five-year term. He was reelected for a second five year-term in the general elections in May 2015.

== Early life ==
John Momis was born in Salamaua, Morobe Province, in the colonial Territory of New Guinea. Some sources list Momis's birth year as 1942. However, most media sources cite Momis's age as 71 years at the time of his election as President of Bougainville in June 2010, which places his birth year at approximately 1938 or 1939.

Momis attended Buin Primary School in Bougainville and St. Brendan's College, located in Yeppoon, Queensland, Australia. In 1963, Momis entered Holy Spirit Seminary, a Roman Catholic seminary in Madang. He was ordained a Roman Catholic priest in 1970. He remained a Catholic priest until 1993, when he was granted an official dispensation to leave the priesthood. Momis married Elizabeth, and remains a devout Roman Catholic to the present day.

Momis is considered to be a native of South Bougainville, which continued to be unstable politically in the 21st century.

== Political career ==
Momis became active in politics while serving as a Catholic priest. In 1972, he was elected as a member of North Solomons, as Bougainville was known at the time, to colonial Papua New Guinea's first representative assembly, the House of Assembly of Papua and New Guinea. Momis chaired the constitutional committee, which wrote and drafted Papua New Guinea's national constitution, from 1972 until 1975.

Papua New Guinea gained independence from Australia in 1975. Shortly before independence, Momis resigned his seat in the PNG parliament to establish a secessionist organization in North Solomons (Bougainville). However, Momis quickly returned to national Papuan politics after North Solomons was established as a province with a provincial government within Papua New Guinea.

In 1977, Momis was re-elected to the National Parliament of Papua New Guinea as a member from North Solomons. He soon co-founded the new Melanesian Alliance Party with John Kaputin.

Momis initially supported Prime Minister Michael Somare's first coalition government (1975-1980) and was appointed Minister for Decentralization in Somare's government. He remained PNG's Minister for Decentralization until 1982, including two years in the government of Prime Minister Julius Chan. In March 1980, Momis had joined with other members of parliament from North Solomons (Bougainville) to support a successful vote of no confidence in Michael Somare. Chan became Prime Minister after Somare's ouster.

Prime Minister Michael Somare returned to power for a second time in March 1985. Somare appointed Momis as both Deputy Prime Minister and Minister for Public Service.

Momis held a number of positions in the Papua New Guinean parliament over the next decade, including Deputy Leader of the Opposition from 1985 until 1987 and again from 1987 to 1988; Minister for Provincial Affairs from 1988 until 1992 in the government of Prime Minister Rabbie Namaliu; Shadow Minister for Bougainville Affairs in 1992; Shadow Minister for Provincial Affairs in 1993; Deputy Leader of the Opposition in 1994; and Minister of Information and Communication in 1994.

Momis was appointed as the Governor of Bougainville, serving from 9 December 1999 until 20 April 2005. He resigned as governor in 2005 to contest Bougainville's first presidential election that year. He ultimately lost the election to Bougainville's first president, Joseph Kabui.

== President of Bougainville ==
In 2010, Momis resigned his post as Papua New Guinea's ambassador to the People's Republic of China to contest the 2010 presidential election. He was also chosen as the leader of the New Bougainville Party in January 2010.

Momis contested the election against incumbent President James Tanis and five other challengers. Voting for the election began on 7 May 2010 and ended on 24 May 2010.

On Tuesday 8 June 2010 at 2:30 p.m. John Momis was declared the winner and president-elect of Bougainville in a landslide victory over President James Tanis and the other presidential candidates. Momis won 43,047 votes, or 52.35% of the total popular votes cast in the election. His closest challenger, incumbent President James Tanis, received estimated 17,205 votes. Momis won the popular vote in both South Bougainville and Tanis' home region of Central Bougainville.

Momis was sworn into office for a 5-year term as President of the Autonomous Region of Bougainville on 10 June 2010 at the Parliament house. The oath of office was administered by Peter Toliken, Bougainville's Chief Magistrate. On the day of his inauguration, Momis appointed Patrick Nisira as Vice President of the Autonomous Region of Bougainville.

Momis stated that his first priorities in office were to fight political corruption and to arrange disposal of the large number of weapons and unexploded ordnance left over from Bougainville's long war. Analysts view Momis as more in favor of continued autonomy and continued integration with Papua New Guinea, while Momis's predecessor, James Tanis, supported full independence.
