= Bougainville People's Congress =

Pro-independence organisation and later political party

The Bougainville People's Congress was a pro-independence organisation and later political party in the Autonomous Region of Bougainville, Papua New Guinea.

== History ==
It was established in the late 1990s as a representative body during the Bougainville Civil War, and was led by former Premier Joseph Kabui. In the lead-up to autonomy for Bougainville, Kabui opposed the introduction of political parties into the province, stating "the people of Bougainville regard political parties as divisive and given the hate, killings, ill-feelings and divisions that existed during the 10-year-old violent crisis on the island, the leaders of Bougainville do not want political parties to come in and divide the people once again". In February 2005, it was recognised as a "consultative and advisory body" to the Interim Bougainville Provincial Government ahead of the first elections later that year.

Although Kabui had a stated dislike for political parties, the BPC was registered as a party for the inaugural 2005 election. Kabui ran for the new position of President of the Autonomous Region of Bougainville and won, while party members performed well in the Bougainville House of Representatives. Kabui served as the first President of Bougainville from June 2005 until his death on June 7, 2008.

The party did not contest the 2015 election.
