= Bougainville Revolutionary Army =

Group seeking independence from Papua New Guinea

The Bougainville Revolutionary Army (BRA) was a secessionist group formed in 1988 by Bougainvilleans seeking independence from Papua New Guinea (PNG). The leader of the BRA was Francis Ona who led the BRA against the Papua New Guinea Defence Force during the violent 10 year conflict. Not all BRA members agreed to the Peace Treaty and boycotted it, and have held out in an official no-go zone, protected by members of the Meekamui Defence Force, currently commanded by Moses Pepino.

BRA leaders argued that Bougainville is ethnically part of the Solomon Islands and has not profited from the extensive mining that has occurred on the island. In 1989, BRA leaders proclaimed Bougainville independent from PNG and established the Autonomous Bougainville Government (ABG). As a result, fighting between the BRA and the PNG Defence Force, with support from Australia, escalated.

In January 1991, the Honiara Declaration was signed under which both sides agreed to a ceasefire. This ceasefire was soon broken and fighting continued. In 1997, Bill Skate of the People's National Congress Party was elected Prime Minister of Papua New Guinea and promised that peace in Bougainville would be his highest priority. This led to the signing of a ceasefire agreement, the Rotokas Record, and a movement towards peace and the autonomy of Bougainville. As a result, the BRA is no longer actively engaged in fighting, although some of its leaders are involved in the ABG.

== See also ==
- History of Bougainville
- Francis Ona
- Bougainville Civil War
