= Joseph Kabui =

Papua New Guinean politician

1st President of the Autonomous Region of Bougainville
- In office 15 June 2005 – 7 June 2008
- Vice President: John Tabinaman
- Preceded by: Office established
- Succeeded by: John Tabinaman

Personal details
- Born: Joseph Canisius Kabui; 1954 Territory of New Guinea
- Died: 7 June 2008 (aged 53-54) Buka, Autonomous Region of Bougainville
- Party: Bougainville People's Congress
- Spouse: Rose Mary Kabui

Joseph Canisius Kabui (1954 – 7 June 2008) was a secessionist leader and the first President of the Autonomous Region of Bougainville, off the coast of Papua New Guinea, from 2005 to 2008. He was also the leader of the Bougainville People's Congress.

== Political career ==
Kabui was a commander in the Bougainville Revolutionary Army during the war in Bougainville in the 1990s. In June 2005, after the island gained autonomy within Papua New Guinea, he was elected as President of Bougainville by a large majority, winning 38,000 out of 69,385 votes.

While in office, he granted a Canadian company, Invincible Resources, access rights to 70% of Bougainville's mineral resources, and he was widely criticized for this decision. This was announced in 2008 with no prior discussion in Parliament, and shortly before Kabui's death it was expected that a motion of no-confidence would be presented against him. In an interview shortly before his death, he said that his dream was "to see Bougainville [become] a Kuwait of the Pacific".

=== Death and funeral ===
Kabui went to Brisbane for medical treatment prior. He died on 7 June 2008 at a hospital in Buka. United Nations Secretary-General Ban Ki-moon called Kabui a "skilled mediator and peacemaker who had a genuine interest in the future of his people", and according to Australian Foreign Minister Stephen Smith, Kabui played a "key role in restoring Bougainville to peace following the bitter conflict on the island". A state funeral was held for Kabui at the St. Joseph's Roman Catholic Church in Boroko in Port Moresby on 10 June. His body was returned to Buka on 11 June, and a funeral mass was held for him in Buka on 12 June. His body was planned to be taken to Arawa, Panguna, and finally the village of Padorima in Central Bougainville. The Bougainville government declared a public holiday to mourn Kabui.

Kabui was believed to have died of a heart attack. In an interview with the newspaper Port-Courier, that he gave 12 hours before his death, Kabui said that he had stopped taking his heart medicine four months beforehand and was taking a water tonic instead because the medicine was too expensive. He dismissed suggestions of seeking help, saying that "I am not a man that would ask for things that concern me", and he also said that he had missed a medical check-up because he was too busy with work. His next check-up was scheduled for later in June, but he noted that the necessary trip to Australia was expensive as well.

Vice-President John Tabinaman became Acting President following Kabui's death. The existing method for filling a vacancy in the presidency is to hold a new popular election, and Tabinaman described this as likely, while also noting the possibility of a constitutional amendment that would instead allow Parliament to elect one of its members as president. Planning for a new popular election subsequently began.

== See also ==
- Francis Ona

Preceded by None	President of the Autonomous Region of Bougainville; June 2005 – 7 June 2008	Succeeded by John Tabinaman (acting)
