= Bougainville =

Bougainville may refer to:

== Places ==
- Autonomous Region of Bougainville, historically known as the North Solomons, an autonomous region in Papua New Guinea
  - Bougainville Island, the main island of the Autonomous Region of Bougainville in Papua New Guinea
    - Bougainville campaign, World War II
- Bougainville Strait, a strait which separates Choiseul Island (Solomon Islands) from Bougainville Island (Papua New Guinea)
- Bougainville, Somme, a commune in the Somme department, France
- Bougainville Peninsula in the Kimberley region of Western Australia
  - Cape Bougainville, at the top of the peninsula
- Cape Bougainville, East Falkland, Falkland Islands, Falklands (United Kingdom)
- Isla Bougainville, the Spanish name for Lively Island in the Falkland Islands

== People ==
- Louis-Antoine de Bougainville (1729–1811), French navigator, explorer, and military commander
- Hyacinthe de Bougainville (1781–1846), French naval officer and son of Louis-Antoine de Bougainville
- Jean-Pierre de Bougainville (1722–1763), French writer, member of the Académie française, brother to Louis-Antoine de Bougainville

== Ships ==
- French ship Bougainville, various French ships named in honour of Louis Antoine de Bougainville
- Bougainville-class aviso, a group of colonial avisos, or sloops, built for the French Navy during the 1930s
- USS Bougainville (CVE-100), later CVU-100, a United States Navy Casablanca-class escort aircraft carrier
- CMA CGM Bougainville, a motor vessel, container ship of the French company CMA CGM, flagged by France

== Literature and film ==
- Bougainville – Our Island Our Fight, a documentary film directed by Wayne Coles-Janess
- Bougainville (novel), a 1981 novel by Dutch author F. Springer
- The Tetherballs of Bougainville, a 1998 novel by American author Mark Leyner

== Other uses ==
- Comte de Bougainville (Count of Bougainville), a French title of nobility held by Louis Antoine de Bougainville
- Bougainville Park, Papeete, French Polynesia (France); a park in Papeete

== See also ==
- Bougainvillea, a genus of flowering plants native to South America
- Bougainvillia, a genus of hydroids
- Bougainvilliidae, a familia of hydroids
- Bougainville Campaign, a World War II military campaign fought from 1943 to 1945 between the Allies and Japan on and around Bougainville Island
  - Bougainville counterattack, a battle within the campaign during March 1944
- Bougainville Civil War, 1988–1998
- Bougainville People's Congress, a pro-independence organisation and later political party
- New Bougainville Party, founded 2005
