= In the Shadow of the Palms =

- Directed by: Wayne Coles-Janess
- Written by: Wayne Coles-Janess
- Produced by: Wayne Coles-Janess
- Cinematography: Wayne Coles-Janess
- Edited by: Wayne Coles-Janess
- Distributed by: Ipso-Facto Productions
- Release date: 2005
- Running time: 90 minutes
- Country: Australia
- Language: Arabic

In the Shadow of the Palms (2005) is a documentary produced and directed by the Australian filmmaker Wayne Coles-Janess. He filmed it in Iraq prior to, during and after the fall of Saddam Hussein after the 2003 invasion of Iraq led by the U.S. An Arab-language film, it documents the changes in Iraqi society and the lives of ordinary Iraqis by focusing on a cross-section of individuals.

== Summary ==
In the Shadow of the Palms documents how life was for the society and people living under the Saddam regime after 12 years of United States sanctions. It follows a number of individuals as they prepare for the coalition war against them, continuing to tell their stories during the bombings. The film observed first hand the devastating effects of the extensive bombing campaign on the lives of civilians. The documentary gives the viewer an intimate, character-based insight into Iraqi society. It has won numerous awards and been featured at international festivals.

The director Coles-Janess spent months in Baghdad during his filming, returning for more work after the new Iraqi government was established.

== Production ==
Coles-Janess went to Baghdad, Iraq in March 2003, before the war, and stayed for weeks through the allied bombing and invasion. He returned in November 2003 for three months to see how people were doing after the initial occupation. He was frequently stopped and arrested, but continued to gain freedom and the ability to move around.

== Reception ==
=== Festival awards ===
- Audience Award - Yamagata International Documentary Film Festival
- Honourable Mention - Bangkok International Film Festival
- Glenfiddich Independent Spirit Award - Inside Film Awards
- Best Feature Documentary Nomination - Lexus Inside Film Awards
- Best Documentary - Anchorage International Film Festival
- Best Documentary – Atlanta International Documentary Film Festival
- Special Mention - Cine India International Film Festival/Indian Cine Film Festival (March 2007)
- Best Documentary - Mexico International Film Festival 2007

=== Official selection and invitations ===
- Yamagata International Documentary Film Festival 2005 (7–13 October 2005)
- 18th Singapore International Film Festival (14–30 April 2005)
- 20th International Munich Documentary Film Festival (6–14 May 2005)
- 7th Amnesty International Film Festival Amsterdam (9–13 March 2005)
- Commonwealth Film Festival – England (May 2005)
- National Museum of Photography, Film & Television (4–19 March 2005)
- Revelation - Perth International Film Festival (July 2005)
- Arab Film Festival – Rotterdam (1–5 June 2005)
- CinÈ Droit Libre Festival - Burkina Faso
- Lucania Film Festival – Italy (August 2005)
- Bonner Kinemathek Festival – "New Orient" Film Festival - Germany (July 2005)
- Brooklyn International Film Festival (2–11 June 2006)
- New Zealand International Film Festival (September–October 2005)
- International Film Festival of India (October–November 2005)
- AMAL Arab Film Festival – Spain (October 2005)
- Cinemanila – Philippines (12–25 October 2005)
- Bonner Kinmathetik – Germany (November 2005)
- Artechock Film Festival Screening (November 2005)
- Chennai International Film Festival - India (December 2005)
- Fajr International Film Festival – Iran
- Tiburon International Film Festival
- Bangkok International Film Festival
- Thessaloniki Documentary Festival (March 2006)
- London Australian Film Festival (2–12 March 2006)
- ZagrebDox International Film Festival – Croatia (21–26 February 2005)
- International relations film festival - Wellesley College, Boston, Massachusetts
- Ankara International Film Festival (16–26 March 2006)
- It's All True Film Festival – Brazil (25 March-2 April 2006)
- DocuFest – Atlanta International Documentary Film Festival (25–29 August 2005)
- Winnipeg International Film Festival – Canada (8–11 June 2006)
- Anchorage Film Festival – Alaska (1–10 December 2006)
- Rio de Janeiro International Film Festival (21 September- 5 October 2006)
- Rhode Island International Film Festival (8–13 August 2006)
- Kansas International Film Festival
- Australian International Film Festival
- Hot Springs International Film Festival
- Istanbul International Documentary Film Festival
- International Festival of Audiovisual programs
- Bogotá Film Festival - Colombia
- Cine India International Film Festival/Indian Cine Film Festival (March 2007)
- Hyderabad International Film Festival (March 2007)
- Mexico International Film Festival 2007

== See also ==
- Life at the End of the Rainbow
- Bougainville – Our Island Our Fight
