= Tupaia =

Tupaia may refer to:

- Tupaia (navigator), an 18th-century Tahitian navigator, who accompanied James Cook on his first voyage of discovery
- Tupaia (mammal), a genus of treeshrew
- Andy Tupaia, a French Polynesian musician
