= Bougainville Strait =

Coordinates: 6.40°S 156.10°E

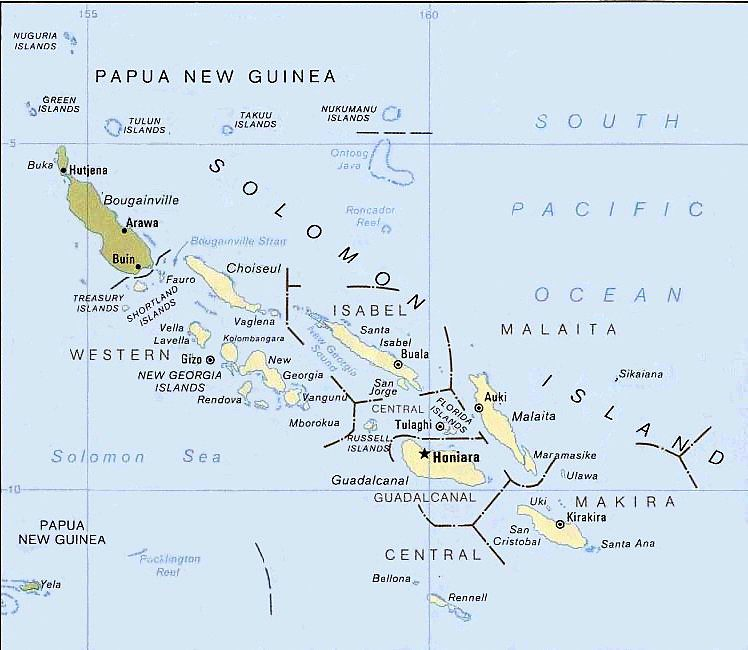
Bougainville Strait separates Bougainville Island from Choiseul Island

Bougainville Strait separates Choiseul Island, part of Solomon Islands, from Bougainville Island, part of Papua New Guinea. It is not to be confused with the similarly-named Bougainville Strait to the north of Waigeo island in the Raja Ampat Islands in Indonesia. The first European to pass through the strait in the Solomon Islands was Louis Antoine de Bougainville in 1768, whose name was given to this water pathway. Lieutenant John Shortland of the Royal Navy sailed through the strait in 1788, giving the name of Treasury Islands to the numerous islands, lying in the strait. He named the strait after himself, but it later became known as Bougainville.

Bougainville Strait is part of the navigation route for merchant shipping from Torres Strait to the Panama Canal. It is one of three major routes for merchant shipping through the Solomon Islands; the routes are the Bougainville Strait and Indispensable Strait which link the Pacific Ocean, Solomon Sea and Coral Sea; and the Manning Strait that links the Pacific to New Georgia Sound, which is also known as ‘The Slot’, through which Japanese naval ships resupplied the garrison on Guadalcanal during the Pacific War.

== See also ==
- Bougainville – Our Island Our Fight (1998) by the multi-award-winning director Wayne Coles-Janess. The first footage of the war from behind the blockade. The critically acclaimed and internationally award-winning documentary is shown around the world. Produced and directed by Wayne Coles-Janess.
