= Kerguelen (disambiguation) =

Kerguelen may refer to:

== Geography ==
- Kerguelen Islands, a French territory located in the southern Indian Ocean
- Kerguelen Plateau, submerged continent in the southern Indian Ocean and the foundation of the Kerguelen Islands
- Kerguelen hotspot, a geological hotspot in the Kerguelen Plateau

== Biography ==
- Michel Kerguélen (1928–1999), French botanist
- Yves-Joseph de Kerguelen-Trémarec (1734-1797), French explorer

== Music ==
- Kerguelen Vortex, an EP released in 2011 by the Japanese group Aural Vampire

== Ships ==
- CMA CGM Kerguelen, Britain's largest container ship (as of May 2015)
- French cruiser Kerguélen, a 19th-century cruiser of the French Navy
