= Papeete =

Capital city of French Polynesia

Papeʻete
- Commune
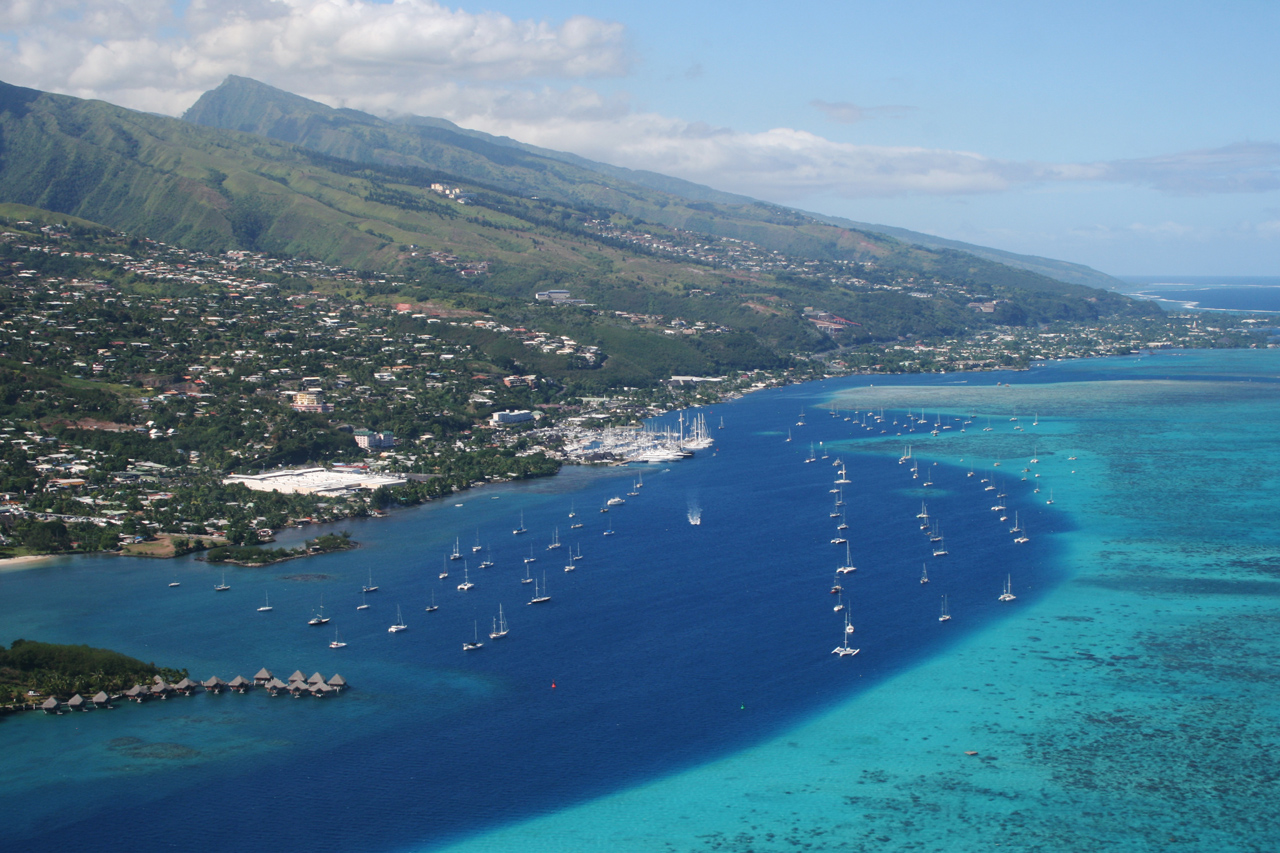
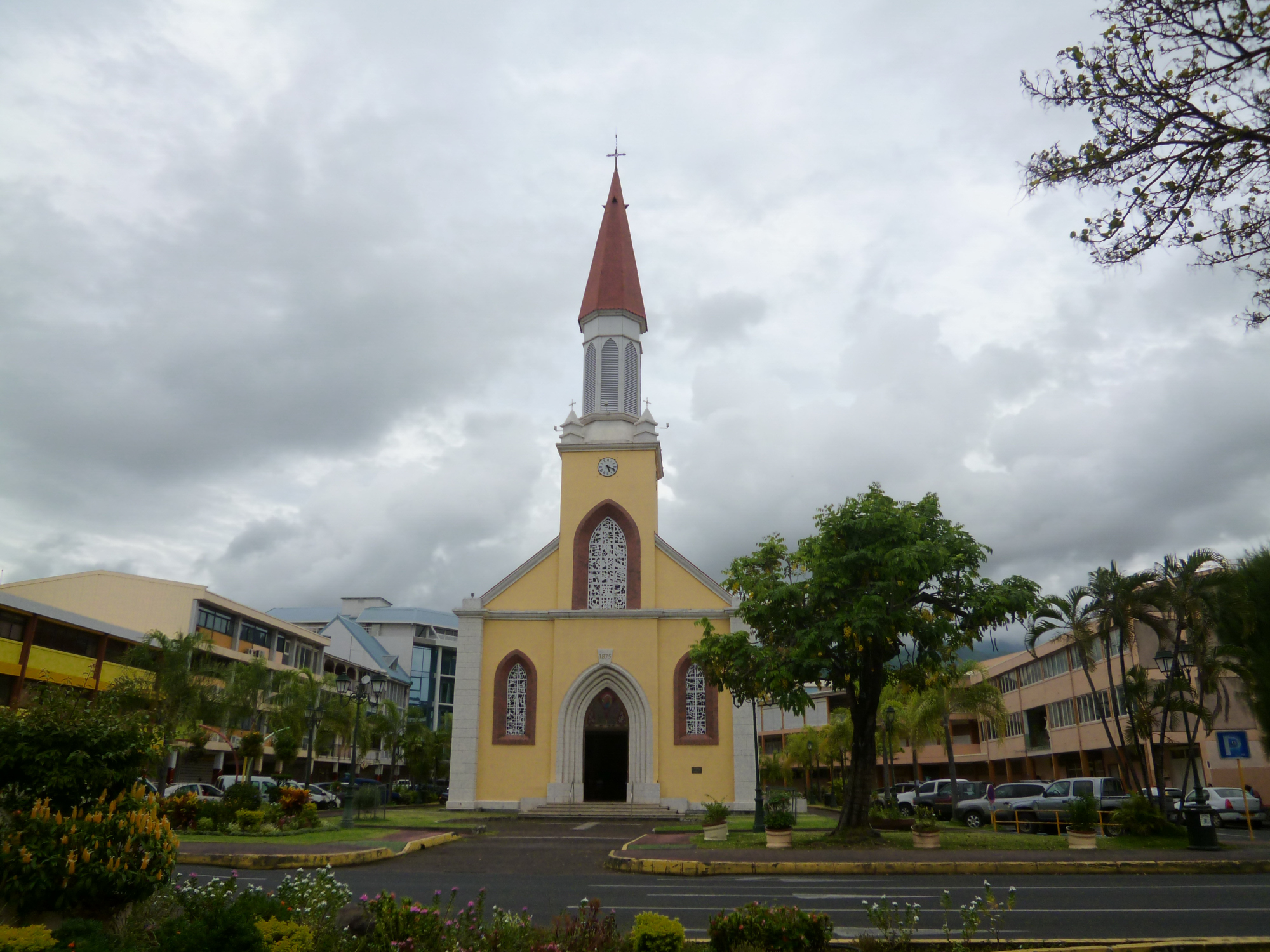
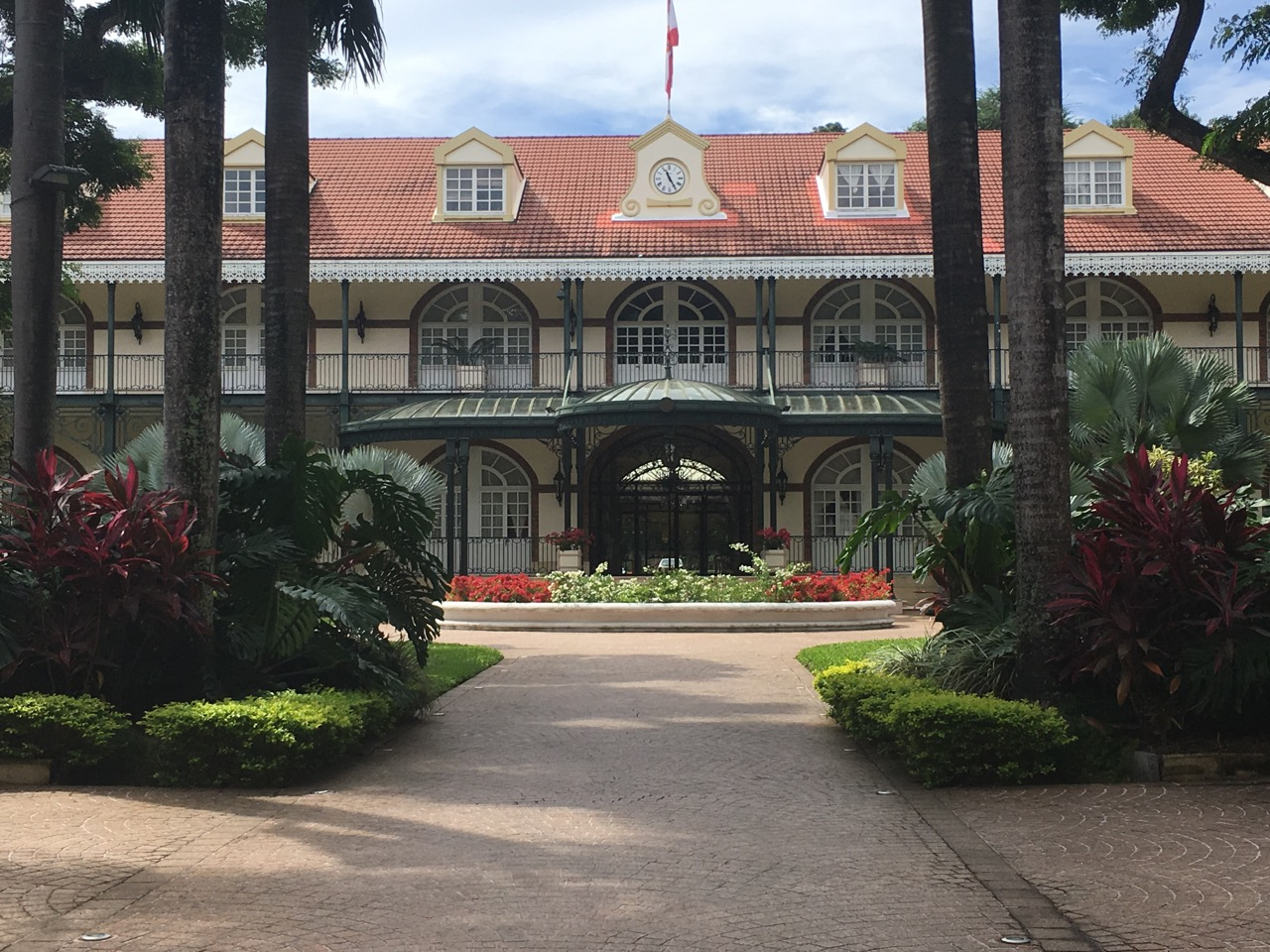
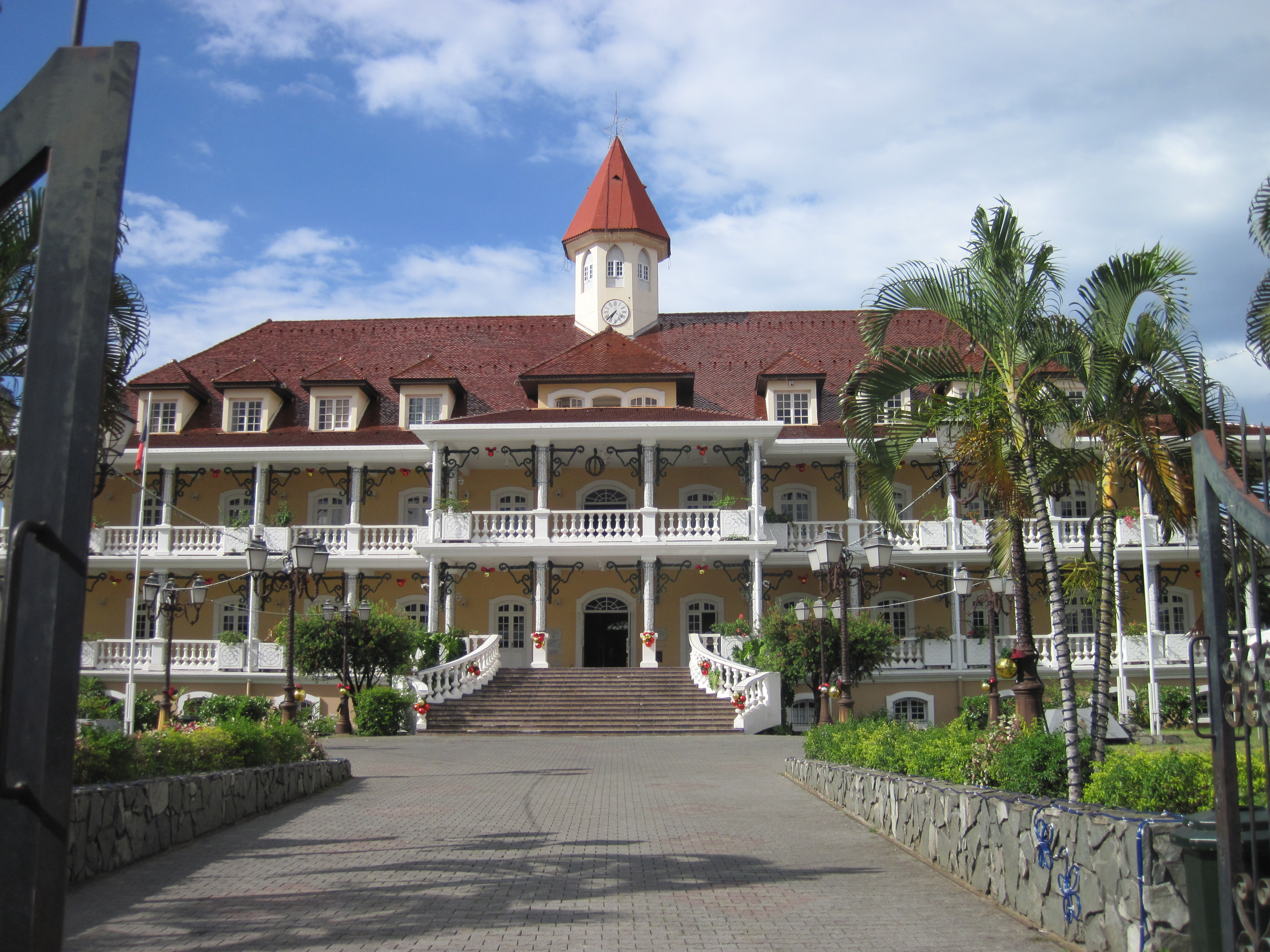
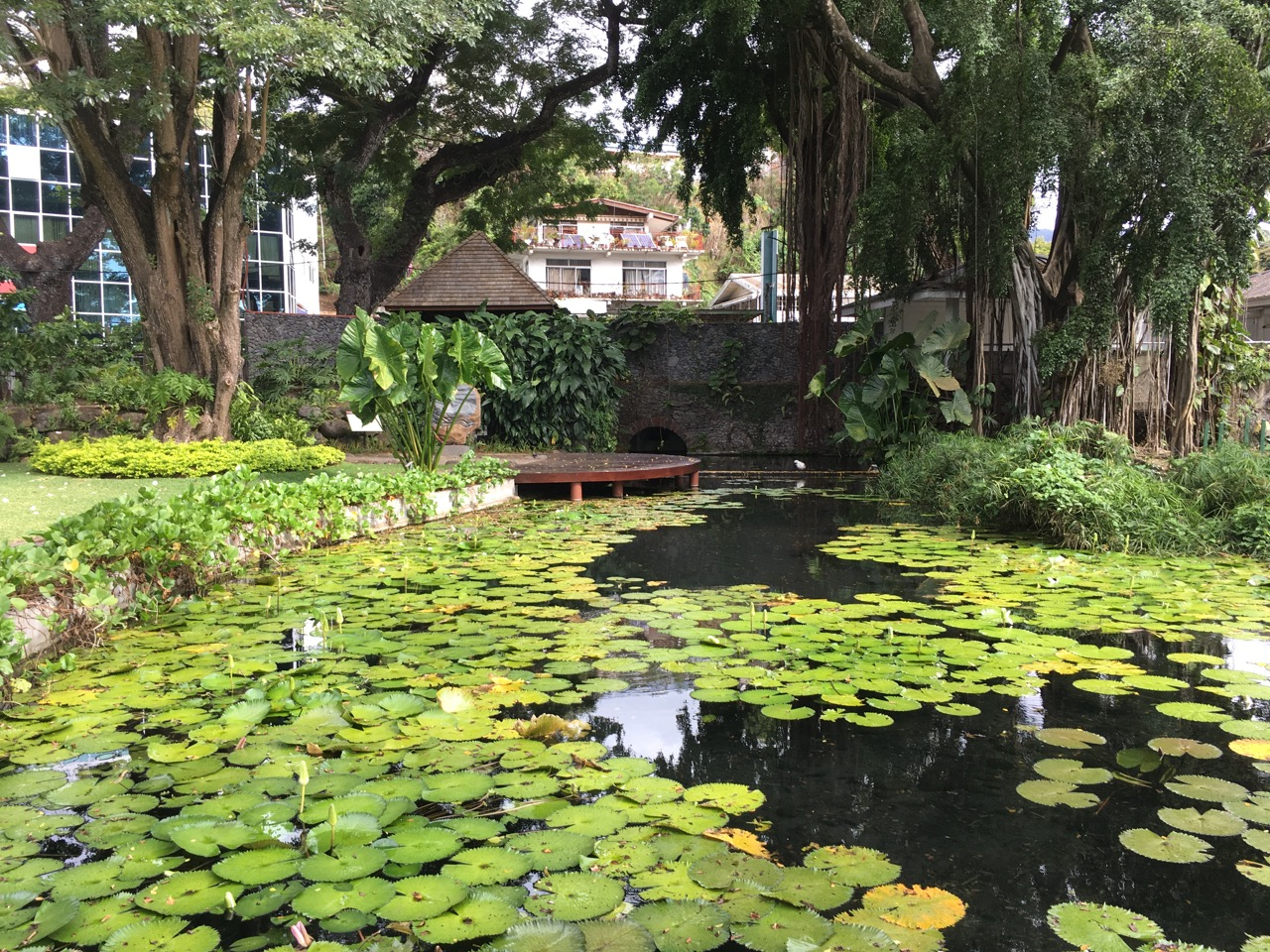
- Top: aerial view of Papeʻete; middle: Cathedral of Notre Dame of Papeʻete, Presidential palace; bottom: Papeʻete City Hall, Bougainville Park

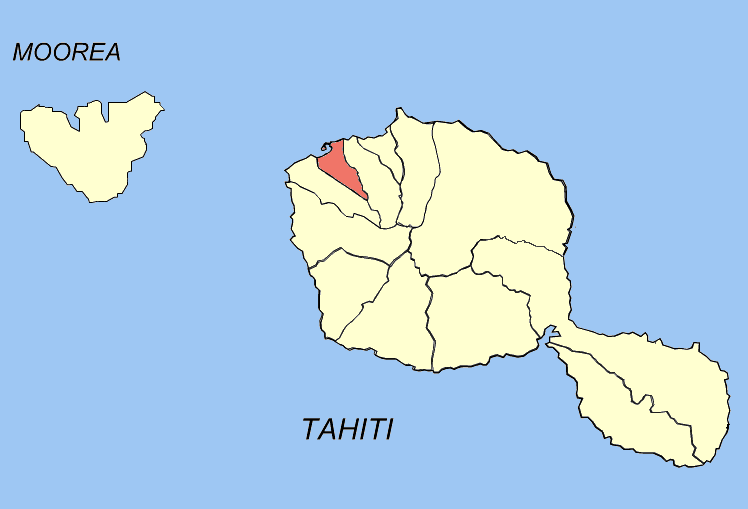
- Location of the commune (in red) within the Windward Islands
- Location of Papeʻete
- Coordinates: 17°32′06″S 149°34′11″W
- Country: France
- Overseas collectivity: French Polynesia
- Subdivision: Windward Islands

Government
  - Mayor (2026–32): Rémy Brillant
- Area^{1}: 17.4 km^{2} (6.7 sq mi)
  - Urban: 299.5 km^{2} (115.6 sq mi)
- Highest elevation: 621 m (2,037 ft)
- Lowest elevation: 0 m (0 ft)
- Population (2022): 26,654
  - Density: 1,530/km^{2} (3,970/sq mi)
  - Urban: 124,274
  - Urban density: 414.9/km^{2} (1,075/sq mi)
- Time zone: UTC−10:00
- INSEE/Postal code: 98735 /98714
- ^{1} French Land Register data, which excludes lakes, ponds, glaciers > 1 km^{2} (0.386 sq mi or 247 acres) and river estuaries.

Papeete (Tahitian: Papeʻete, pronounced [pa.pe.ʔe.te]) is the capital city of French Polynesia, an overseas collectivity of the French Republic located in the Pacific Ocean. The commune of Papeʻete is located on the island of Tahiti, in the administrative subdivision of the Windward Islands, of which Papeʻete is the administrative capital. Both the President of French Polynesia and French High Commissioner reside in Papeʻete.

It is the primary center of Tahitian and French Polynesian public and private governmental, commercial, industrial, and financial services, the hub of French Polynesian tourism and a commonly used port of call. The Windward Islands are themselves part of the Society Islands. The name Papeʻete, (Note: Sometimes also spelled Papeete in languages other than Tahitian. The use of the ʻokina, which looks similar to an apostrophe, to represent the glottal stop, is promoted by the Académie Tahitienne and accepted by the territorial government (see http://www.farevanaa.pf/theme_detail.php?id=5). The ʻokina, however, is sometimes omitted.) means "water from a basket"— this was an effect of a naming taboo during Pōmare I's reign where the Tahitian contemporary word for water vai was substituted with pape, the old name Vaiʻete is still recognised in some areas such as the Marquesas. The urban area of Papeʻete had a total population of 124,274 inhabitants (Note: The urban area includes Papeete, Faʼaʼā, Punaʻauiʻa, Pīraʻe, Ārue & Māhina) at the 2022 census, 26,654 of whom lived in the commune of Papeʻete proper.

== Geography ==
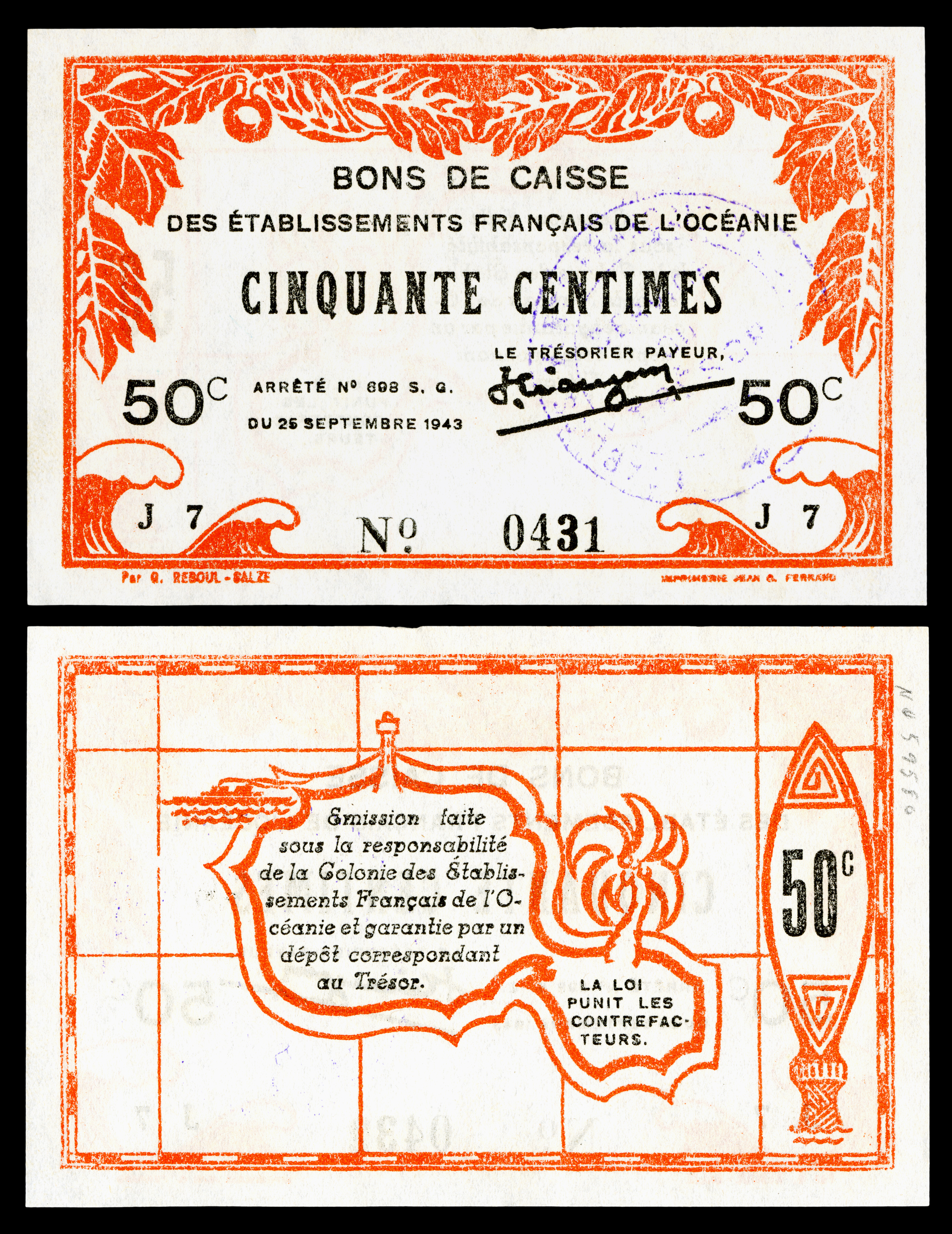
A 50 centimes World War II banknote (1943), printed in Papeʻete, depicting the outline of Tahiti (rev).

The commune of Papeʻete is subdivided into eleven quartiers (wards):

ID Quartier	Quartier	Area km^{2}	Pop. 2017-08-17	Density /km^{2}	Location
35A	Manuhōʻē - Fareʻute - Motu uta	1.15	2,301	2,000	Coast
35B	Patutoʻa	0.44	1,653	3,748	Coast
35C	Taunoa	0.40	2,187	5,512	Coast
35D	Fāriʻipiti	0.34	1,811	5,332	Near coast
35E	Titioro	3.53	3,566	1,009	Inland
35F	Tepapa	4.63	3,407	736	Inland
35G	Faiere	0.87	1,933	2,213	Coast
35H	Pic Rouge	3.23	1,973	611	Inland
35I	Tīpaeruʻi	1.93	4,187	2,143	Coast
35J	Pāʻōfaʻi	0.60	1,638	2,743	Coast
35K	Māmaʻo	0.52	2,269	4,343	Near coast
35	Papeʻete	17.64	26,925	1,526	

Papeʻete: subdivision in 11 quartiers

=== Climate ===
Papeʻete features a tropical monsoon climate (Am according to the Köppen climate classification) with a wet season and dry season, bordering a tropical rainforest climate, with high temperatures and humidity year round. However, precipitation is observed even during the city's dry season. The dry season is short, covering only the months of August and September. The rest of the year is wet, with the heaviest precipitation falling in the months of December and January. Sunshine is moderately high, as most precipitation comes as thunderstorms and cyclones, and does not last for long.

Climate data for Papeʻete (1981–2010 averages, extremes 1976−present)
Month	Jan	Feb	Mar	Apr	May	Jun	Jul	Aug	Sep	Oct	Nov	Dec	Year
Record high °C (°F)	36.0 (96.8)	34.3 (93.7)	35.3 (95.5)	35.0 (95.0)	34.5 (94.1)	33.8 (92.8)	33.0 (91.4)	33.9 (93.0)	33.9 (93.0)	33.9 (93.0)	34.0 (93.2)	34.3 (93.7)	36.0 (96.8)
Mean daily maximum °C (°F)	31.2 (88.2)	31.4 (88.5)	31.9 (89.4)	31.8 (89.2)	31.1 (88.0)	30.3 (86.5)	30.0 (86.0)	30.0 (86.0)	30.3 (86.5)	30.5 (86.9)	30.6 (87.1)	30.4 (86.7)	30.8 (87.4)
Daily mean °C (°F)	27.1 (80.8)	27.2 (81.0)	27.6 (81.7)	27.6 (81.7)	26.8 (80.2)	25.9 (78.6)	25.6 (78.1)	25.5 (77.9)	25.9 (78.6)	26.3 (79.3)	26.6 (79.9)	26.6 (79.9)	26.6 (79.9)
Mean daily minimum °C (°F)	23.0 (73.4)	23.1 (73.6)	23.4 (74.1)	23.3 (73.9)	22.6 (72.7)	21.6 (70.9)	21.2 (70.2)	21.1 (70.0)	21.6 (70.9)	22.1 (71.8)	22.6 (72.7)	22.9 (73.2)	22.4 (72.3)
Record low °C (°F)	19.2 (66.6)	19.2 (66.6)	20.4 (68.7)	20.1 (68.2)	19.5 (67.1)	16.9 (62.4)	16.0 (60.8)	17.0 (62.6)	17.0 (62.6)	16.0 (60.8)	19.0 (66.2)	19.4 (66.9)	16.0 (60.8)
Average precipitation mm (inches)	317.5 (12.50)	277.7 (10.93)	240.2 (9.46)	143.1 (5.63)	149.5 (5.89)	80.8 (3.18)	62.7 (2.47)	66.4 (2.61)	64.3 (2.53)	120.9 (4.76)	155.2 (6.11)	396.8 (15.62)	2,075.1 (81.70)
Average precipitation days (≥ 1.0 mm)	14.6	13.4	11.3	9.2	8.5	6.0	5.7	5.2	5.2	7.8	9.9	15.3	112.1
Mean monthly sunshine hours	215.5	199.2	226.0	230.3	228.6	220.0	235.2	251.1	241.6	232.1	208.7	196.6	2,684.9
Source 1: Meteociel
Source 2: NOAA (sun 1961–1990)

== History of Papeʻete ==
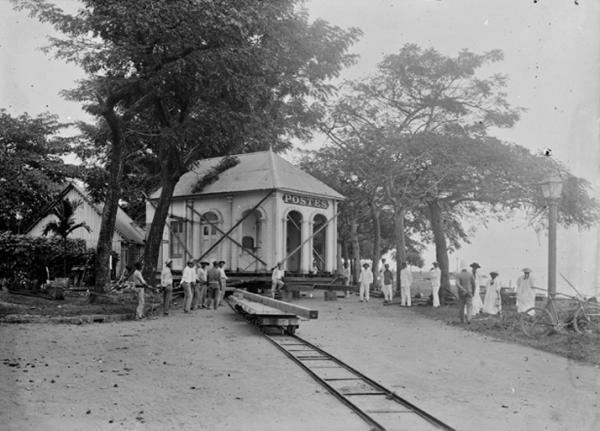
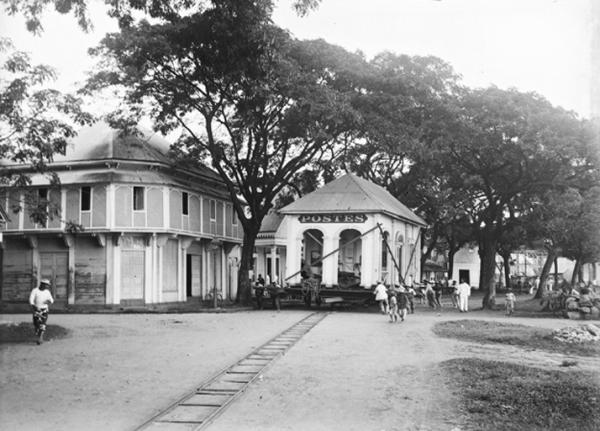
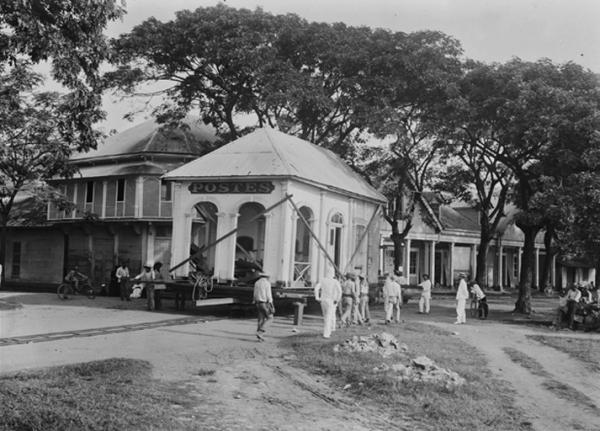
Relocation of the post office using a Decauville railway in 1902

In 1902, it became necessary to move the post office of Papeʻete to another location. Instead of demolishing it and rebuilding it at the new site, it was lifted from the subsoil and moved as a whole on a Decauville railway.

Previously, during the construction of the Faʻaiere water tower with a capacity of 150,000 litres for the drinking water supply of the city of Papeʻete, a difference in altitude of 37 metres (121 ft) was overcome with a light railway laid on a 220 metres (720 ft) long inclined plane. A winch driven by a 12-horsepower Fowler or Decauville locomobile carried three narrow gauge railway trucks at a time, consuming up to 200 kilograms (440 lb) of coal per day for about sixty journeys. Paul Decauville mentioned in a letter to Governor Theodore Lacascade, dated 18 June 1891, an order for "15 kilometres (9.3 mi) of 600 mm (1 ft 11 5/8 in) portable rail tracks and about 12,000 francs of rolling stock, payable in three years", presumably for a tramway from Papeʻete to Punaʻauia operated by hand or animals.

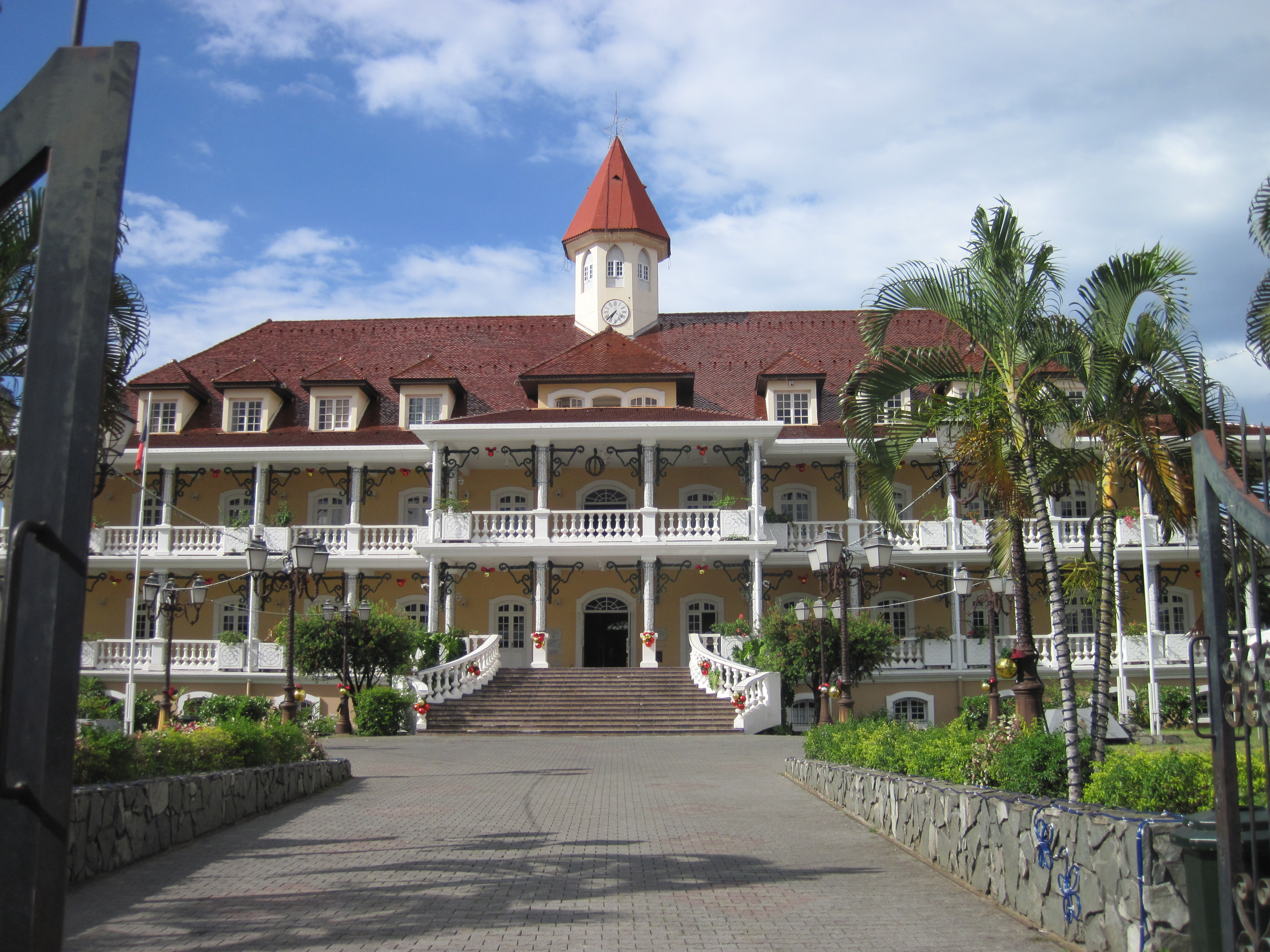
Papeʻete Town Hall, a replica of the Royal Palace of Papeʻete razed in the 1960s

Following the outbreak of World War I, Papeʻete was shelled by German vessels, causing loss of life and significant damage.

The growth of the city was boosted by the decision to move the French nuclear weapon test range from Algeria, which had become independent, to the atolls of Moruroa and Fangataufa, some 1,500 km (930 mi) to the east of Tahiti. This was motivated, in particular, by the construction of the Faʻaʻā International Airport, the only international airport in French Polynesia, near Papeʻete. In 1983, The Church of Jesus Christ of Latter-day Saints built the Papeʻete Tahiti Temple here because of its large number of members in the region. On 5 September 1995 the government of Jacques Chirac conducted the first of a series of nuclear test detonations off the shores of Moruroa. A resulting riot in Papeʻete lasted for two days and damaged the international airport, injured 40 people, and scared away tourism for some time. Similar rioting had occurred after another French nuclear test in the same area in 1987.

== Transportation ==
The streets of the town center are very busy, and traffic can be a problem since they are very narrow. The Tahiti freeway starts close to the town center as Pōmare Boulevard, named after the Tahitian Royal Family of the 19th century. By air, passengers depart from the Faʻaʻā International Airport. Domestic interisland service is operated by Air Tahiti with international flights being operated by Air Tahiti Nui, Air France, LATAM Chile, United and other airlines. By sea, passengers can use a marine ferry service for travel to Moorea or a Bora Bora cruise line service for travel to Bora Bora.

== Demographics ==
The urban area of Papeʻete had a total population of 124,724 inhabitants at the 2022 census, 26,654 of whom lived in the commune of Papeʻete proper. The urban area of Papeʻete is made up of six communes. They are listed from northeast to southwest:

- Māhina
- ʻĀrue
- Pīraʻe
- Papeʻete (historically the most populous commune in the urban area, and still the administrative capital)
- Faʼaʼā (which became in 1988 the most populous commune in the urban area)
- Punaʻauia

=== Historical population ===
	1956	1962	1971	1977	1983	1988	1996	2002	2007	2012	2017
Papeʻete (commune)	18,089	19,903	25,342	22,967	23,496	23,555	25,553	26,222	26,017	25,769	26,926
Papeʻete (urban area)	28,975	35,514	65,185	77,781	93,294	103,857	115,759	127,327	131,695	133,627	136,771
Official figures from population censuses.

Average population growth of the Papeʻete urban area:

- 1956–1962: +1,107 people per year (+3.5% per year)
- 1962–1971: +3,597 people per year (+7.6% per year)
- 1971–1977: +2,025 people per year (+2.9% per year)
- 1977–1983: +2,400 people per year (+2.9% per year)
- 1983–1988: +2,158 people per year (+2.2% per year)
- 1988–1996: +1,489 people per year (+1.4% per year)
- 1996–2002: +1,873 people per year (+1.6% per year)
- 2002–2007: +913 people per year (+0.7% per year)
- 2007–2012: +386 people per year (+0.3% per year)
- 2012–2017: +631 people per year (+0.5% per year)

=== Migrations ===
The places of birth of the 136,771 residents in the Papeʻete urban area at the 2017 census were the following (2007 census in parentheses):

- 72.5% were born in Tahiti (up from 68.4% at the 2007 census)
- 11.3% in Metropolitan France (down from 12.8% at the 2007 census)
- 6.2% in the Society Islands (other than Tahiti) (down from 6.8% at the 2007 census)
- 2.9% in the Tuamotu-Gambier (down from 3.6% at the 2007 census)
- 1.9% in the Marquesas Islands (down from 2.1% at the 2007 census)
- 1.6% in the Austral Islands (down from 2.0% at the 2007 census)
- 1.3% in the overseas departments and territories of France other than French Polynesia (0.9% in New Caledonia and Wallis and Futuna; 0.4% in the other overseas departments and collectivities) (down from 1.6% at the 2007 census)
- 0.6% in Southeast Asia and East Asia (down from 0.7% at the 2007 census)
- 0.4% in North Africa (most of them Pieds-Noirs) (down from 0.5% at the 2007 census)
- 1.3% in other foreign countries (down from 1.5% at the 2007 census)

=== Languages ===
At the 2017 census, 98.4% of the population in the urban area of Papeʻete whose age was 15 years and older reported that they could speak French (up from 98.2% at the 2007 census). 96.7% reported that they could also read and write it (up from 96.5% at the 2007 census). Only 0.7% of the population whose age was 15 years and older had no knowledge of French (down from 1.2% at the 2007 census).

At the same census, 83.9% of the population in the urban area of Papeʻete whose age was 15 years and older reported that the language they spoke the most at home was French (up from 79.7% at the 2007 census). 13.5% reported that Tahitian was the language they spoke the most at home (down from 16.5% at the 2007 census). 1.2% reported another Polynesian language (down from 1.7% at the 2007 census), 0.9% reported a Chinese dialect (down from 1.6% at the 2007 census), half of whom speak Hakka, and 0.5% reported another language (same as in 2007).

19.8% of the population in the urban area of Papeʻete whose age was 15 years and older reported that they had no knowledge of any Polynesian language at the 2017 census (up from 19.5% at the 2007 census), whereas 80.2% reported that they had some form of knowledge of at least one Polynesian language (down from 80.5% at the 2007 census).

== Travel and tourism ==
Travelling tourists arrive and depart Papeʻete by private yacht or via cruise ship at Papeʻete Harbor, or by air at Faʻaʻā International Airport, which was completed and opened in 1962.

== Main sights ==
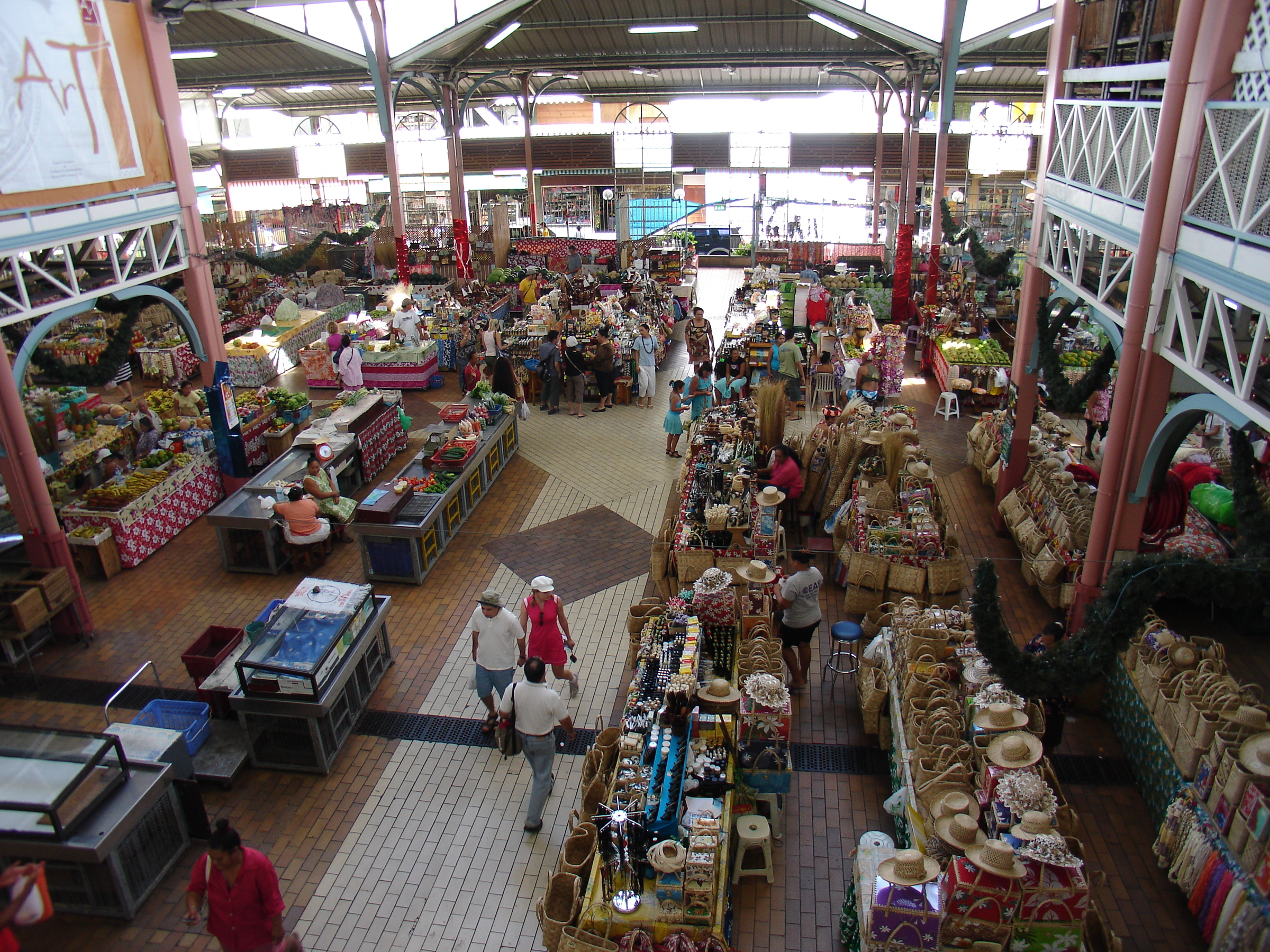
Marché Papeʻete

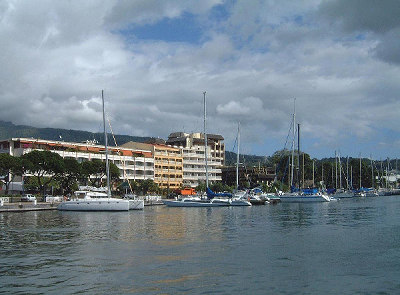
Papeʻete waterfront

- The waterfront esplanade.
- Bougainville Park (once named Albert Park, in honour of a former Belgian king and World War One hero), is now named for Louis Antoine de Bougainville, the first French explorer to circumnavigate the globe.
- Cathedral of Notre Dame of Papeʻete.
- The Territorial Assembly is the heart of the Polynesian government and contains the Territorial Assembly building, the High Commissioner's residence and also a once popular clubhouse of Paul Gauguin. It was also once the site of the royal residence and palace of Queen Pōmare IV of Tahiti, who ruled from 1827 to 1877.
- Presidential palace.
- Papeʻete Market
- The Papeʻete Tahiti Temple of the Church of Jesus Christ of Latter-day Saints.
- The Monument to Pouvanaʻa a Oʻopa (a decorated World War I hero, Tahitian nationalist, and deputy to Paris for the Tahitian Territorial Assembly).
- The Mairie (town hall).

== In popular culture ==
- The film El pasajero clandestino deals with several people trying to take control of the inheritance of a recently deceased English film magnate, who traveled to Papeʻete to look for the heir.
- Papeʻete is mentioned in the songs "Southern Cross" by Crosby, Stills & Nash and "Somewhere Over China" by Jimmy Buffett.
- Papeʻete is mentioned in Bruce Brown's surf film The Endless Summer as one of the surf sites visited by the two longboarders chasing the summer season around the world. The beach at Papeʻete is dubbed "Ins and outs" because the steep shore causes waves to break in both directions—toward the beach and out to sea.
- The first chapter of Robert A. Heinlein's 1984 novel Job: A Comedy of Justice is set in Papeʻete.
- Papeʻete is where Robert Louis Stevenson's "The Ebb Tide" begins.
- Papeʻete is a setting in Mutiny on the Bounty.
- Papeʻete, a schooner built by Matthew Turner, who had extensive business interests in Tahiti, was known for a fast passage from San Francisco to Tahiti of 17 days.
- Papeʻete is mentioned in Paul Thomas Anderson's crime-drama film Inherent Vice as a possible destination (never reached) of Burke Stodger in a getaway on his boat after being blacklisted by Hollywood.

== Economy ==
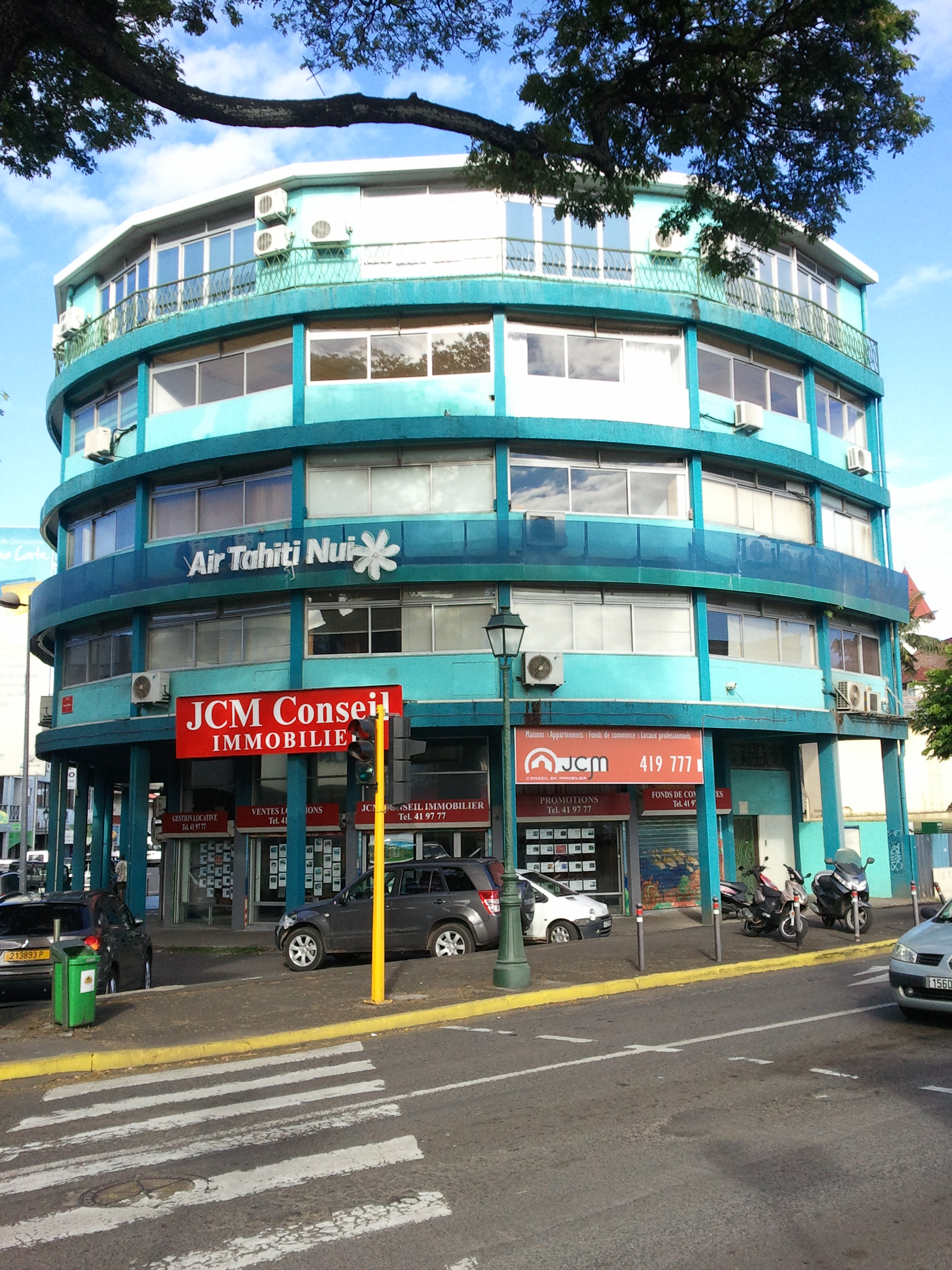
Immeuble Dexter, the former head office of Air Tahiti Nui

Air Moana has its head office in the Fare Tony in Papeʻete.

Air Tahiti Nui formerly had its head office in the Immeuble Dexter in Papeʻete.

== Education ==
The Lycée Paul-Gauguin is located in the city.

== Notable people ==
- Chantal Galenon, politician and women's rights activist
- Unutea Hirshon, politician and activist
- Andy Tupaia, musician

== Gallery ==
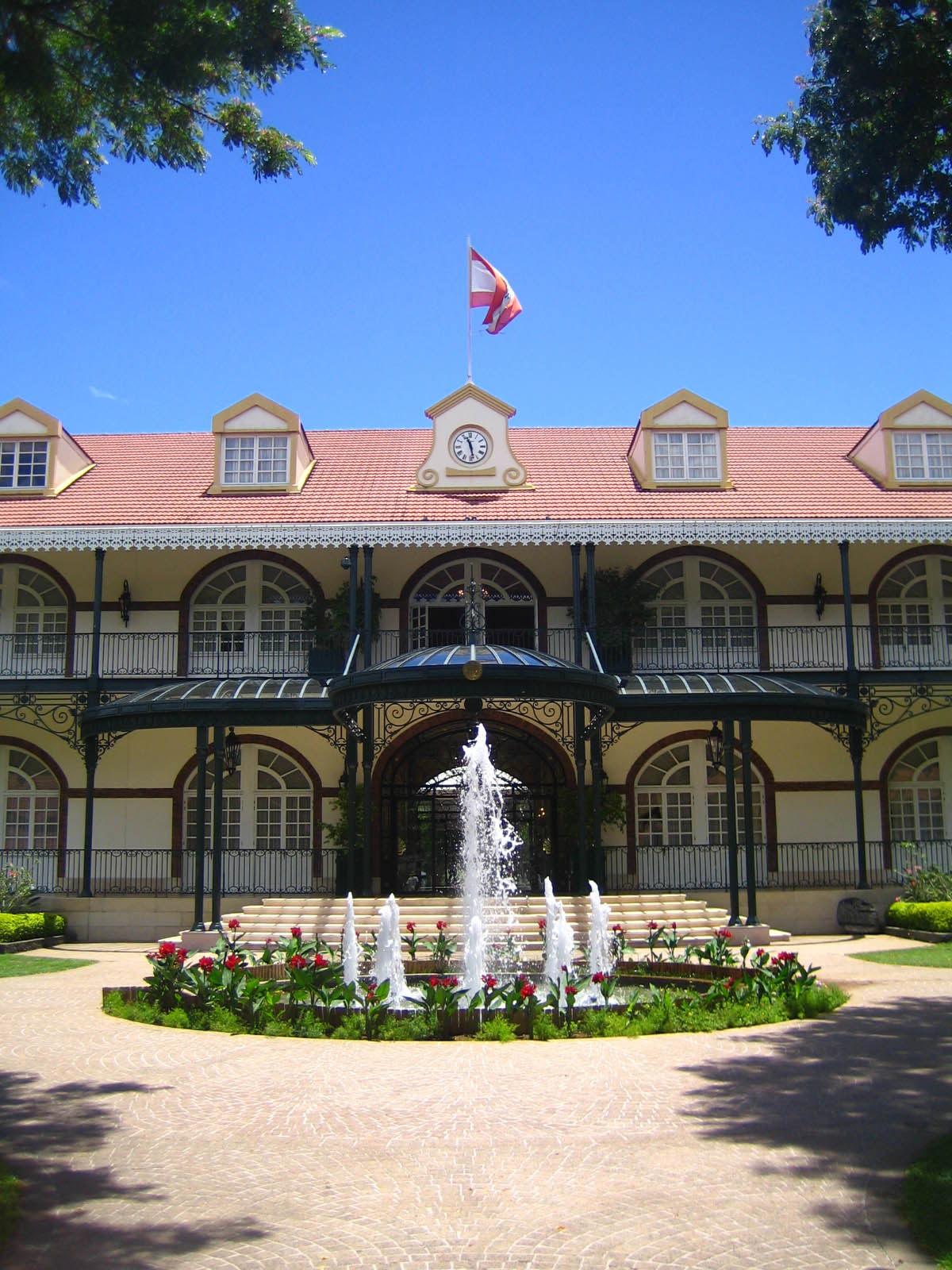
Présidence

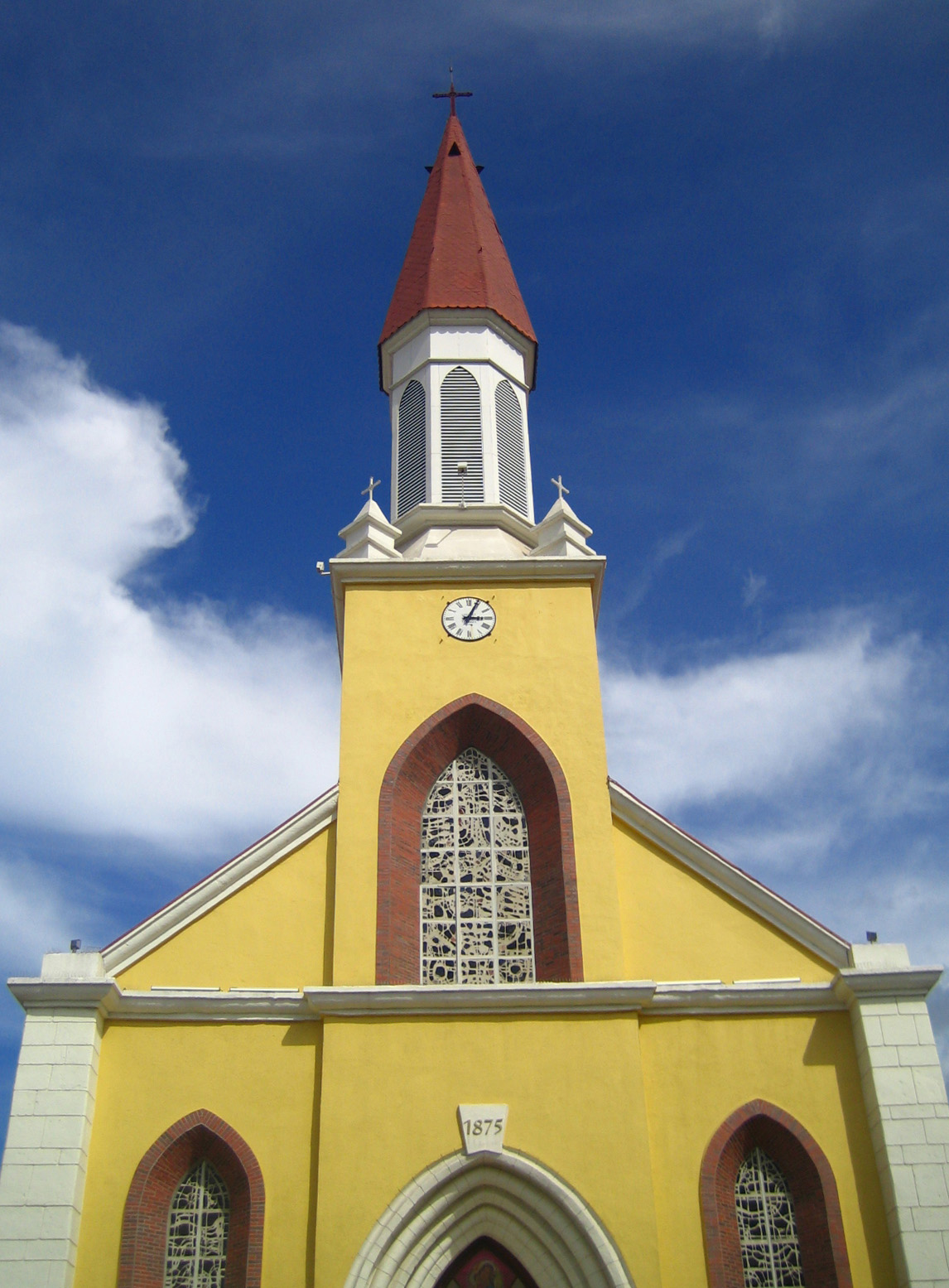
Papeete Cathedral

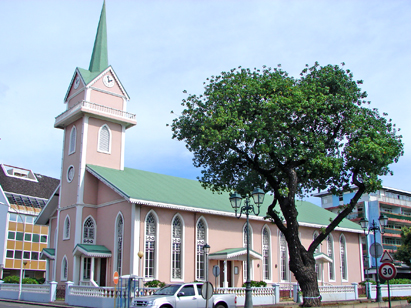
Paofai Temple

== See also ==
- Windward Islands (Society Islands)

== General and cited references ==
- Kay, Robert F. (2001). Hidden Tahiti. Berkeley, California: Ulysses Press. ISBN 1-56975-222-2.
