= Cape Bougainville =

Cape on East Falkland, Falkland Islands

Coordinates: 51.3027°S 58.4661°W

Cape Bougainville is the second-most northerly point on East Falkland, Falkland Islands, after Cape Dolphin, and is the second-most northerly point of the two main islands, East and West Falkland. Many of the smaller islands, such as the Jason Islands, are further north.

The name (like Port Louis) comes from the French navigator Louis de Bougainville, who established the first settlement in the archipelago in the 1760s.
