= CMA CGM Kerguelen =

South Korea–built Anglo-French cargo ship

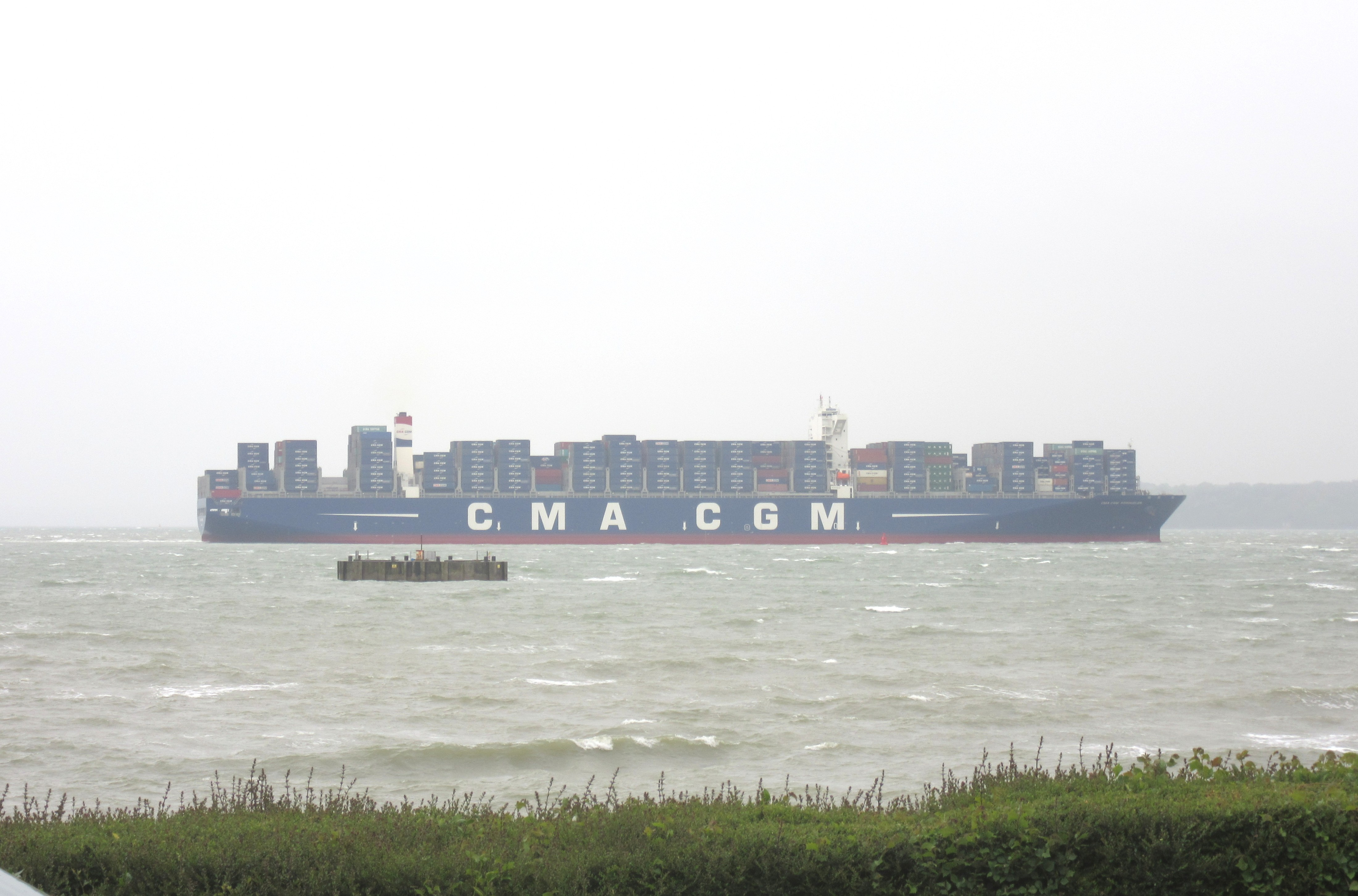
- CMA CGM Kerguelen in the Solent after leaving Southampton on her maiden voyage 14 May 2015.

History
- Name: CMA CGM Kerguelen
- Operator: CMA CGM
- Port of registry: London, United Kingdom
- Builder: Samsung Heavy Industries
- Launched: March 2015
- Maiden voyage: May 2015
- Identification: Call sign: 2IBR5; IMO number: 9702132; MMSI number: 235108381
- Status: In service

General characteristics
- Type: Container ship
- Tonnage: 175,688 GT; 185,000 DWT
- Length: 398 m (1,306 ft)
- Beam: 54 m (177 ft)
- Draft: 16.0 m (52.5 ft)
- Installed power: 87,900 hp at 78 rpm
- Propulsion: MAN B&W 11S90ME-C9.2
- Speed: 23.0 knots (43 km/h) (maximum); 21.0 knots (39 km/h) (cruising)
- Capacity: 17,722 TEU

CMA CGM Kerguelen is a 17,722 TEU very large UK flagged Explorer class container ship owned by the French shipping company CMA CGM. As of August 2015, it was the largest container ship in the fleet of CMA CGM. The ship is named for French-Breton naval officer and explorer Yves-Joseph de Kerguelen-Trémarec. The Captain of the Ship is Captain Lester John Miole MM.

== Construction ==
The container ship CMA CGM Kerguelen was launched in March 2015 and christened in May 2015. The vessel was constructed and projected by Samsung Heavy Industries, according to the latest marine engineering developments and IMO shipping standards. The ship uses the latest developments for economy and safety, and has an increased castle height for increased capacity without changing the dimensions and tonnage.

== Principal Characteristics ==
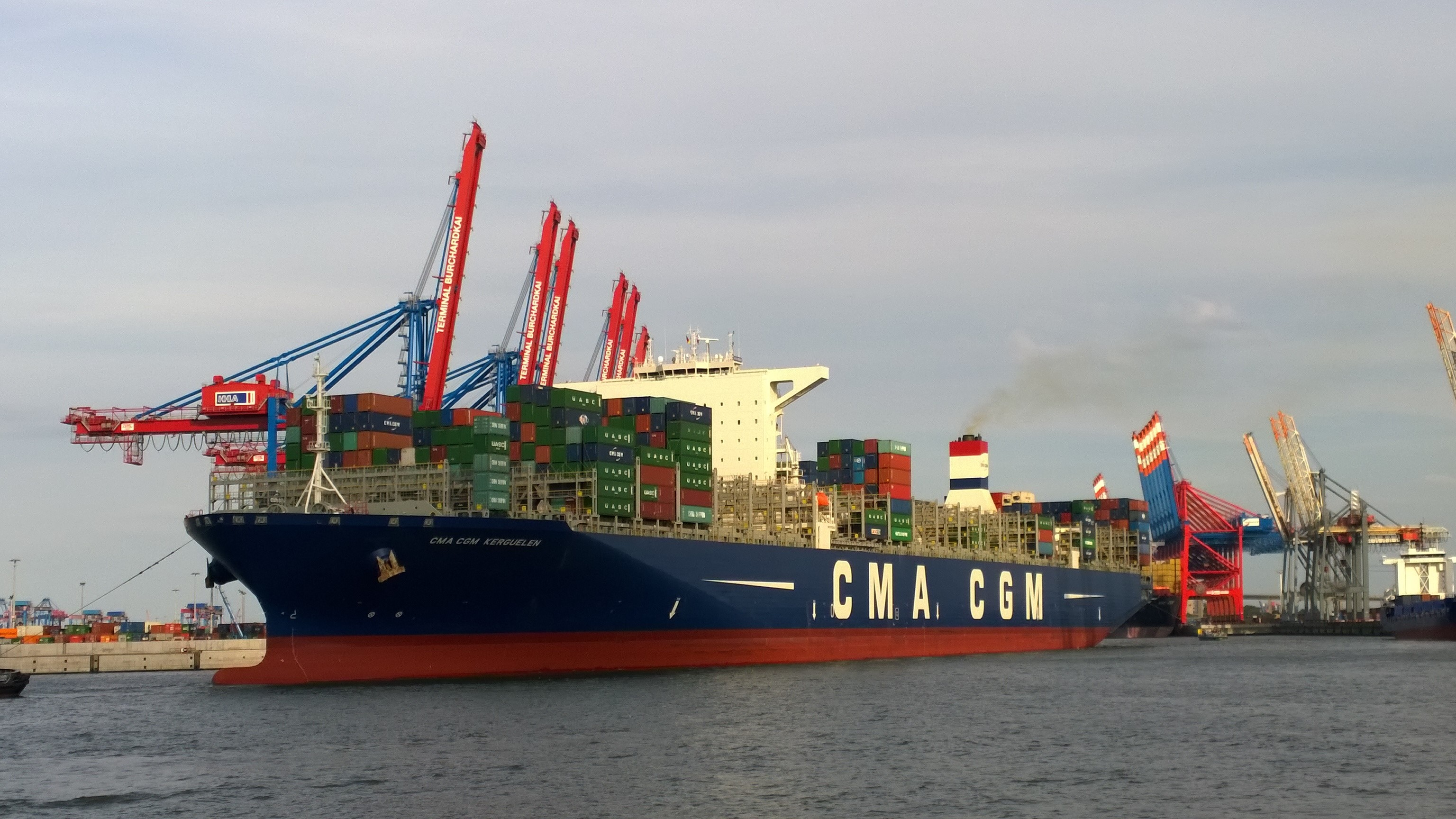
CMA CGM Kerguelen arrives Terminal Burchardkai in Hamburg 1 August 2015

The vessel is among the largest container ships in the world and has overall length of 398 m (1,306 ft), moulded beam of 54 m (177 ft) and maximum draft of 16.0 m (52.5 ft). The cargo ship has deadweight of 185,000 DWT and gross tonnage of 175,000 GT with capacity for 17,722 TEU. The cargo ship has 1,254 reefer points for transportation of temperature controlled containers. With a breadth of 54 metres, it can carry 21 containers across, athwartships.

== Engineering ==
CMA CGM Kerguelen has main engine MAN B&W 11S90ME-C9.2, which has total output power of 87,900 hp at 78 rpm. The engineering on board is equivalent to that of 10 A380 airbus reactors and the electricity, which the generators provide, is enough for a city with 16,000 citizens. The main engine has electronic injection system, which is from latest generation, considerably reduces consumption of fuel (-3% on average) and for oil (-25%). The leading edge rudder improves the vessel's hydrodynamics (optimizing water flow), significantly reducing fuel consumption and CO_{2} emissions. The addition of a bulb on the rudder, innovative technology implemented on the CMA CGM KERGUELEN, helped to improve the energy performance by an additional 4%. Such improvements allow vessel to operate with service speed of 21.0 knots (39 km/h).

== Sister Ships ==
- CMA CGM Georg Forster
- CMA CGM Bougainville

== See also ==
- List of largest container ships
