= CFCN =

CFCN may refer to the radio call signs:

- CFCN-DT, a television station (channel 4) licensed to serve Calgary, Alberta, Canada
- CKMX, a radio station (1060 AM) licensed to serve Calgary, which held the call sign CFCN from 1921 to 1994

It may also refer to:

- CFCN, the Compagnie Franco-Chérifienne de Navigation, a defunct Moroccan shipping line, now incorporated in Compagnie Marocaine de Navigation (Comanav)
