= Unutea Hirshon =

Tahitian politician and activist

Member of the Assembly of French Polynesia
- In office May 6, 2001 – May 4, 2013

Personal details
- Born: 1947 (age 78–79) Papeete, Tahiti, French Polynesia
- Party: Tavini Huiraatira
- Nickname: Tea Hirshon

Unutea "Tea" Hirshon (born 1947) is a Tahitian politician and activist known for her support of French Polynesian independence and her opposition to French nuclear weapons testing in the Pacific. From 2001 to 2013, she served as a member of the Assembly of French Polynesia.

== Biography ==
Unutea Hirshon was born in 1947 in Papeete, French Polynesia. Her mother was from Papeete, and her father was from New York. She was baptized as Séverine but preferred to go by Tea, short for her Tahitian name Unutea.

As a young woman, Hirshon was inspired to fight for Pacific independence and against nuclear activity there after meeting the Tahitian independence leader Pouvanaa a Oopa while visiting France in 1966. As a peace activist, she worked with the Tahitian branch of the Women's International League for Peace and Freedom. She became deeply involved in the fight against nuclear testing in French Polynesia via France's Pacific Experimentation Center, joining the Nuclear Free and Independent Pacific Movement, with historians describing her as part of a coalition of "radical antinuclear activists" in the 1970s. Decades later, she has been described as an "elder in the independence movement of French Polynesia."

Hirshon also became active as a politician, joining the pro-independence Tavini Huiraatira party. She was later described as a "leading political figure" in the party's Union for Democracy coalition. On May 6, 2001, she was elected to the Assembly of French Polynesia, where she served until May 4, 2013. In 2011, she was named first questeur of the Bureau of the Assembly.

From 2005-2006, she served as president of the legislature's Commission of Inquiry into the Consequences of Nuclear Tests in French Polynesia, which produced a two-volume report on the issue. In addition to promoting her central causes of peace and independence, Hirshon raised a variety of other issues during her time in the assembly, including the issue of Tahitian language accessibility in the legislature.

Hirshon has also long been involved in arts and preserving cultural heritage, including through dance, tattoos, music, record production, and exhibits. She also served until 2012 as president of the Board of Directors of Tahiti Nui Television.

== See also ==
- List of peace activists
