= Papeete Market =

Coordinates: 17.5388°S 149.5674°W

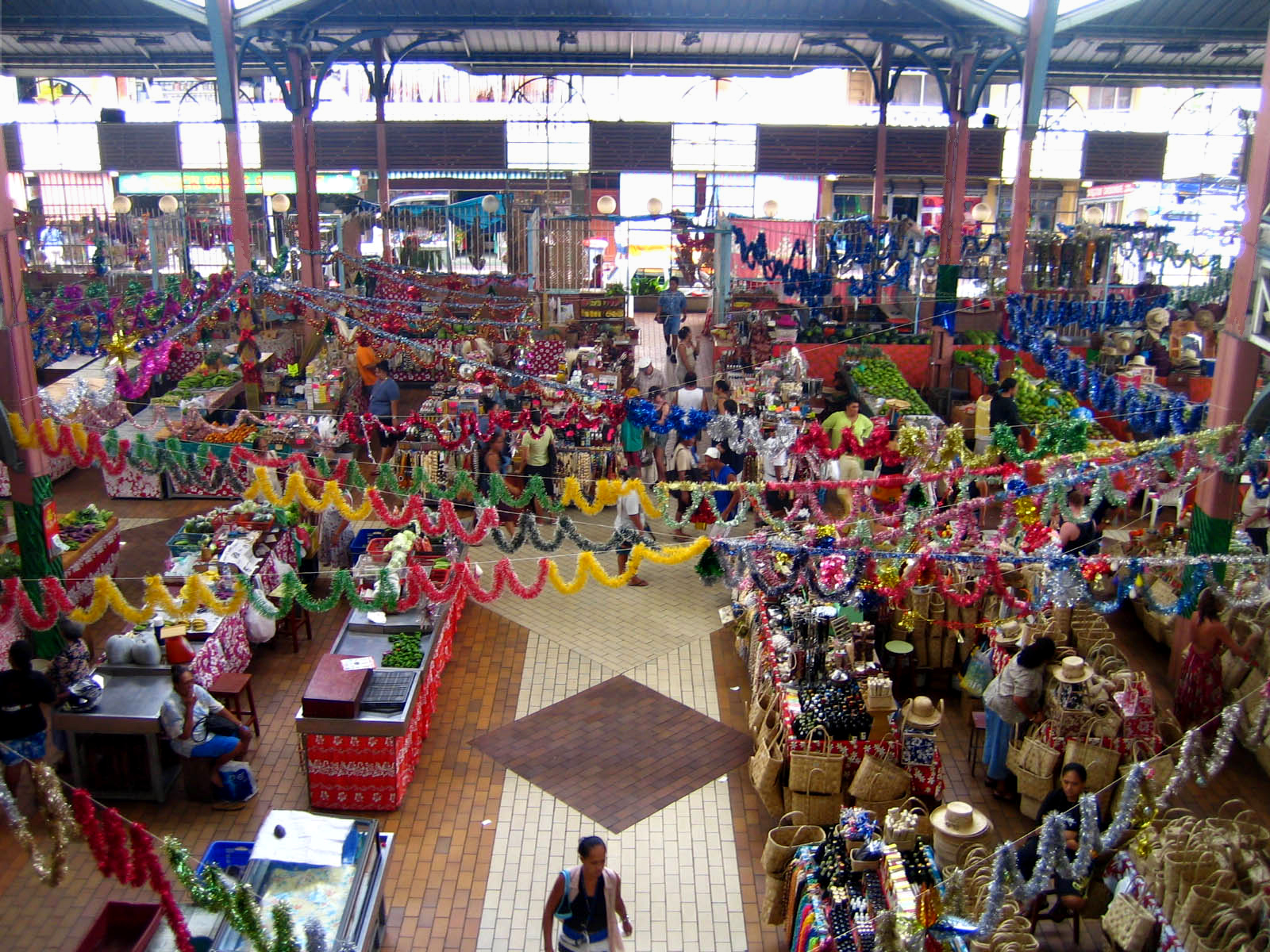

Marché Papeete ("municipal market") or Papeete Market is an extensive market place in Papeete, the capital of Tahiti.

The market sells fruit, vegetables, fish, oils, handicrafts (including hats and handbags) and various souvenir items. Vendors also sell local textiles and handcrafted items such as shell necklaces.
