= French ship Bougainville =

Thirteen ships of the French Navy have been named in honour of Louis Antoine de Bougainville:

- A privateer (1797–1800) captured by HMS Amazon on 14 February 1800, but the prize sank following a collision the next day.
- A privateer captured by the frigate HMS Eurydice in June 1801
- A privateer captured by HMS Scorpion in March 1807.
- A brig captured by the British in 1809
- A brig-aviso (1830–1856)
- A steam aviso (1858–1889)
- An aviso (1875–1920), launched as Allier and renamed in 1887
- A three-masted barque (1902), sunk by a German submarine in 1916
- A mobilised cargo (1914), captured by the Japanese in 1942
- A colonial aviso Bougainville (1929–1940)
- An auxiliary cruiser (ex-Victor Schoelcher) sunk by the British in 1942
- The landing ship dock Bougainville (L9077) (1986)
- The present Bougainville (A622), a D'Entrecasteaux-class multi-mission vessel

== See also ==
- Bougainville-class aviso of the French Navy
