= Wayne Coles-Janess =

Australian producer, writer and director

- Occupation: Producer - Writer - Director

Wayne Coles-Janess was an Australian producer, writer and director of drama and documentary film and TV programs. Based in Melbourne, Australia, he has produced documentaries about frontier places in the country. He has also made some documentaries in several international locations, including during times of war.

== Early life and education ==
Coles-Janess grew up near St. Kilda in Queensland, Australia, where he was the second of four children. His father was a chemical plant operator and his mother a ceramic artist. He started college as an engineering major but quit after a year. He spent time discovering Australia on a 250cc motorcycle. After this he went to the Queensland College of Art, where he graduated from the Film School. He has completed Three Post Graduates in Media, Art and Education.

== Career ==
His documentary Bougainville - Our Island Our Fight (1998) is about the civil war (1988–1998) in Papua New Guinea as the island of Bougainville sought independence. He explored the causes of the conflict, especially disagreement over operations and sharing of profits from the Panguna copper mine. His interview with Francis Ona, leader of the Bougainville Revolutionary Army, was released separately and widely broadcast in 1997.

His documentary Life at the End of the Rainbow (2002) gives an account of people living on the land in the small rural community of Rainbow, at the edge of the Australian desert. Constructed in part from 1940s home movies, it portrays the town's growth and changes among its 500 residents as they struggle to eke out an existence for more than three generations, with global economics and government policy compounding the difficulties of marginal farming. It attained the second-highest rating in ABC’s prestigious True Stories documentary slot. Life at the End of the Rainbow has been shown on the international festival circuit, where it has won numerous awards.

== List of films ==
- In the Shadow of the Palms
- Bougainville – Our Island Our Fight
- Life at the End of the Rainbow
- On the Border of Hopetown
- Big City of Dreams

Coles-Janess, Wayne (1997). Bougainville "Sandline". © ipso-facto Productions, screened on ABC. Coles-Janess, Wayne (1994). Bougainville "Broken Promises" © ipso-facto Productions, screened on ABC. Coles-Janess, Wayne (1997). Bougainville "Inside Bougainville" © ipso-facto Productions, screened on ABC.

The film, Bougainville - Our Island Our Fight, was notable for covering the Bougainville Conflict. It was picked up by SBS Television and went onto screen at approximately 50 International Film Festivals and Winning a number of Awards.
