= Andy Tupaia =

Andy Tupaia (born 29 October 1958) is a French Polynesian musician. He composes songs, writes lyrics and performs his own music.

Tupaia was born in Papeete. At the age of 15 he left school and moved to Mo'orea, where he worked at the Club Med resort. After returning to Tahiti he recorded his first album, Music Api, with the assistance of his childhood friend, Guy Roche. He established his own record label, Oehau Music, and then worked with other people's music. Since 2006, he has worked in the radio station Taui FM.

== Discography ==
- Music Api (1981)
- Come to Tahiti (1983)
- Touche à tout (1987)
- Homage to Paul Gauguin (1990)
- For Tho' I Love (1998)
- Vanilla Island (2001)
