= CMA CGM Bougainville =

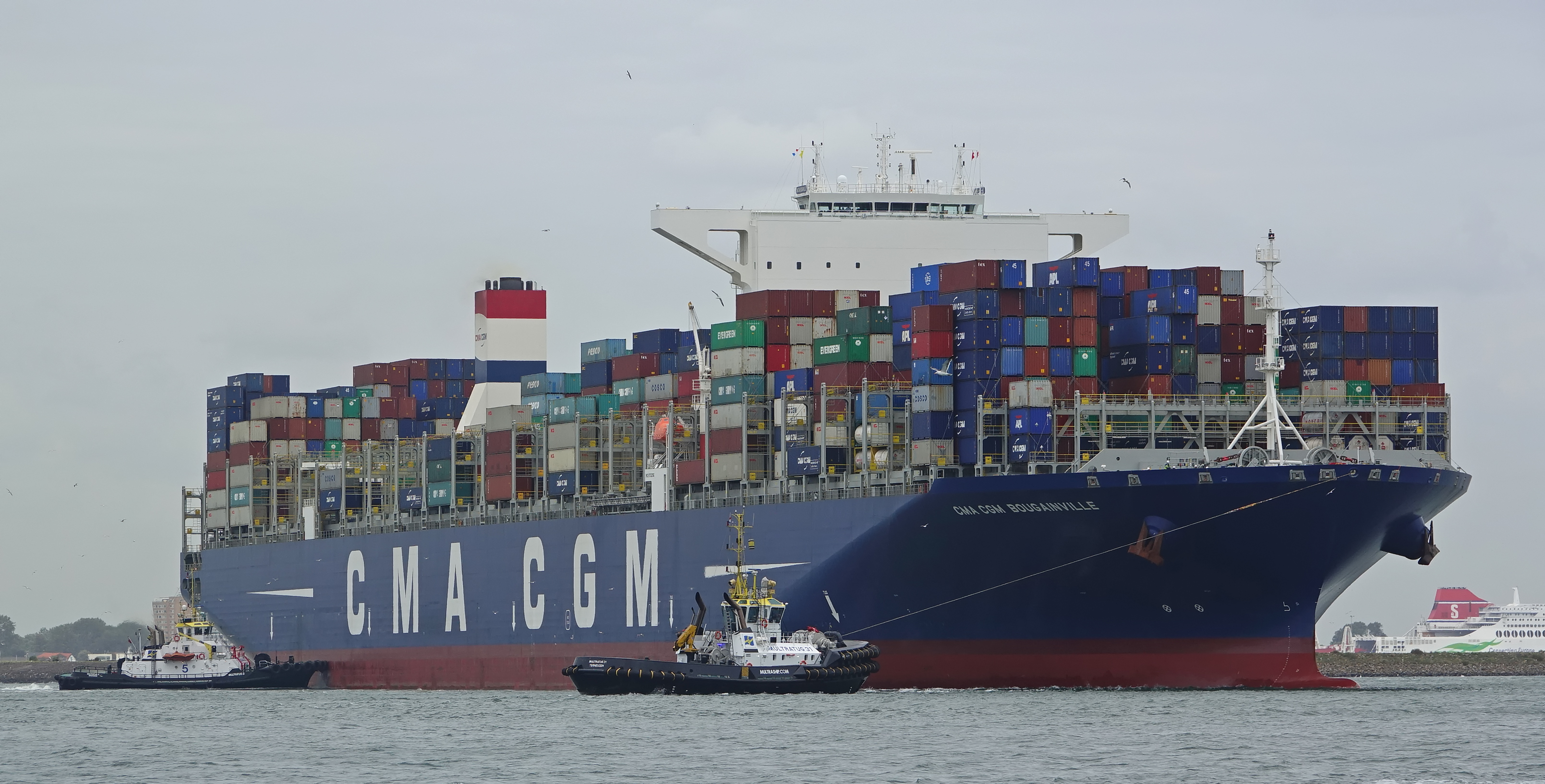

History

France
- Name: CMA CGM Bougainville
- Owner: CMA CGM
- Operator: CMA CGM
- Port of registry: Marseille
- Route: Northern Europe to East Asia
- Builder: Samsung Heavy Industries
- Completed: August 2015
- Maiden voyage: September 2015
- Identification: Call sign: FIVD; IMO number: 9702156; MMSI number: 228067900
- Status: Operational

General characteristics
- Type: Container ship
- Tonnage: 175,000 GT; 185,000 DWT
- Length: 398 m (1,306 ft)
- Beam: 54 m (177 ft)
- Draft: 16.1 m (53 ft)
- Installed power: 64,000 kW
- Propulsion: MAN B&W 11S90ME-C9.2
- Speed: 20.5 knots (38 km/h) (maximum); 19.5 knots (36 km/h) (cruising)
- Capacity: 18,000 TEU

CMA CGM Bougainville is container ship, built in 2015 by Samsung Heavy Industries for CMA CGM on French Asia Line (FAL). The vessel was the largest container carrier operating under the flag of France. The vessel is the largest container ship in the world at the time of her launch in August 2015, having maximum capacity for 18,000 TEU with 1,254 reefer plugs.

== Design and engineering ==
The boxship CMA CGM Bougainville together with her five sister-vessels is the flagship for the French container line CMA CGM. The ship has overall length of 398 m (1,306 ft), width of 54 m (177 ft) and summer draft of 16.1 m (53 ft). The deadweight of the container carrier is 185,000 DWT, while the gross tonnage is 175,000 GT. The boxship CMA CGM Bougainville has maximum capacity for 18,000 TEU with 1,254 reefer plugs.

The CMA BGM Bougainville is the first container ship in the world to deploy the TRAXENS technology, a system that monitors and tracks containers throughout the journey of the ship. The TRAXENS technology, developed by a French startup company, make use of built-in relay antennas in each container to communicate with the communication hub of the ship.

== Engineering ==
The container ship CMA CGM Bougainville is driven by modern low-speed engine MAN B&W 11S90ME-C9.2, which has total output power of 64,000 kW.

== See also ==
- List of largest container ships
- Largest container shipping companies
