= Bougainville – Our Island Our Fight =

1998 Australian documentary film by Wayne Coles-Janess

Bougainville: Our Island, Our Fight
- Directed by: Wayne Coles-Janess
- Produced by: Wayne Coles-Janess
- Edited by: Wayne Coles-Janess
- Release date: 1998
- Country: Australia

Bougainville – Our Island Our Fight is a 1998 Australian documentary film. It was produced and directed by Wayne Coles-Janess.

The film focuses on the guerrillas of the Bougainville Revolutionary Army in Papua New Guinea as they fight against the Bougainville Copper company and Papuan government forces. The guerrillas believe they are fighting to defend their independence and the local environment on the island of Bougainville. This film is notable for its subject matter as most Western media was not reporting the Bougainville Civil War.

== Synopsis ==
The Island of Bougainville is located in the Solomon Islands archipelago but is a territory of Papua New Guinea. Beginning in the late 1980s, the people of this Island have fought a guerrilla war with salvaged and recovered World War II weaponry against government forces supplied with more modern equipment. The government has instituted a complete economic blockade of the island in addition to an extended campaign of aerial bombardment and violence against its civilian population.

Bougainville – Our Island, Our Fight depicts the world of Bougainville residents as they leave their traditional coastal society to take refuge from a dangerous military conflict. An explanation of the conflict's causes reveals that the installation of an open cut copper mine at Panguna had initially offered promise of economic prosperity for the region. Bougainville residents eventually determined that the mine project entailed significant ecological damage and social exploitation. Through interviews, "Bougainvillians" discuss their initial recognition of the consequences of this mine, which led to the poisoning of their water supply and the degradation of farmlands and jungle habitat. Later scenes show the difficulties which Bougainville residents face due to the naval blockade of their island. The blockade prevents them from receiving medical and humanitarian aid, leading to declining health and the emergence of leprosy cases. Some supplies are smuggled from the Solomon Islands.

== Production ==
The filmmaker Wayne Coles-Janess and his crew violated the Papua New Guinea government blockade. He had to be smuggled onto and off the island. The film includes the first and only television interview with the BRA President Francis Ona and the defecting Papua New Guinea officer, BRA General Sam Kouna.

== See also ==
- The Coconut Revolution
