= Louis Antoine de Bougainville =

French military officer and explorer (1729–1811)

Louis Antoine de Bougainville Comte de Bougainville FRS
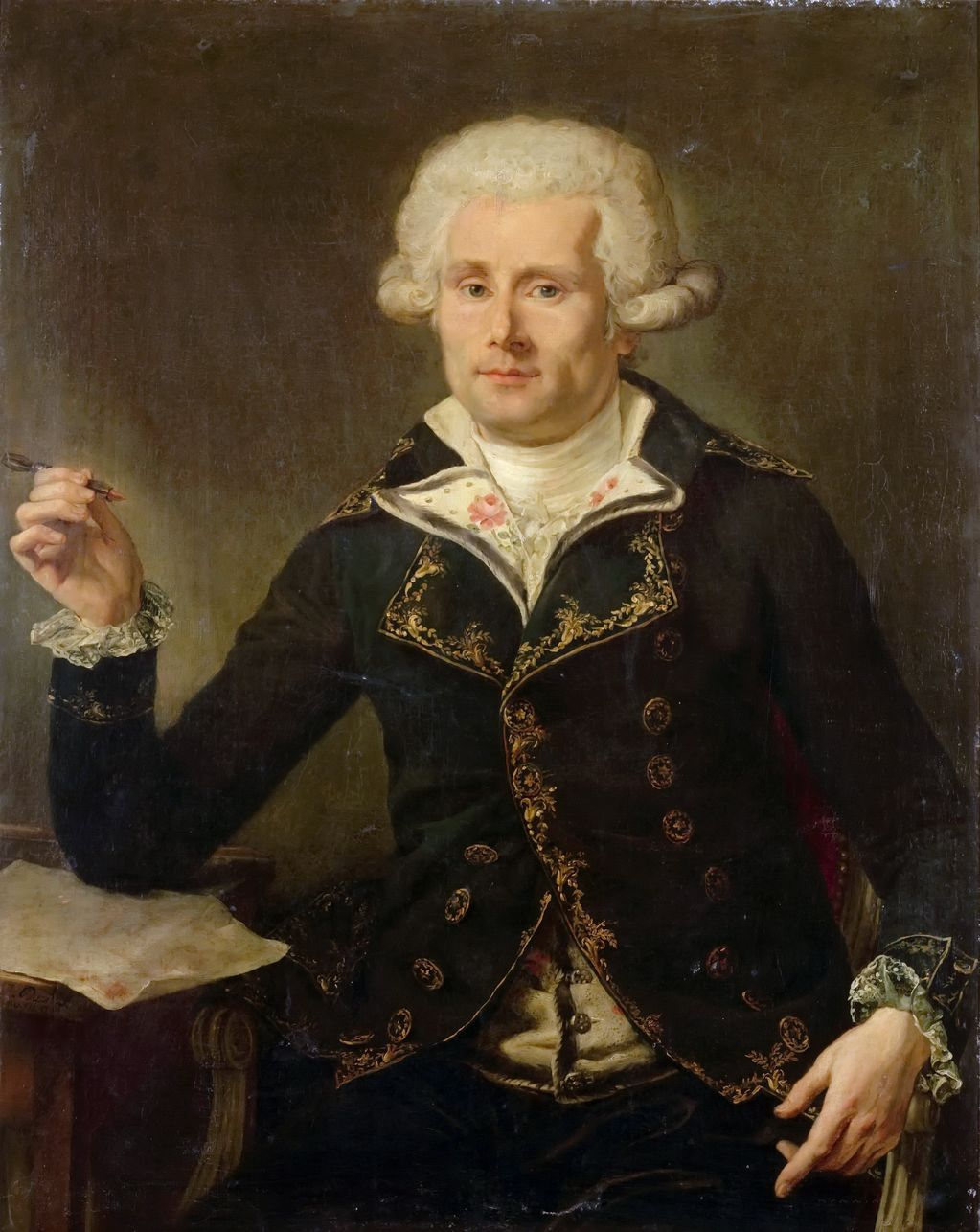
- Portrait by Joseph Ducreux, 1790
- Born: 12 November 1729; Paris, France
- Died: 31 August 1811 (aged 81); Paris, France
- Burial place: The Panthéon, Paris
- Education: University of Paris
- Spouse: Flore de Montendre
- Children: 4, including Hyacinthe de Bougainville
- Military career
- Allegiance: France
- Branch: French Army; French Navy
- Service years: 1750–1763 (Army); 1763–1811 (Navy)
- Rank: Maréchal de camp (Army); Vice Admiral (Navy)
- Conflicts: French and Indian War; Battle of Fort Oswego; Siege of Fort William Henry; Battle of the Plains of Abraham; American Revolutionary War
- Awards: Order of Saint Louis; Legion of Honour

Louis-Antoine, Comte de Bougainville (/ˈbuːɡənvɪl/; French: [buɡɛ̃vil]; 12 November 1729 – 31 August 1811) was a French military officer and explorer. After having served in the Seven Years' War and the American Revolutionary War, Bougainville later gained fame for his expeditions, including a circumnavigation of the globe in a scientific expedition in 1763, the first recorded settlement on the Falkland Islands, and voyages into the Pacific Ocean. Bougainville Island of Papua New Guinea as well as the flowering plant Bougainvillea are named in his honour.

== Early life ==
Bougainville was born in Paris on November 12, 1729, the youngest of three children to Marie-Françoise d'Arboulin and Pierre-Yves de Bougainville. His father had entered into the minor nobility due to his service as notary for the state and his mother died when he was five. He was then raised by his older brother Jean-Pierre with the help of an aunt. His father had pushed his sons to also take up a legal career and Bougainville enrolled in the University of Paris. While here, he took an interest in philosophy and mathematics, studying under mathematician Jean le Rond d'Alembert.

At the age of twenty-five, Bougainville published the first volume of his treatise on integral calculus, Traité de calcul intégral. His work was presented to the French Academy of Sciences and he received the patronage of Academy member and War Minister, the Comte d’Argenson. Several years later in 1756 he published the second volume and that same year he was made a member of the Royal Society of London while in England on a diplomatic mission.

After graduating, Bougainville decided on a military career rather than a legal one and in 1750 he entered the French Army in the corps of Musketeers of the Guard. He was later made adjutant of the Régiment de Picardie and was recommended to General François de Chevert, serving as his aide-de-camp. In October 1755 he was appointed as the secretary of Maréchal de Lévis-Mirepoix on his diplomatic mission to London before returning to France in February 1756. He continued to serve under the command of Cheveret and was promoted to lieutenant in the Régiment d’Apchon.

== Seven Years' War (French and Indian War) ==
In 1756, Bougainville was stationed in Canada as captain of dragoons and aide-de-camp to the Marquis de Montcalm. He took an active part in the capture of Fort Oswego in 1756 and the 1757 Battle of Fort William Henry. He was wounded in 1758 at the successful defense of Fort Carillon. He sailed back to France the following winter, under orders from the marquis to obtain additional military resources for the colony. During this crossing, he continued to learn about the ways of the sea, skills that would later serve him well. Having distinguished himself in the war against Britain, Bougainville was rewarded with the Cross of St Louis and promoted to colonel. When he returned to Canada the following year, he had gained few supplies. The metropolitan officials had decided that, "When the house is on fire, one does not worry about the stables".

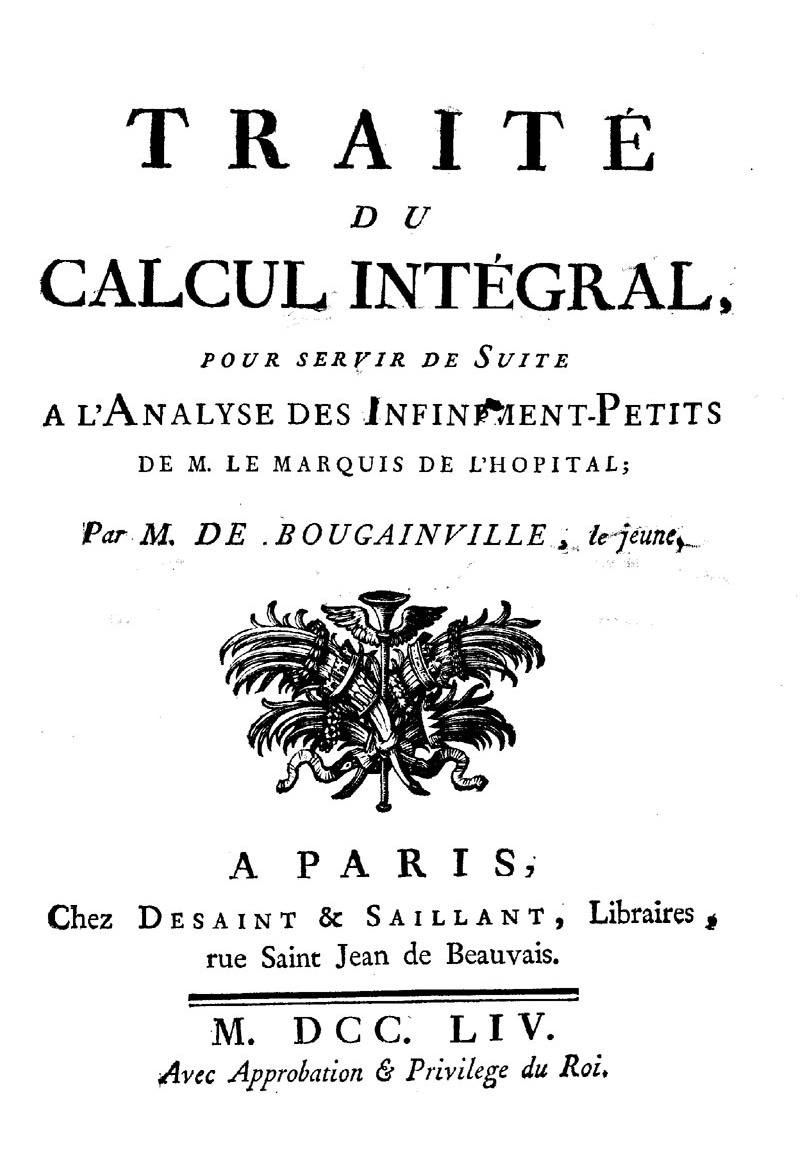
Bougainville was recognized by the Royal Society of London for Traité du calcul intégral, his two volume work on integral calculus.

During the pivotal year of 1759 (see Seven Years' War and French and Indian War), Bougainville participated in the defence of fortified Quebec, the capital of New France. With a small elite troop under his command, among which were the Grenadiers and the Volontaires à cheval, he patrolled the north shore of the St. Lawrence River, upstream from the city; he prevented the British several times from landing and cutting communications with Montreal. He did not have sufficient time, however, to rally his troops and attack the British rear when they successfully ascended the Plains of Abraham and attacked Quebec on 13 September.

Following the death of the Marquis de Montcalm and the fall of Quebec on 18 September 1759 – after the colonel's aborted attempt to resupply the besieged city – Bougainville was dispatched to the western front by his new commanding officer, the Chevalier de Lévis. He attempted to stop the three-pronged attack against Montréal from his entrenchments at Île-aux-Noix. He was among the officers who accompanied Lévis to Saint Helen's Island off Montreal for the last French stand in North America before the general capitulation of September 1760. Of the war, Bougainville wrote in his journal: "It is an abominable kind of war. The very air we breathe is contagious of insensibility and hardness".

Shipped back to Europe along with the other French officers, all deprived of military honors by the victors, Bougainville was prohibited by the terms of surrender from any further active duty against the British. He spent the remaining years of the Seven Years' War (1761 to 1763) as a diplomat, helping to negotiate the Treaty of Paris. Under this France ceded most of New France east of the Mississippi River to Great Britain.

== Naval career ==
=== First French circumnavigation ===
Map of the trip with French names as they stood at the times

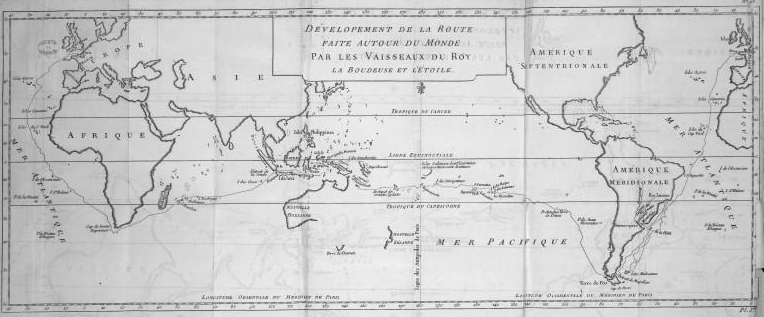
Voyage autour du monde, Paris, 1772

==== Îles Malouines settlement ====
After the peace, the French decided to colonise the "Îles Malouines" (the Falkland Islands) in the South Atlantic. These islands were at that time almost unknown. At his own expense, Bougainville undertook the task of resettling Acadians who had been deported to France by the British because of their refusal to sign loyalty oaths.

On 15 September 1763, Bougainville set out from France with the frigate L'Aigle (Eagle) (captained by Nicolas Pierre Duclos-Guyot) and the sloop Le Sphinx (Sphinx) (captained by François Chenard de la Giraudais). This expedition included the naturalist and writer Antoine-Joseph Pernety (known as Dom Pernety), the priest and chronicler accompanying the expedition, together with the engineer and geographer Lhuillier de la Serre.

The expedition arrived in late January 1764 in French Bay (later renamed Berkeley Sound) in the Falkland Islands. They landed at Port Louis, named after King Louis XV. A formal ceremony of possession of the Islands was held on 5 April 1764, after which Bougainville and Pernety returned to France. Louis XV formally ratified possession on 12 September 1764.

Although the French colony did not number more than 150 people, for financial motivations (Bougainville having paid for the expeditions) and diplomatic reasons (Spain feared that the Falklands would become a rear base to attack her Peruvian gold), Bougainville was ordered by the French government to dismantle his colony and sell it to the Spanish. Bougainville received 200,000 francs in Paris and an additional 500,000 francs in Buenos Aires. Spain agreed to maintain the colony in Port Louis, thus preventing Britain from claiming title to the islands. Spain had claimed dominion before the French settlement in association with its colonies on the mainland. On 31 January 1767 at Río de la Plata, Bougainville met Don Felipe Ruiz Puente, commanding the frigate La Esmeralda and La Liebre ("the Hare") and future governor of Islas Malvinas, to transfer possession and evacuate the French population.

Bougainville wrote:

It was not before 1766, that the English sent a colony to settle in Port de la Croisade, which they had named Port Egmont; and captain Macbride, of the Jason frigate, came to our settlement the same year, in the beginning of December. He pretended that these parts belonged to his Britannic majesty, threatened to land by force, if he should be any longer refused that liberty, visited the governor, and sailed away again the same day.

Îles Malouines settlement
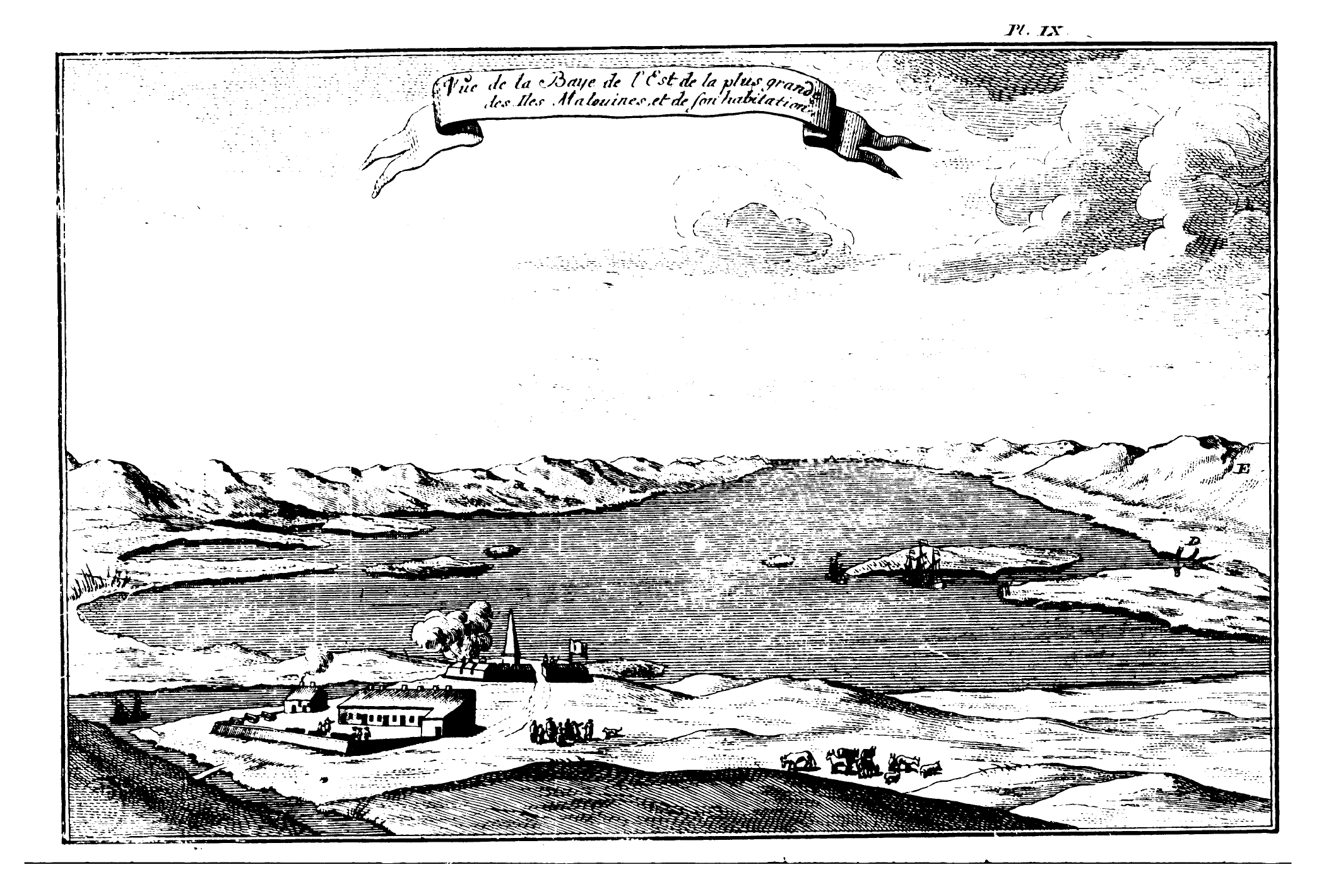
Port St. Louis as established by Bougainville (Dom Pernety, 1769).

Port St. Louis (Federico Lacroix, 1841).

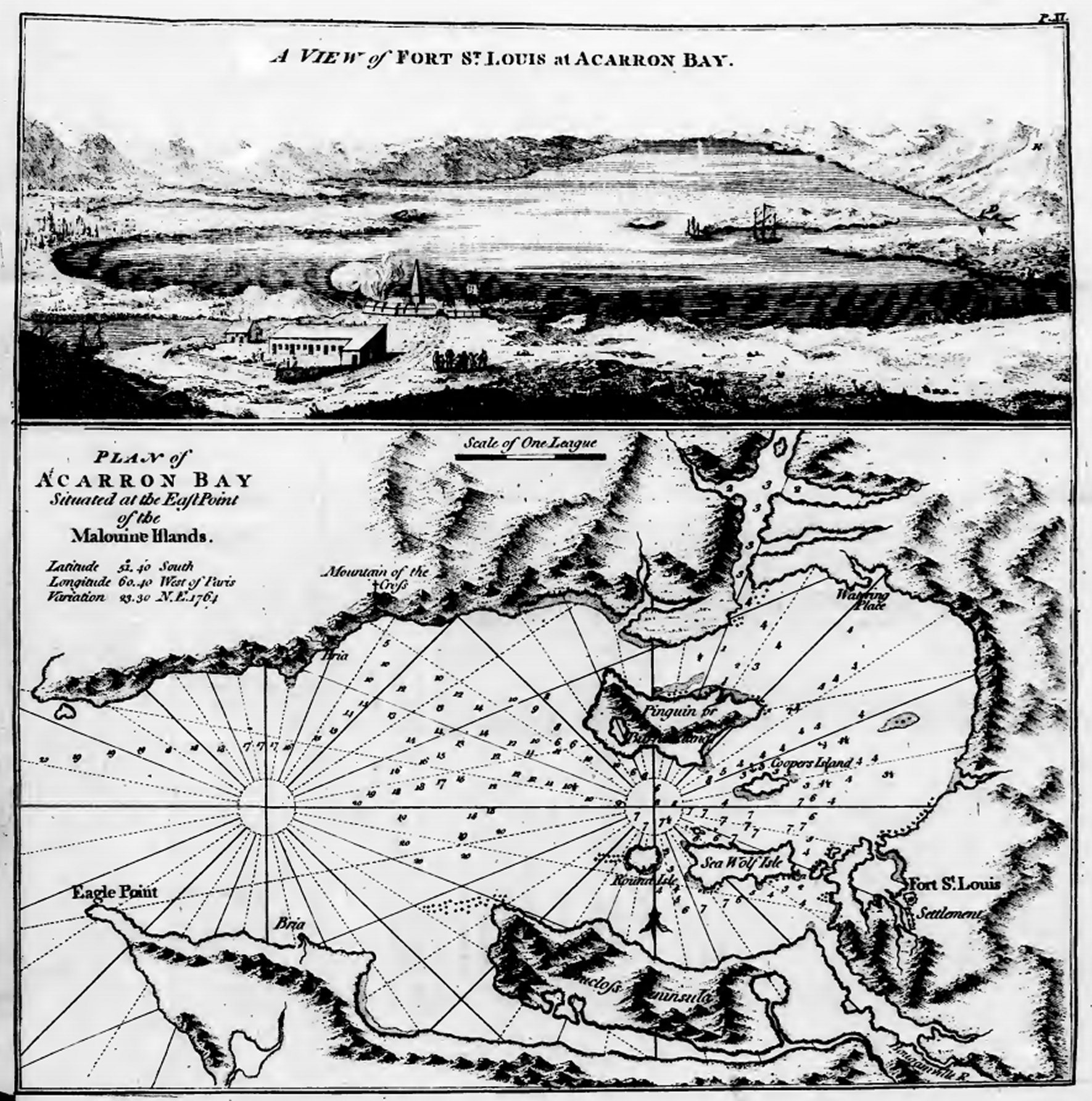
Port St. Louis (Dom Pernety, 1769).

==== Circumnavigation ====
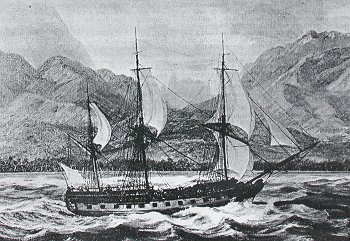
The Boudeuse, of Louis Antoine de Bougainville

In 1766, Bougainville received from Louis XV permission to circumnavigate the globe. He would become the 14th navigator, and the first Frenchman, to sail around the world (though some are led to believe that Richard of Normandie, who was part of the fleet of Ferdinand Magellan during his circumnavigation, was the first Frenchman to do so). Completion of his mission bolstered the prestige of France following its defeats during the Seven Years' War. This was the first expedition to circumnavigate the globe with professional naturalists and geographers aboard.

Bougainville left Nantes on 15 November 1766 with two ships: Boudeuse (captain : Nicolas Pierre Duclos-Guyot) and the Étoile (commanded by François Chenard de la Giraudais). This was a large expedition, with a crew of 214 aboard Boudeuse and 116 aboard Étoile. Included in the party was the botanist Philibert Commerçon (who named the flower Bougainvillea) and his valet. Commerson's valet was later revealed to be a woman Jeanne Barret (also Baré or Baret); she would become the first woman known to circumnavigate the globe. Other notable people on this expedition were the astronomer Pierre-Antoine Veron; the surgeon of Boudeuse Dr. Louis-Claude Laporte; the surgeon of the Étoile Dr. François Vives; the engineer and cartographer aboard the Étoile Charles Routier de Romainville; and the writer and historian Louis-Antoine Starot de Saint-Germain.

==== Tahiti ====
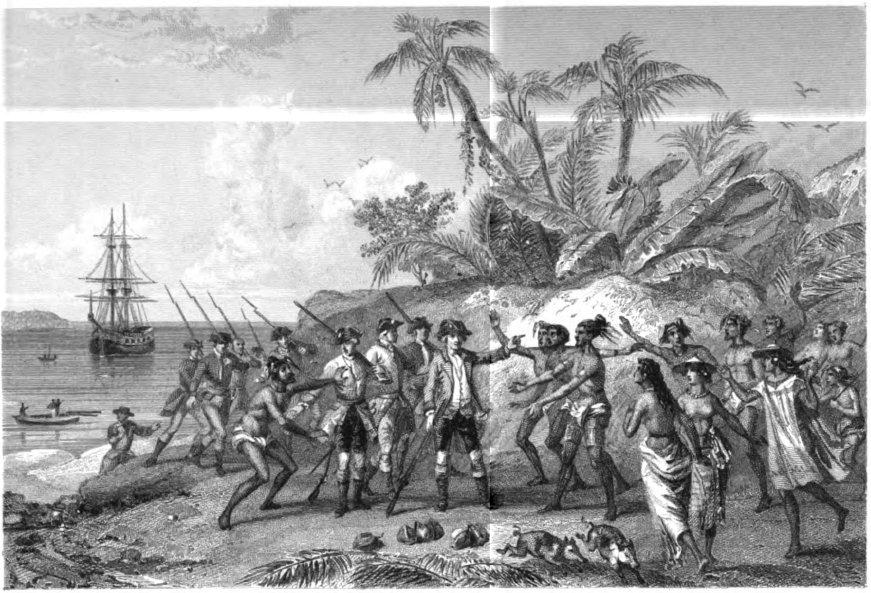
Bougainville reaching Tahiti

He saw islands of the Tuamotu group on the following 22 March, on 2 April saw the peak of Mehetia and visited the island of Otaheite shortly after. He narrowly missed becoming their discoverer; a previous visit and claim had been made by British explorer Samuel Wallis in HMS Dolphin less than a year previously. Bougainville claimed the island for France and named it New Cythera. During this part of his expedition, one of his crew members, Jeanne Barret, was discovered to be a woman and confessed.

His expedition left Tahiti and sailed westward to southern Samoa and the New Hebrides, then on sighting Espiritu Santo turned west still looking for the Southern Continent. On 4 June he almost ran into heavy breakers and had to change course to the north and east. He had almost found the Great Barrier Reef. He sailed through what is now known as the Solomon Islands but, because of the hostility of the people there, avoided landing. He named Bougainville Island for himself. The expedition was attacked by people from New Ireland so the French expedition made for the Moluccas. At Batavia, they received news of Wallis and Carteret who had preceded Bougainville in discovering Tahiti.

==== Return to France ====
On 16 March 1769, the expedition completed its circumnavigation and arrived at Saint-Malo. It had lost only seven of its 340 crew, an extremely low level of casualties. This result was considered a credit to the enlightened management of the expedition by Bougainville.

Bougainville brought to France a Tahitian named Ahutoru who volunteered to come with him. In France, Bougainville introduced Ahutoru to the high society, including introducing him to the King and Queen at Versailles. Bougainville also underwrote part of the costs for Ahutoru's return to Tahiti after a two-year absence. The voyage took place under Marion Dufresne, but Ahutoru died en route of smallpox in October 1771.

==== Voyage autour du monde ====
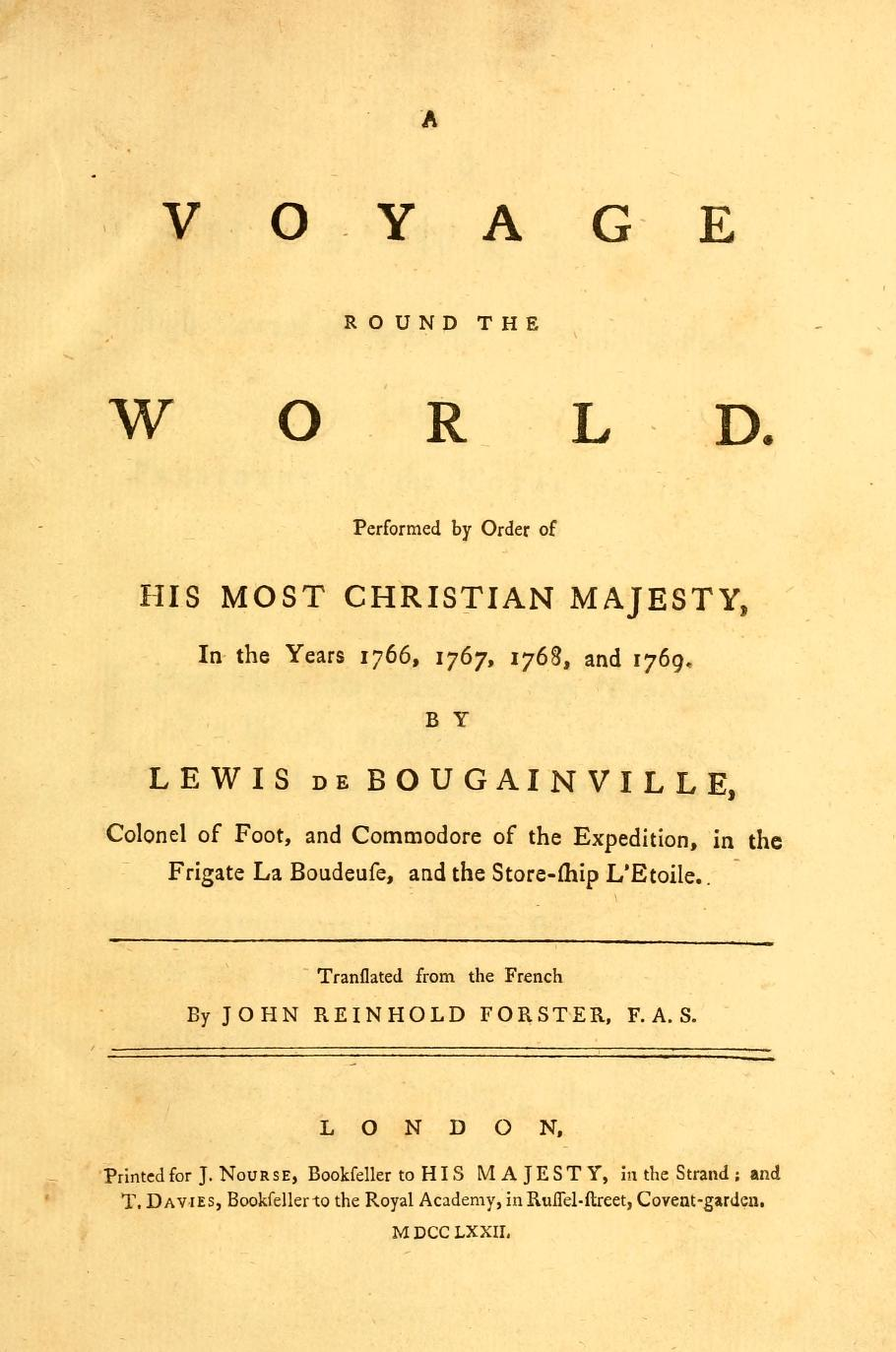
Cover page of the English edition of Bougainville's travelogue (1772).

In 1771, Bougainville published his travel log from the expedition under the title Le voyage autour du monde, par la frégate La Boudeuse, et la flûte L'Étoile (a.k.a. Voyage autour du monde and A Voyage Around the World). The book describes the geography, biology and anthropology of Argentina (then a Spanish colony), Patagonia, Tahiti, and Indonesia (then a Dutch colony). The book was a sensation, especially the description of Tahitian society. Bougainville described it as an earthly paradise where men and women lived in blissful innocence, far from the corruption of civilization.

Bougainville's descriptions powerfully expressed the concept of the noble savage, influencing the utopian thoughts of philosophers such as Jean-Jacques Rousseau before the advent of the French Revolution. Denis Diderot's book Supplément au voyage de Bougainville retells the story of Bougainville's landing on Tahiti, narrated by an anonymous reader to one of his friends. Diderot used his fictional approach, including a description of the Tahitians as noble savages, to criticize Western ways of living and thinking.

=== American Revolutionary War ===
After several years of absence, Bougainville again accepted a naval command. In 1777, he was captain of the 74-gun Bien-Aimé. He took part in the War of American Independence, playing a crucial part in the French victory at the Battle of the Chesapeake.

At the Battle of the Saintes, Bougainville commanded the 80-gun Auguste. He managed to rally eight ships of his own division, and bringing them safely into Saint Eustace after the defeat of Comte de Grasse. He was promoted to chef d'escadre. When he re-entered the French Army, he was commissioned as maréchal de camp.

After Peace of Paris in 1783, Bougainville returned to Paris. He obtained the place of associate of the Académie de Marine. He proposed a voyage of discovery to the North Pole, but did not gain the support of the French government.

=== Promotion and retirement ===
In 1787, he became a member of the French Academy of Sciences. He obtained the rank of vice-admiral in 1791.

In 1794, having escaped from the Reign of Terror, he retired to his estate in Normandy. Returning to Paris, he was one of the founding members of the Bureau des Longitudes. In 1799, Napoleon Bonaparte, at the time serving as First Consul of the Republic, made him a senator. He died in Paris on 31 August 1811, during Napoleon's reign of the First French Empire.

The heart of Louis Antoine De Bougainville is buried at the Cimetière du Calvaire in Paris, the rest of his body is buried at the Panthéon, also in Paris.

== Legacy and honors ==
- Bougainville's name is given to the largest eastern island of Papua New Guinea; and to the strait which divides it from the island of Choiseul. It is also applied to the strait between Mallicollo and Espiritu Santo islands of the New Hebrides group. In the Falklands, Port Louis, and "Isla Bougainville" (Lively Island's Spanish name) commemorate him.
- The genus of South American climbing shrubs with colorful bracts, Bougainvillea, is named after him.
- 1804, he was made a Grand Officier de la Légion d'honneur in 1804.
- 1808, Napoleon gave him the title of count (the Comte de Bougainville).
- Thirteen ships of the French Navy have been named in his honor, see French ship Bougainville.
Legacy
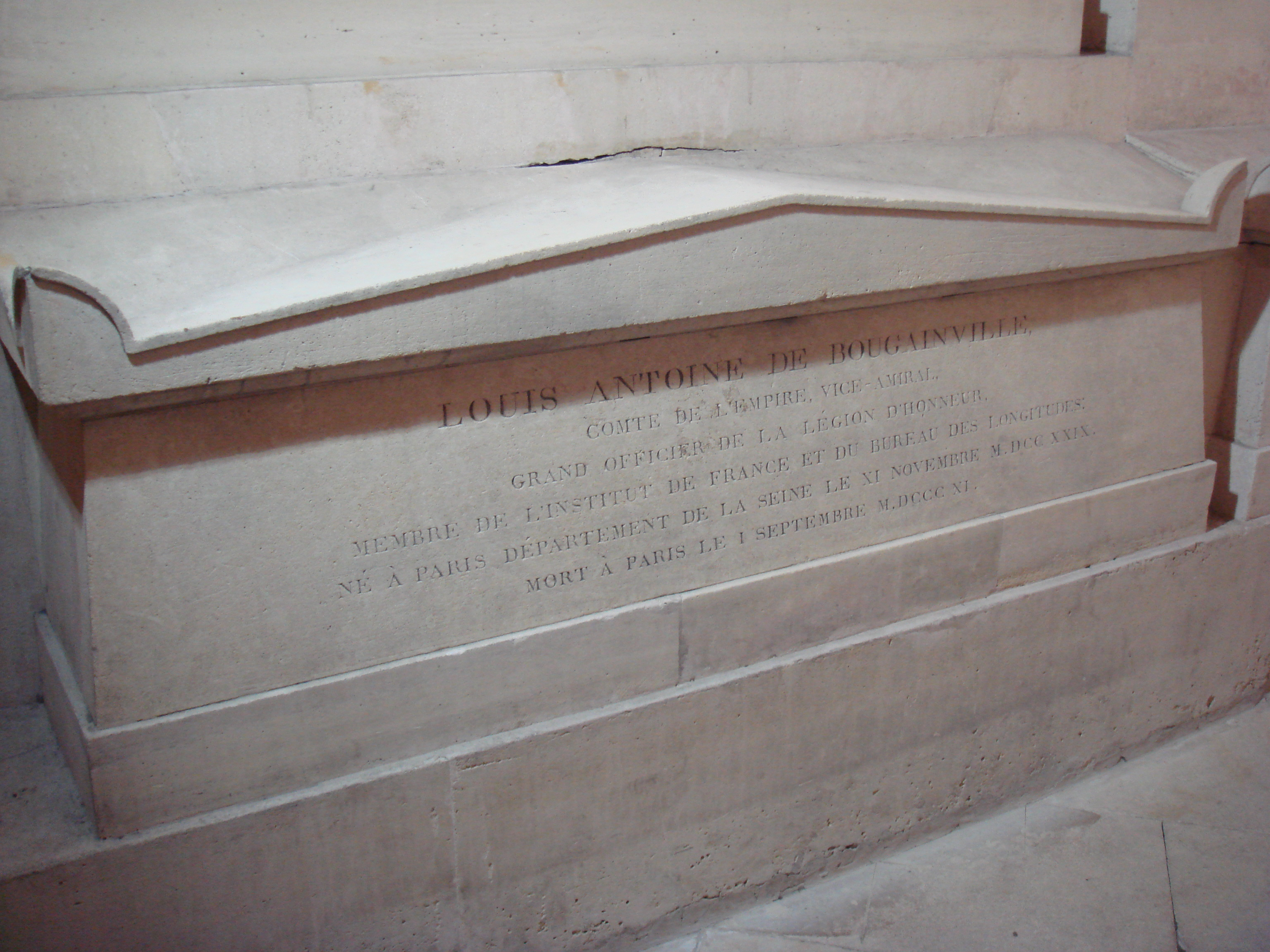
Tomb of Louis Antoine de Bougainville, at the Panthéon in Paris

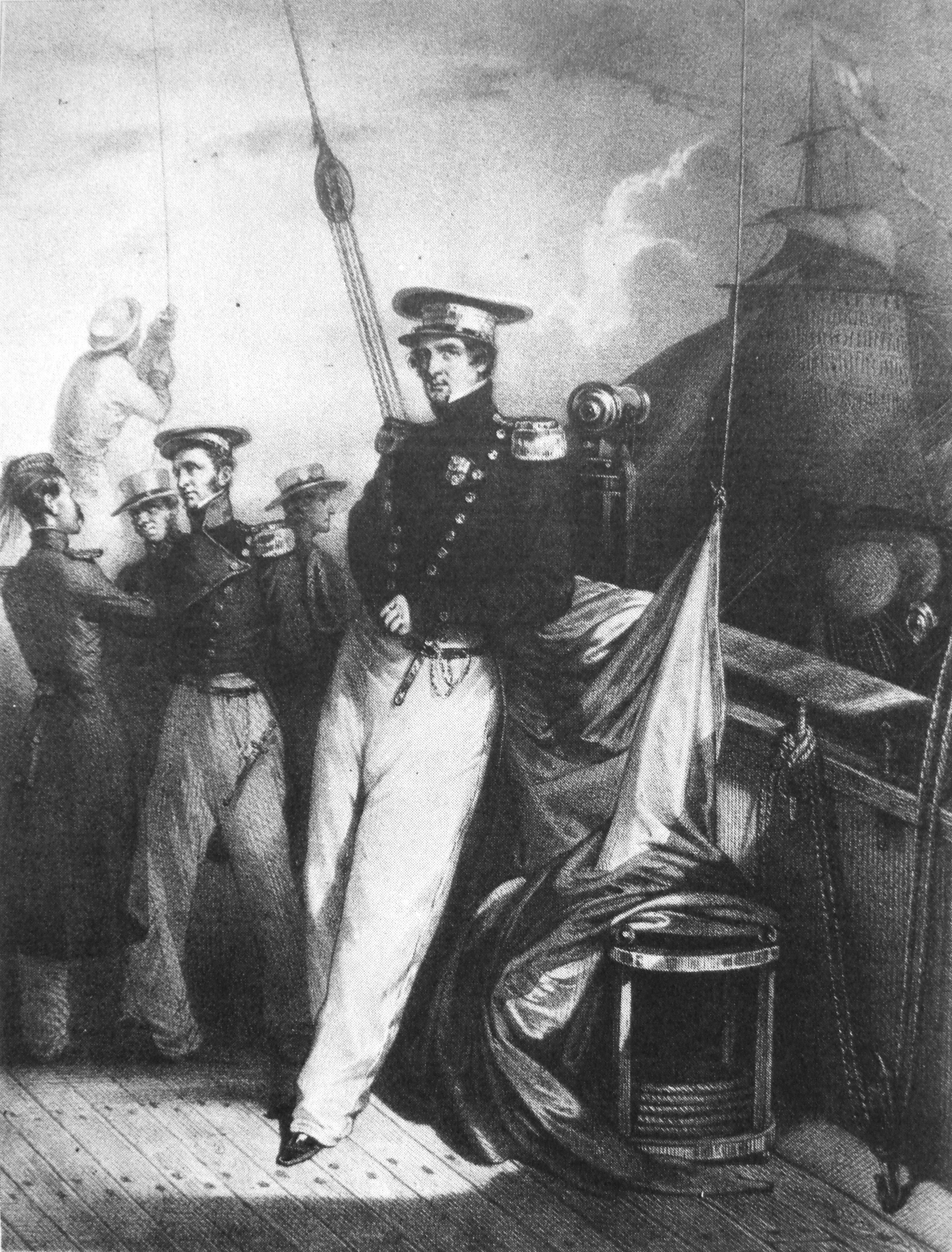
Hyacinthe de Bougainville, also a sailor and circumnavigator, was the son of Louis Antoine de Bougainville

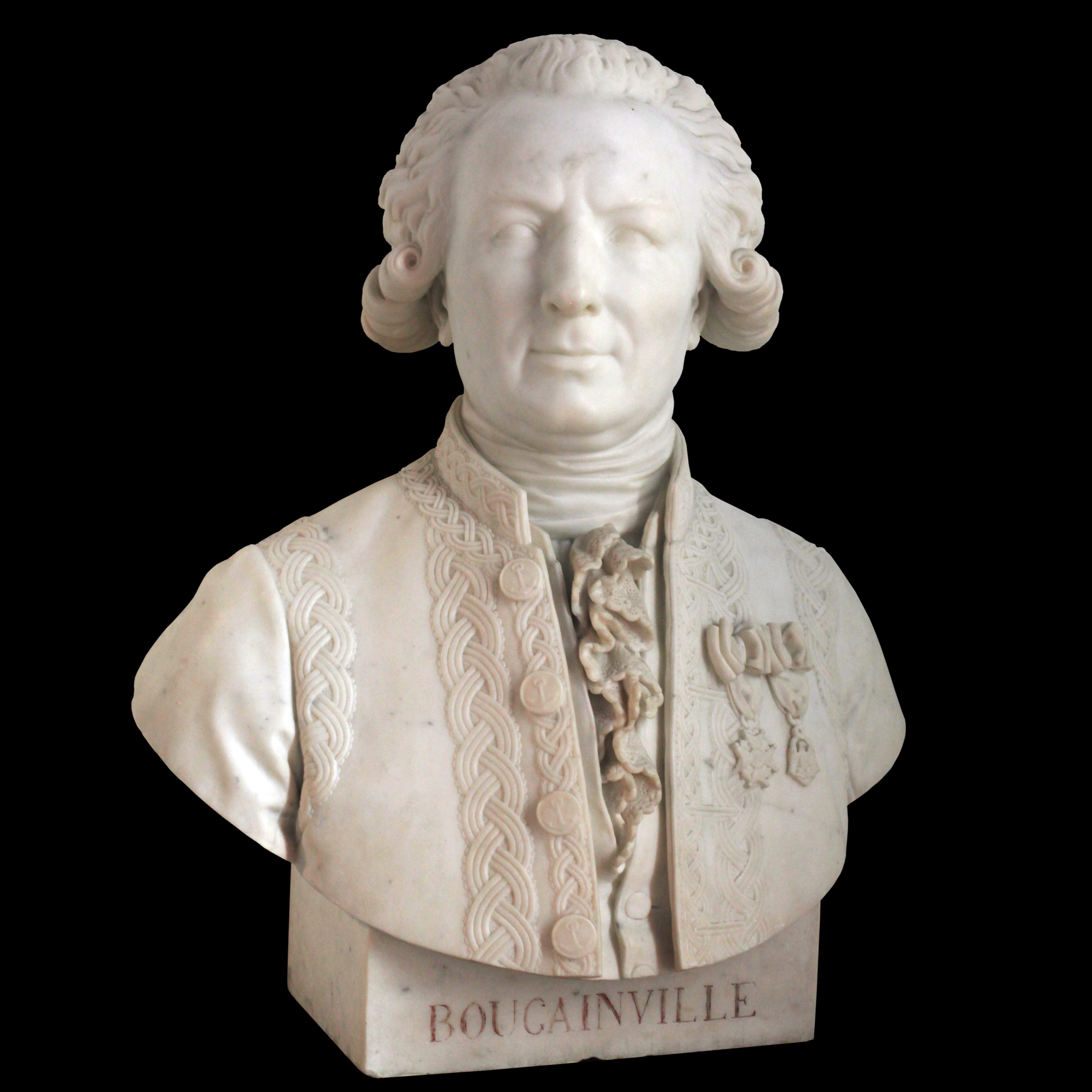
Posthumous bust of Bougainville, made in 1831 by Bosio Astyanax Scevola

== Notes and references ==
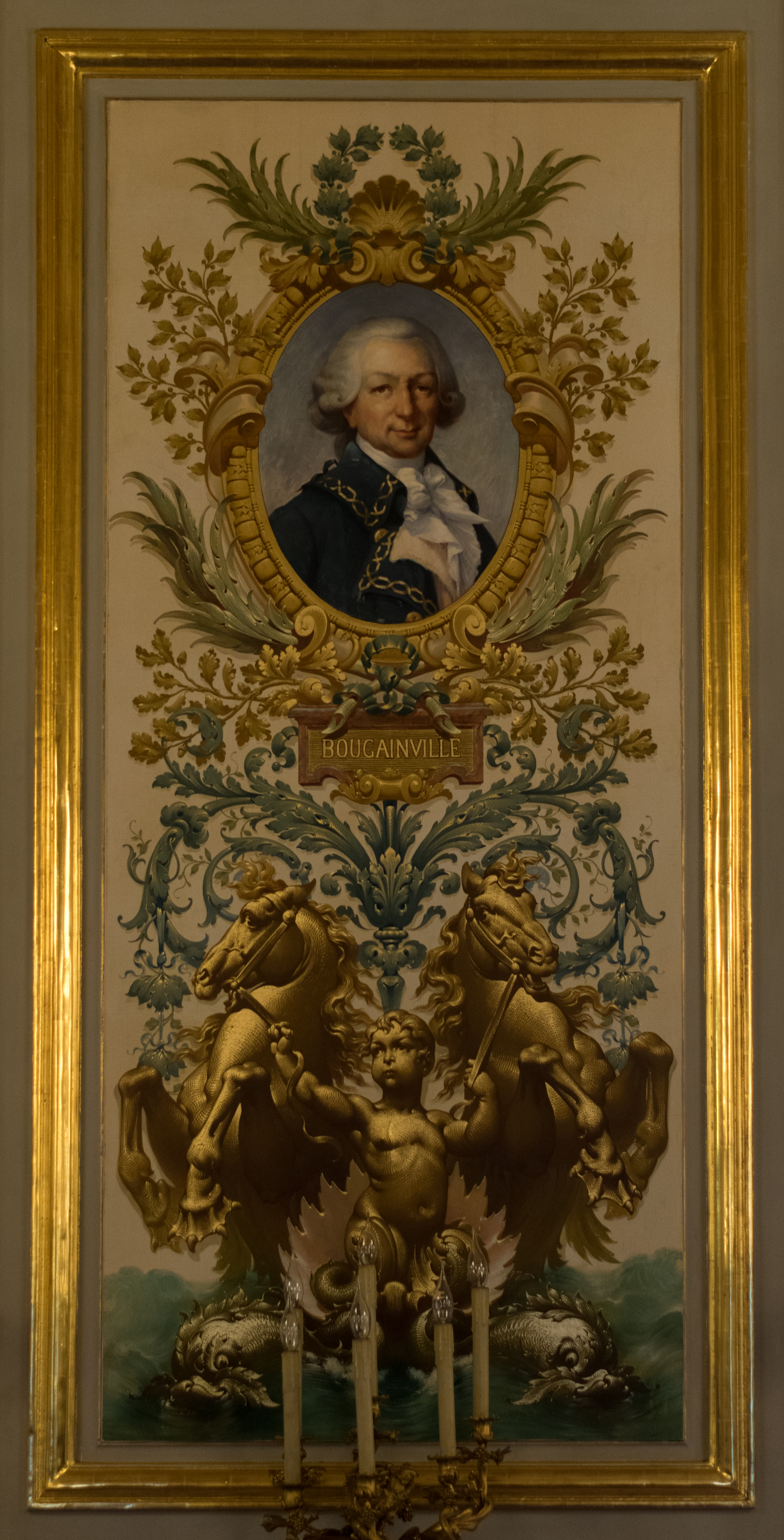
Portrait of Bougainville at Hôtel de la Marine (Paris).

Notes

Bibliography

- Roche, Jean-Michel (2005). Dictionnaire des bâtiments de la flotte de guerre française de Colbert à nos jours. Vol. 1. Group Retozel-Maury Millau. p. 74. ISBN 978-2-9525917-0-6. OCLC 165892922.
- Waggaman, Béatrice Élisabeth (1992). Le Voyage autour du monde de Bougainville: droit et imaginaire. Nancy: Presses universitaires de Nancy.
- Cave, Alfred A. (2004). The French and Indian War. New York: Greenwood Press.
- Dunmore, John (2007). Storms and Dreams: The Life of Louis de Bougainville. Fairbanks: University of Alaska Press.ISBN 9781602230019.
- Louis-Antoine de Bougainville." French and Indian War. 2003. Archived from the original on 14 November 2018 – via HighBeam Research.
