= Members of the Bougainville House of Representatives, 2020–2025 =

This is a list of members of the Bougainville House of Representatives from 2020 to 2025 as elected at the 2020 election.

Member	Constituency
Mathias Salas	North Nasioi
Justin Bordger	South Nasioi
Lawrence Sirapui	Eivo/Torau
Linus J Dakei	Former Combatant (Central)
Bernard Bobos	Peit
Earnesty Peter Teddu	Kongara
Charles Kakapetai	Teua
Polycarp Suito	Suir
Melvin Wilolopa	Lato
Junior Tumare	Makis
Jason Barananko	Rau
Charry Napto Kiso	Nissan
Yolande Geraldine Paul	Women's (Central)
Callen T Matuna	Former Combatant (Northern)
Joseph Kim Suwamaru	Kopii
Theonila Roka Matbob	Ioro
Dennis Alexman Lokonai	Bolave
Willie Masiu	Konnou
Raymond Masono	Atolls
Ezekiel Massat	Tonsu
Ishmael Toroama	President of the ABG
Joseph Mona	Lule
Patrick Nisira	Halia
Rodney Osioco	Kokoda
Dr Joe Kim Suwamaru	Ramu
Unknown	Speaker of Parliament
Therese Naru Kaetavara	Women's (South)
Zacharias Nungnung	Motuna/Huyono/Tokunutui
Robert Jamal Sawa	Hagogohe
John Bosco Ragu	Tsitalato
Amanda Masono Getsi	Women's (Northern)
Carlos Kaetavara	Baba
Fabian Saleu Epota	Torokina
John Tabinaman	Mahari
Thomas Tarii	Former Combatant (South)
Thompson Gitovea	Taonita Teop
Jacob Tooke	Baubake
Xavier Kareku	Haku
Morris Opeti	Taonita Tinputz
Paul Otto Cheung	Selau
Robin Wilson	Terra

During a by-election for an Open Seat in 2022, Carolyn Poli was also elected.
