= Members of the Bougainville House of Representatives, 2015–2020 =

This is a list of members of the Bougainville House of Representatives from 2015 to 2020 as elected at the 2015 election.

Member	Constituency
Nicholas Darku	North Nasioi
Simon Dasiona	South Nasioi
Clarence Dency	Eivo/Torau
Noah Doko	Former Combatant (Central)
Josephine Getsi	Peit
Dominic Itta	Kongara
Charles Kakapetai	Teua
Luke Karaston	Suir
Christopher Kena	Lato
John Vianney Kepas	Makis
Thomas Keriri	Rau
Charry Napto Kiso	Nissan
Marcelline Kokiai	Women's (Central)
Ben Malatan Korus	Former Combatant (Northern)
Philip Kuhena	Kopii
Michael Lapolela	Ioro
Dennis Alexman Lokonai	Bolave
Willie Masiu	Konnou
Raymond Masono	Atolls
Ezekiel Massat	Tonsu
John Momis	President of the ABG
Joseph Kangki Nabuai	Lule
Patrick Nisira	Halia
Rodney Osioco	Kokoda
Thomas Pa'ataku	Ramu
Simon Pentanu	Speaker of Parliament
Isabel Peta	Women's (South)
Albert Punghau	Motuna/Huyono/Tokunutui
Robert Hamal Sawa	Hagogohe
Fidelis Semoso	Tsitalato
Francesca Semoso	Women's (Northern)
William Silamai	Baba
Steven Suako	Torokina
John Tabinaman	Mahari
Thomas Tarii	Former Combatant (South)
Raopos Apou Tepaia	Taonita Teop
Jacob Tooke	Baubake
Robert Chika Tulsa	Haku
David Braun Vatavi	Taonita Tinputz
Joseph Watawi	Selau
Robin Wilson	Terra
