= 2015 Bougainvillean general election =

2015 Bougainvillean presidential election
- May 11–25, 2015
- Registered: 173,000
- Turnout: 106,227
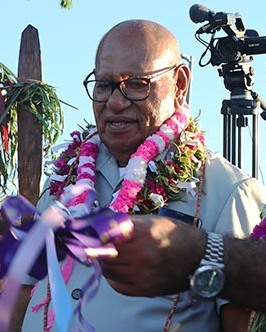

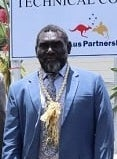
Candidate	John Momis	Ishmael Toroama
Party	NBP	Independent
Instant-runoff final vote	51,382	18,466
First-preference vote	48,826	16,077
Candidate	Sam Kauona	Sam Akoitai
Party	Independent	Bougainville Islands Unity Party
Instant-runoff final vote	14,965	11,523
First-preference vote	12,383	9,443
President before election
John Momis
NBP
Elected President
John Momis
NBP

A presidential and parliamentary election was held in the Autonomous Region of Bougainville between 11 May and 25 May 2015. Incumbent President John Momis won re-election, the first President of the Autonomous Region of Bougainville to do so.

== Campaign ==
A total of 342 candidates contested the election, involving the 33 constituency seats, three seats reserved for women and three seats reserved for former combatants in the Bougainville House of Representatives and the presidency itself. A total of 104,542 valid votes and 1,685 informal votes were cast. The common roll included approximately 173,000 registered voters.

=== Presidential candidates ===
Nine candidates contested the presidency: incumbent President John Momis (New Bougainville Party), former Speaker of the House Nick Peniai (Bougainville Labour Party), former national Minister for Bougainville Affairs Sam Akoitai (Bougainville Islands Unity Party), and independent candidates Justin Pokata Kira, Sam Kauona, Peter Nerau, Simon Dumarinu, Ishmael Toroama and Reuben Siara.

=== Independence referendum ===
As a part of the 2001 Bougainville Peace Agreement, the island was scheduled to hold a referendum on independence before 2020. The upcoming 2019 Bougainvillean independence referendum was an issue in the election, as whichever administration was elected would be in charge of managing the referendum. Analysts reported that incumbent president John Momis received support because his experience was seen as valuable for managing the referendum.

== Results ==
=== Presidential election ===
The presidential election was held under the instant-runoff voting system, with voters classifying up to three candidates. John Momis received a clear plurality of first-preference votes with 48,826. Momis was easily re-elected, achieving an absolute majority on the fourth elimination with a total of 51,382 votes. His nearest competitor, former rebel commander Ishmael Toroama, finished with 18,466 votes. Sam Kauona and Sam Akoitai settled for third and fourth placings with 14,965 and 11,523 votes respectively.

=== Parliamentary election ===
The election marked the victory of Josephine Getsi, the first woman to win an open seat in the Bougainville House of Representatives. Of the 39 constituencies in the Bougainville House of Representatives, only 14 incumbent members were re-elected. All women's and former combatants' seats saw new members elected.

2015 Bougainvillean Parliamentary Election

North Bougainville District
Constituency	Candidates	Elected^{[A]}
Women	10	Francesca Semoso
Former Combatant	14	Ben Malatan Korus
Atolls	8	Raymond Masono
Hagogohe	5	Robert Hamal Sawa
Haku	24	Robert Chika Tulsa
Halia	5	Patrick Nisira
Mahari	8	John Tabinaman
Nissan	6	Charry Napto Kiso
Peit	12	Josephine Getsi
Selau	14	Joseph Watawi
Suir	9	Luke Karaston
Taonita Teop	11	Raopos Apou Tepaia
Taonita Tinputz	6	David Braun Vatavi
Teua	6	Charles Kakapetai
Tonsu	13	Ezekiel Massat
Tsitalato	7	Fidelis Semoso

Central Bougainville District
Constituency	Candidates	Elected^{[A]}
Women	6	Marcelline Kokiai
Former Combatant	7	Noah Doko
Eivo/Torau	11	Clarence Dency
Ioro	6	Michael Lapelela
Kokoda	6	Rodney Osioco
Kongara	2	Dominic Itta
North Nasioi	10	Nicholas Darku
Rau	9	Thomas Keriri
South Nasioi	9	Simon Dasiona
Terra	6	Robin Wilson

South Bougainville District
Constituency	Candidates	Elected^{[A]}
Women	7	Isabel Peta
Former combatant	5	Thomas Tarii
Baba	11	William Silamai
Baubake	8	Jacob Tooke
Bolave	8	Dennis Alexman Lokonai
Konnou	8	Louis Miriki Masiu
Kopii	10	Philip Kuhena
Lato	7	Christopher Kena
Lule	8	Joseph Kangki Nabuai
Makis	7	John Vianney Kepas
Motuna/Huyono	8	Albert Punghau
Ramu	6	Thomas Pa'ataku
Torokina	10	Steven Suako

^{A} incumbent candidates who were re-elected are in italics.
