= Simon Dumarinu =

Member of the National Parliament for Central Bougainville
- In office 2022–2024
- Prime Minister: James Marape
- Preceded by: Sam Akoitai
- Succeeded by: Jimmy Miringtoro
- In office 2017–2018
- Prime Minister: Peter O'Neill
- Preceded by: Jimmy Miringtoro
- Succeeded by: Sam Akoitai

Personal details
- Born: 1956 (Note: Some sources state that Dumarinu was born on 4 June, while others state he was born on 4 April.)
- Died: 9 August 2024 (aged 68)
- Party: Social Democratic Party
- Occupation: Politician, priest

Simon Dumarinu (1956 – 9 August 2024) was a Papua New Guinean politician and Marist Catholic priest from the Autonomous Region of Bougainville. A member of the Social Democratic Party, he served as Member of Parliament for Central Bougainville from 2017 to 2018 and from 2022 until his death in 2024.

During his first term in the National Parliament, Dumarinu served as Minister for Bougainville Affairs and was involved in preparations for the 2019 Bougainvillean independence referendum. In April 2018, a recount determined that Sam Akoitai had received four more votes than Dumarinu in the 2017 election. Akoitai replaced Dumarinu, but he died in office in 2021; Dumarinu regained his seat in the subsequent by-election. In June 2024, Dumarinu launched the Central Bougainville Five-Year Development Plan. He died in office the month after.

== Early life and priesthood ==
Born in 1956, Simon Dumarinu was from the village of Orami in Ioro, Panguna, Central Bougainville. He was a member of Barapang, one of the five main clans in Panguna. After attending primary school in Deomori and St. Joseph's High School in Rigu, Dumarinu was admitted to Passam National High School on the mainland.

In 1981, Dumarinu travelled to Fiji to begin training as a Catholic priest. He returned to Papua New Guinea in 1983 to begin his studies at the Holy Spirit College in Bomana. In 1990, Dumarinu returned to Bougainville, where a secessionist conflict had broken out, and was ordained as a priest at Tunuru Parish in Kieta. He was a member of the Catholic Society of Mary. During the conflict, Dumarinu provided spiritual support for people who were suffering. He supported Bougainvillean independence while advocating for peace between Bougainville and Papua New Guinea. He also ministered to both sides of the conflict and facilitated dialogue between warring factions. When a Papua New Guinea Defence Force soldier was going to be executed in Arawa, he convinced the Bougainville Revolutionary Army to turn the soldier over to his parish, saving his life.

From 1999 to 2006, Dumarinu was a missionary in the Solomon Islands. After returning to Bougainville in 2007, he served as the Marist regional superior until 2014.

== Political career ==
In 2015, Dumarinu ran for President of the Autonomous Region of Bougainville. John Momis, a former Marist priest, won the election. In the 2017 Papua New Guinean general election, Dumarinu stood for the seat of Central Bougainville in the National Parliament as a member of the Social Democratic Party. On 22 July, he was declared the winner, having secured 13 more votes than Sam Akoitai. (Note: Dumarinu received 7,285 votes, while Akoitai received 7,277.) Prime Minister Peter O'Neill appointed him Minister for Bougainville Affairs.

Unsatisfied with the counting process, Sam Akoitai filed an election petition. In April 2018, a recount determined that Akoitai had received four more votes that Dumarinu, ousting Dumarinu from parliament. (Note: The recount found that Akoitai had received 7,257 votes, while Dumarinu had received 7,253.) Dumarinu requested another recount, alleging that the returning officer had made errors and failed to account for the difference in total votes between 2017 and 2018. Justice Lawrence Kangwia refused, stating that organic law did not allow a recount of another recount. In addition, he deemed Dumarinu's complaint that Akoitai's ex-wife had assisted in the recount irrelevant, as the two had been divorced for 35 years.

After the death of Sam Akoitai, the seat was left vacant until Dumarinu regained it in the 2022 election. In 2024, he launched the Central Bougainville Five-Year Development Plan with Marape and the Bougainvillean president, Ishmael Toroama.

While attending to customary obligations in Orami, Dumarinu fell ill and was rushed to Buka General Hospital, where he died on 9 August 2024. On 3 September, a state funeral for Dumarinu was held at St. Joseph's Catholic Cathedral. Later in the day, he was taken to the Parliament Chamber to lie in state. Prime Minister Marape and Opposition Leader Douglas Tomuriesa led in giving their condolences.
