= COVID-19 pandemic in Oceania =

- Map of the COVID-19 pandemic in Oceania (as of 24 December 2022) 1,000,000+ Confirmed cases 100,000–999,999 Confirmed cases 10,000-99,999 Confirmed cases 1,000–9,999 Confirmed cases 100–999 Confirmed cases 10–99 Confirmed cases 1–9 Confirmed cases
- Disease: COVID-19
- Pathogen: SARS-CoV-2
- Location: Oceania
- First outbreak: Wuhan, Hubei, China
- Index case: Melbourne, Australia
- Arrival date: 25 January 2020 (6 years, 9 months, 3 weeks and 3 days ago)
- Confirmed cases: ≈ 11,313,230 (as of 24 July 2022)
- Recovered: 10,417,291 (as of 24 July 2022) (partially reported)
- Deaths: ≈ 17,740 (as of 24 July 2022)
- Territories: 28

The COVID-19 pandemic was confirmed to have reached Oceania on 25 January 2020 with the first confirmed case reported in Melbourne, Australia. The virus has spread to all sovereign states and territories in the region. Australia and New Zealand were praised for their handling of the pandemic in comparison to other Western nations, with New Zealand and each state in Australia wiping out all community transmission of the virus several times even after re-introduction in the community.

As a result of the high transmissibility of the Delta variant however, by August 2021, the Australian states of New South Wales and Victoria had conceded defeat in their eradication efforts. In early October 2021, New Zealand also abandoned its elimination strategy.

== Statistics by country and territory ==
Summary table of confirmed cases in Oceania
Country/Territory	Total cases	Deaths	Recoveries	Ref
Australia	11,861,161	25,795	no data	
New Zealand	2,676,526	3,926	2,669,261	
Hawaii	427,093	2,192	no data	
New Caledonia	80,064	314	no data	
French Polynesia	78,700	649	no data	
Fiji	69,047	885	66,307	
Guam	52,187	417	no data	
Papua New Guinea	46,864	670	46,168	
Micronesia	31,765 (Note: one suspected case was deemed to be a non-infectious historical case and tested negative after subsequent antibody and antigen tests)	65	no data	
Solomon Islands	24,954	199	no data	
Tonga	16,992	13	no data	
Samoa	17,057	31	no data	
Marshall Islands	16,297	17	no data	
Northern Mariana Islands	14,334	41	no data	
Vanuatu	12,019	14	no data	
American Samoa	8,359	34	no data	
Cook Islands	7,152 (Note: A non-infectious historic case has a positive PCR Test in June 2021 after returning to the Cook Islands following release from managed quarantine in New Zealand. A second historic non-infectious case was detected in December 2021. The Cook Islands official reported cases to the WHO is one.)	2	7,150	
Palau	6,372 (Note: two non-infectious historical cases detected in May-June 2021, both cases were officially reported to the WHO)	10	6,268	
Nauru	5,393	1	no data	
Kiribati	5,085 (Note: two seafarers returning from Papua New Guinea returned a positive PCR test result in May 2021, both individuals were quarantined on the vessel without entering Kiribati. It is unclear if these were active or historical cases, however neither case has been reported to the WHO, and officially Kiribati declares itself 'COVID-free')	24	no data	
Wallis and Futuna	3,550	8	no data	
Tuvalu	2,943	1	466	
Easter Island	1,751	0	1,745	
Bougainville	1,202	19	no data	
Niue	1,092	0	1,092	
Norfolk Island	1,051	0	1,039	
Tokelau	80	0	0	
Pitcairn Islands	4	0	0	
Total	13,438,836	22,477	12,236,503	

Note: The statistical information in this table may vary from official reports and WHO data, and is known to inconsistently include historical and suspected cases which may have returned a positive diagnostic test result. In some cases, these positive test results were reported by the media and/or by the relevant health authorities as confirmed cases, but this is not necessarily indicative of active SARS-CoV-2 infection due to most COVID-19 tests analysing past presence of the virus through the detection of relevant antibodies or through the detection of one or more viral fragments which are slowly shed during or after a person's recovery. These viral fragments are not indicative of whether that person has a current presence of the virus and are not indicative of infectivity.

== Timeline by country and territory ==
=== Australia ===
On 19 January 2020, Australia's Chief Health Officer, Brendan Murphy said that while the spike in numbers needed to be cautiously observed, there was "no cause for alarm in Australia" at the moment

Map of the outbreak in Australia 1,000,000+ confirmed cases 100,000–999,999 confirmed cases 10,000–99,999 confirmed cases 100–9,999 confirmed cases

On 25 January 2020, the first case of a SARS-CoV-2 infection was reported, that of a Chinese citizen who arrived from Guangzhou on 19 January. The patient received treatment in Melbourne. On the same day, three other patients tested positive in Sydney after returning from Wuhan.

On 1 March 2020, a 78-year-old man from Western Australia, who had been a passenger on the cruise ship Diamond Princess, became the first person to die from coronavirus in Australia. He died in a hospital in Perth.

Australian borders were closed to all non-residents from 20 March 2020; all returning travellers are required to undergo two weeks' quarantine in hotels. From March onwards, many states and territories also closed their internal borders, with similar quarantine requirements for exempt travellers. A breach of quarantine in hotels across Victoria led to the state experiencing a second wave and returning to strict lockdown measures from July through to October 2020, successfully waning the spread of the virus.

No deaths from COVID-19 were recorded in Australia from 28 December 2020 until 13 April 2021, when an overseas returned traveller died at The Prince Charles Hospital, Brisbane. There were then none until 11 July, when NSW Health reported a COVID-19 death from the NSW Delta outbreak. In late August 2021, Victoria also reported its first deaths since the end of the outbreak in June 2020 that saw the longest lockdown period in Australia at the time. In response to rising cases, both New South Wales and Victoria underwent extended lockdowns, taking 107 and 77 days respectively, with both states opening up in October 2021. During this time, other Australian states closed their borders to these two states.

Beginning in December 2021, Australia has experienced a major outbreak of the Omicron variant, with significantly higher case numbers than at any other time of the pandemic. As of 22 April 2022, Australia has reported 5,374,402 cases and 6,893 deaths. At the time of writing, there are an estimated 370,228 active cases in Australia.

==== Norfolk Island ====
In March 2020, as a precautionary measure, the Norfolk Island Regional Council imposed a 32-day travel ban and declared a state of emergency. Administrator Eric Hutchinson stated that the measures were necessary due to the remote island's extremely limited health capacity. Lockdown measures began to be lifted from 6 May 2020.

Following outbreaks in the Australian Eastern States and Territories in mid-2021, Norfolk islands implemented further restrictions. Covid support packages are available for Norfolk Island businesses and residents.

Norfolk Island has begun administering COVID-19 vaccinations and is expected to complete its initial vaccination rollout by October 2021. As of 2 August, over 60% of residents have received their first jab. Due to the accelerated rollout of the Comirnaty (Pfizer) COVID-19 vaccine and low levels of vaccine hesitancy in Norfolk Island, the region's COVID-19 vaccination clinic is currently slated to be closed on 31 September.

On 30 December 2021, two positive cases were reported. Four other cases were identified on 1 January 2022.

=== Chile ===
==== Easter Island ====
On 19 March 2020, the local government of Easter Island ordered a lockdown of the island and requested LATAM Airlines to evacuate all tourists on the island. However, on 24 March, the first case of coronavirus was reported on the island. By the start of April, 5 confirmed cases had been reported. All cases have recovered after some weeks and no new cases have been reported since.

=== Fiji ===
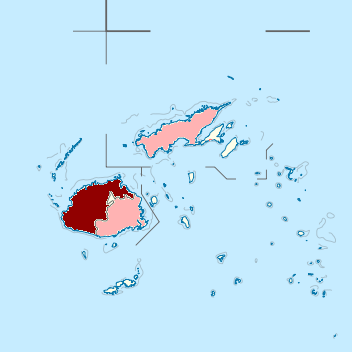
Map of the outbreak in Fiji by region 150+ confirmed cases 101-150 confirmed cases 51-100 confirmed cases 11-50 confirmed cases 1-10 confirmed cases

The first case of the disease in Fiji was reported on 19 March 2020, leading to the lockdowns of Fiji's two largest cities, Lautoka and Suva for over twenty days.

On 31 July 2020, Fiji recorded its first death from COVID-19, a 66-year-old man who was repatriated from India.

After over 365 days of no new cases in the community, Fiji recorded a new community case on 19 April 2021 leading to the immediate lockdown of Nadi and a second lockdown for Lautoka. This lockdown lasted almost fifty days and ended on 5 June 2021 despite COVID-19 cases still growing in the community. A similar lockdown was also introduced in the Central Division which contained Suva, Lami and Nausori in a single large containment area. The lockdown for the Lami-Nausori containment remains in place as of date.

By 20 August 2021, Fiji had confirmed 43,096 cases of COVID-19 with 21,825 recoveries and 432 deaths (plus 247 other unrelated COVID-19 positive patients deaths).

As of 24 August 2021, Fiji had reported 44,188 confirmed cases of COVID-19 with 444 deaths to WHO; and as of 13 August 2021, a total of 690,888 vaccine doses having been administered.

=== France ===
==== French Polynesia ====
On 11 March 2020, the first case in French Polynesia was confirmed. The first patient was Maina Sage, a member of the French National Assembly. There were 39 confirmed cases on 4 April. A ban on sales of alcohol was extended until the crisis is over.

By 11 November 2020, 11,316 cases and more than 4,842 recoveries had been reported in French Polynesia.

As of 12 August 2021, a total of 137,967 vaccine doses have been administered.

As of 24 August 2021, there have been 40,178 confirmed cases and 328 deaths.

==== New Caledonia ====
As of 18 July 2020, there were 22 cases in New Caledonia. President Thierry Santa went into self-isolation on 4 April after a member of his staff tested positive. On 7 March 2021, the first nine locally transmitted cases were reported.

==== Wallis and Futuna ====
Map of the outbreak in Wallis and Futuna by islands 150+ confirmed cases 100–150 confirmed cases 50–100 confirmed cases 1–50 confirmed cases

On 16 October 2020, the collectivity reported its first case. On 23 October, a second test on the first case returned a negative result, making the collectivity again COVID-free.

A local community outbreak began on 6 March 2021, and the number of cases has since risen to 302 by 20 March. The first death was reported on 22 March.

=== Kiribati ===
On 1 February 2020, the government of Kiribati put all visas from China on hold and required new arrivals to fill in a health form and travellers from countries with the coronavirus to go through a self-quarantine period. Despite not having any cases, on 28 March President Taneti Maamau declared a state of emergency.

On 10 September 2020, the government announced it will keep the borders closed until the end of the year to keep the country free of the virus.

In the month of May 2021, the first two cases of COVID-19 in Kiribati were confirmed, both cases coming from two people on a fishing trip, who were quickly isolated and contained.

As of 14 December 2021, there have been 0 confirmed cases of COVID-19 with 0 deaths, reported to WHO. As of 18 November 2021, a total of 82,167 vaccine doses had been administered, representing ≈ 19% fully-vaccinated and ≈49% with at least one-dose.

=== Marshall Islands ===
On 24 January 2020, the Marshall Islands issued a travel advisory that requires any visitors to the country to have spent at least 14 days in a country free of the virus. On 1 March, the ban was extended to China, Macau, Hong Kong, Japan, South Korea, Italy, and Iran.

As of 18 March, all incoming international travel had been temporarily suspended, as well as some intra-island flight services.

The first two positive cases of COVID-19 were confirmed at the US Army Garrison on Kwajalein Atoll (USAG-KA) on 29 October. They were both placed in managed quarantine.

On 29 December, the Marshall Islands became the first independent nation in the Pacific to begin its COVID-19 vaccinations.

=== Micronesia ===
The Federated States of Micronesia reported its first suspected case in managed isolation on 8 January 2021. The suspected case was later deemed to be non-infectious and a detection of historical viral fragments after the individual returned negative antibody and antigen tests later in the month.

As of 25 April 2022, the Federated States of Micronesia official COVID-19 case count reported to the WHO is five; and as of 6 April 2022, a total of 117,839 vaccine doses have been administered.

=== Nauru ===
The government declared a national emergency as a preventive measure, suspending all but one weekly flight to the country and instituting a 14-day quarantine for all arrivals.

On 14 December, an historical case was identified on a shipping vessel. Since the case remained on board, it is not considered to have entered Nauru.

As of 30 March 2022, 22,976 vaccines doses have been administered.

On 2 April 2022, Nauru recorded its first two cases of COVID-19.

=== New Zealand ===
Map of COVID-19 case totals in New Zealand by District health board (DHB)

New Zealand reported its first case on 28 February 2020 from a citizen who had arrived from Iran on 26 February. The second case was a citizen who had recently traveled to northern Italy. The first local transmission of the virus happened on 4 March in Auckland. On 29 March, New Zealand reported its first fatality, a woman in her 70s from the West Coast region.

The New Zealand Government introduced a four-level alert system on 21 March to manage the COVID-19 pandemic in New Zealand. On 25 March, the country moved into Alert Level 4, placing the country in a nationwide lockdown and closing its borders. While mass gatherings were banned and schools and most businesses were closed, essential services such as supermarkets, petrol stations, and health services remained open. Due to successful efforts to eliminate the pandemic within New Zealand's borders, the alert level system was progressively lowered to Level 3 on 27 April and Level 2 on 13 May, with lockdown restrictions and social distancing measures being eased at each stage. On 9 June, New Zealand entered into Alert level 1, where remaining restrictions on economic activities and daily life were eliminated but the country's borders remained closed to most international travellers.

On 4 May, the country marked the first day without the reports of any new case of COVID-19, a month after the country announced lockdown. By 31 May, there was only one active case with a total of 1,504 (1,154 confirmed and 350 probable) cases, 1,481 recoveries, and 22 deaths. By 8 June, that last active case had recovered. Following 24 consecutive days of no new cases, two new cases resulting from overseas travel were reported on 16 June.

On 11 August 2020, four cases were reported in Auckland, making the first reported community transmissions after 102 days. In response to the Auckland August 2020 community outbreak, lockdown restrictions were reinstated nationwide. Due to the reduction in community transmissions, lockdown restrictions in Auckland and the rest of New Zealand were progressively eliminated on 30 August, 23 September, and 7 October 2020.

While most cases in New Zealand throughout 2021 have occurred at the border, community outbreaks have occurred periodically predominantly in the Auckland Region in February and August 2021, leading to the reinstatement of national lockdown restrictions on both occasions.

New Zealand's national vaccination programme began on 20 February 2021. As of August 2021, 3.33 million vaccinations have been administered; with 2.17 million receiving their first dose and 1.16 million additionally receiving their second dose.

In early October 2021, Prime Minister Jacinda Ardern confirmed that New Zealand's elimination strategy would be phased out in favour of a new model that takes into account the country's vaccination rates.

In November 2021, a Māori tribe asked anti-vaxxers to stop using the Ka Mate haka to promote their protests.

==== Cook Islands ====
On 5 June 2021, the first positive PCR test result in the Cook Islands was obtained which was reported in the media. However, it was determined to be a non-infectious historical known case of a person who had earlier completed quarantine in New Zealand and therefore not counted as an active confirmed case, however already been counted in New Zealand and recovered.

By 2 August 2021, the Cook Islands reported to the WHO a total of 21,761 vaccine doses have been administered. On 24 August 2021, the Te Marae Ora Ministry of Health reported it had completed its COVID-19 national vaccination programme, with 96.7 per cent of the eligible population, people aged 16-years or older, fully vaccinated. All doses were the Pfizer–BioNTech COVID-19 vaccine, Comirnaty. The Government is planning a further operation to vaccinate 12-15 year olds.

On 3 December 2021, the Cook Islands reported one suspected case of COVID-19, it was later determined to be a non-infectious historic case.

On 15 February 2022, one case was reported in an individual in Rarotonga, who had recently returned from Auckland. The case was of the Omicron variant.

==== Niue ====
On 9 March 2022, Niue reported its first case of COVID-19 as the result of travel from New Zealand.

==== Tokelau ====
On 21 December 2022, Tokelau reported its first cases of COVID-19.

=== Palau ===
Palau began implementing border controls early on. The President of Palau Thomas Remengesau Jr. issued an executive order suspending all charter flights from China, Macau, and Hong Kong from 1–29 February 2020. By March, the country's borders were closed.

The order also quarantined all non-citizens who recently entered the country for fourteen days.

Palauans began receiving COVID-19 vaccines in 2021. As a signatory of the Compact of Free Association with the United States, Palau has received vaccines from Operation Warp Speed.

On 31 May 2021, the first case was confirmed.

As of 24 August 2021, there have been 2 confirmed cases of COVID-19 with 0 deaths, reported to WHO. As of 8 August 2021, a total of 26,796 vaccine doses have been administered.

=== Papua New Guinea ===
On 20 March 2020, the first case in Papua New Guinea was confirmed.

Swabs were taken and sent to the Medical Research Institute in Goroka for testing. Three announcements followed. First the Health Minister Jelta Wong declared a probable case, and Prime Minister James Marape followed up by declaring the result as negative. Further tests were conducted and the prime minister confirmed the positive result for COVID-19. Police Minister Bryan Kramer then stated on Facebook that the inconsistent results were due to faulty test equipment, and that requests had been made for further testing to be conducted in Melbourne. As of 19 November 2020, Papua New Guinea had 602 cases, 585 recoveries and 7 deaths.

As of 24 August 2021, there have been 17,947 confirmed cases of COVID-19 in Papua New Guinea with 192 deaths, reported to WHO. As of 12 August 2021, a total of 102,074 vaccine doses have been administered.

==== Bougainville ====
The Autonomous Region of Bougainville's confirmed its first case of the COVID-19 pandemic on Friday, 7 August 2020, in Arawa, Bougainville.

=== Samoa ===
There were two potential COVID-19 cases in Samoa that after returning a positive PCR test result in November 2020. However it is likely both cases were simply detection of viral fragments from non-contagious historical cases as neither case had symptoms and their close contacts tested negative. A third positive PCR test was returned on 12 February 2021. Of the three positive test results, Samoa has only official declared one confirmed case of COVID-19 to the WHO.

=== Solomon Islands ===
The first case of COVID-19 in the Solomon Islands was confirmed on 3 October 2020 as a student who had been repatriated from the Philippines on the 28 September 2020.

As of 24 August 2021, there have been 20 confirmed cases of COVID-19 with 0 deaths, reported to WHO. The last confirmed case was reported on 5 April 2021 and all cases have recovered. As of 6 August 2021, a total of 56,621 vaccine doses have been administered.

=== Tonga ===
On 29 October, Tonga reported its first case; a seasonal worker returning from Christchurch in New Zealand.

=== Tuvalu ===
On 20 May 2022, Tuvalu reported its first three cases in quarantine.

=== United Kingdom ===
==== Pitcairn Islands ====
The Pitcairn Islands reported its first case on 16 July 2022.

=== United States ===
While the epicenter of COVID-19 in the USA lies in the contiguous 48 states, cases and outbreaks have been reported in the country's Oceanic jurisdictions. The state of Hawaii has by far the most coronavirus cases in the region, followed up by the territories of Guam and the Northern Mariana Islands.

==== American Samoa ====
On 9 November 2020, American Samoa reported its first three positive test results. As all three suspected cases were aboard a container ship, did not enter the country and were not confirmed to be active cases, they were not reported to the WHO.

As of 24 August 2021 in reporting to the WHO, there have been no confirmed COVID-19 cases and no deaths; and as of 8 August, 52,769 vaccine doses have been administered.

==== Guam ====
By 28 August 2020, the US territory of Guam has had 1,287 confirmed cases of the virus, 488 recoveries, and ten deaths.

As of 24 August 2021, there have been 9,138 confirmed cases of COVID-19 in Guam with 145 deaths, reported to WHO. As of 8 August 2021, a total of 202,807 vaccine doses have been administered.

==== Hawaii ====
Map of the outbreak in Hawaii by confirmed total infections per 100,000 people (last updated March 2021) 10,000+ 3,000–10,000 1,000–3,000 300–1,000 100–300 30–100 0–30 No confirmed infected or no data

The first case was reported on 6 March 2020, and the first death was on 30 March.

In response to the initial spike in coronavirus cases, Governor David Ige issued a state-wide lockdown, which lasted from 24 March to 30 April. After another spike occurred a few months later, a second lockdown was issued from 27 August to 9 September. It was then extended until 24 September.

The center of the outbreak is on the island of Oahu, where most Hawaii residents live. Cases have also been reported on Hawaii Island, Maui, Molokai, Lanai and Kauai. No cases have been reported on Niʻihau, Kahoʻolawe and the Northwestern Hawaiian Islands.

As of 24 August 2021, Hawaii had the lowest case rate of all 50 states at 4,042 per 100,000 people and the lowest death rate at 39.9 per 100,000 people.

As of 24 August 2021, the US state of Hawaii had a cumulative total of 54,366 confirmed cases, 2,869 probable cases, 565 deaths and 3,220 hospitalizations.

==== Northern Mariana Islands ====
As of 2 November 2020, the islands confirmed 96 coronavirus cases and two deaths.

As of 24 August 2021 in reporting to the WHO, there have been 224 confirmed COVID-19 cases and 2 deaths; and as of 5 August, 63,302 vaccines doses have been administered.

=== Vanuatu ===
On 11 November 2020, Vanuatu recorded its first COVID case by a man who tested positive after returning from the United States via Auckland and Sydney.

As of 24 August 2021 in reporting to the WHO, there have been 3 confirmed COVID-19 cases and zero deaths; and as of 15 August, 27,716 vaccines doses have been administered.

== International aid ==
In late July 2021, UNICEF and the government of Japan announced US$20.8 million partnership to support Pacific Island governments regarding their battle against COVID-19. Prime Minister of Japan Yoshihide Suga had previously announced financial aid to boost health sectors in Pacific island nations during the 9th Pacific Islands Leaders Meeting (PALM9).

== Statistics ==
=== Total confirmed cases ===
View source data.

=== Total confirmed (and probable) cases by country ===
Daily cases for the most infected Oceania countries:

View source data.

== See also ==
- 2019–2020 dengue fever epidemic
- 2019 Samoa measles outbreak
- 2020 in Oceania
