= COVID-19 pandemic in the Autonomous Region of Bougainville =

Ongoing COVID-19 viral pandemic in the Autonomous Region of Bougainville

- Location of the Autonomous Region of Bougainville within Papua New Guinea
- Disease: COVID-19
- Pathogen: SARS-CoV-2
- Location: Autonomous Region of Bougainville
- Arrival date: August 7, 2020 (5 years, 9 months, 1 week and 4 days)
- Confirmed cases: 1,202
- Recovered: 1,186
- Deaths: 19

Government website
- Autonomous Region of Bougainville State of Emergency (SOE) COVID-19

The COVID-19 pandemic in the Autonomous Region of Bougainville is part of the ongoing worldwide pandemic of coronavirus disease 2019 (COVID-19) caused by severe acute respiratory syndrome coronavirus 2 (SARS-CoV-2). The Autonomous Region of Bougainville's confirmed its first case of the COVID-19 pandemic on Friday, August 7, 2020, in Arawa, Bougainville. The first documented arrival of COVID-19 in Bougainville occurred just before the start of the Bougainvillean general and presidential elections, which took place over the course of three weeks beginning on August 12, 2020, and ending on September 1, 2020.

== Background ==
On January 12, 2020, the World Health Organization (WHO) confirmed that a novel coronavirus was the cause of a respiratory illness in a cluster of people in Wuhan, Hubei province, China, which was reported to the WHO on December 31, 2019.

== Timeline in Bougainville ==
=== August 2020 ===
On August 1, 2020, the Autonomous Bougainville Government (ABG) began restricting flights from the rest of Papua New Guinea after a new surge of coronavirus cases COVID-19 pandemic in Papua New Guinea. While a COVID-19 state of emergency was already in place, passengers had been able to fly into Buka Airport and Aropa Airport from Papua New Guinea since early June 2020. Beginning August 1, 2020, flights into Bougainville could only be MEDEVAC or an approved charter flight. The government also then needed to grant permission to anyone seeking to fly out of Bougainville. Just one freight flight was allowed to land in Bougainville each week.

The Autonomous Bougainville Government confirmed its first positive case of COVID-19 on Friday, August 7, 2020. The first patient was identified as a 22-year college student. The student returned to Buka, Bougainville, passing through Buka Airport, from Port Moresby, the capital of Papua New Guinea. He then traveled to Central Bougainville District before testing positive for COVID-19. Once identified, the patient was quarantined in the town of Arawa. Contact tracing was set up to find individuals that the man may have come in contact with.

In August 2020, the government began requiring the operators and drivers of public motor vehicles (PMVs) to keep daily recorded logs of all passengers in an effort to aid contact tracing. Public motor vehicles are the main form of public transportation in Bougainville. The Autonomous Bougainville Government also banned travel between different localities and constituencies for four days, beginning on August 12, 2020, in an effort to stop any potential spread of COVID-19.

The confirmed arrival of COVID-19 in Autonomous Region of Bougainville occurred just before the beginning of the 2020 Bougainvillean general and presidential elections, which began on August 12, 2020. Commissioner Ignatius Nauru of the Office of the Bougainville Electoral Commissioner said efforts were in place to educate voters about COVID-19 during the three week election. Personal protective equipment (PPE), such as masks and gloves, were mandatory for all poll workers, while voters were required to sanitize their hands at the polling station. Voters were also asked to bring their own pens to fill out their ballots.

=== March 2021 ===
In March 2021, Speaker of the Bougainville House of Representatives Simon Pentanu confirmed he had been diagnosed with COVID-19 and had begun 14 days of self-quarantine.

=== April 2021 ===
On April 20, 2021, Bougainville confirmed its first death from COVID-19. In addition, health authorities confirmed that there had been a total of 284 cases in the autonomous region with 254 cases having since recovered.

== See also ==
- COVID-19 pandemic in Papua New Guinea
