= List of political parties in Bougainville =

Political parties in Bougainville lists political parties in the Autonomous Region of Bougainville, an autonomous region within Papua New Guinea. The following political parties operate only within Bougainville.

== Parties active only in Bougainville ==
- Bougainville Independence Movement
- Bougainville Labour Party
- Bougainville People's Alliance Party
- Bougainville People's Congress
- New Bougainville Party
- Bougainville Islands Unity Party

== See also ==
- List of political parties in Papua New Guinea
- Lists of political parties
