= Members of the Bougainville House of Representatives, 2005–2010 =

This is a list of members of the Bougainville House of Representatives from 2005 to 2010 as elected at the 2005 election.

Member	Constituency
Laura Ampa	Women's (South)
Alfred Bakate	South Nasioi
Lawrence Belleh	Peit
Allos Devui	Taonita Tinputz
William Epota	Torokina
Marceline Getsi	Former Combatant (Northern)
Joseph Gitovea	Taonita Teop
Dominic Itta	Kongara
Rodney Osioco Job	Kokoda
Joseph Kabui	President of the ABG
Thomas Keriri	Rau
Joseph Kinani	Lule
Moses Koiri	Ramu
Wilfred Komba	Konnou
Michael Komoiki	Kopii
Hilary Laris	Tsitalato
Thomas Lugabai	Baubake
Ezekiel Massat	Tonsu
Jeffery Nabuai	Makis
Jonathan Ngati	Motuna/Huyono/Tokunutui
Patrick Nisira	Halia
Joseph Nopei	Teua
Michael Otoroa	Lato
Thomas Pabakumi	Baba
Taehu Pais	Atolls
Alphonse Pemuko	Eivo/Torau
Nick Peniai	Speaker of Parliament
Dr Benedict Pisi	Ioro
Leo Reivasi	Terra
Mathias Salas	North Nasioi
Robert Sawa	Hagogohe
Francesca Semoso	Women's (Northern)
Gerard Sinato	Suir
Tony Siona	Bolave
John Tabinaman	Mahari
Benedict Takusi	Former Combatant (South)
Januarius Tenevi	Haku
Andrew Topensi	Nissan
Magdalene Toroansi	Women's (Central)
Glynn Tovirika	Former Combatant (Central)
Joseph Watawi	Selau
