= Members of the Bougainville House of Representatives, 2010–2015 =

This is a list of members of the Bougainville House of Representatives from 2010 to 2015, as elected at the 2010 election.

| Member | Constituency | Party |
|---|---|---|
| Joseph Bausina | Kokoda | New Bougainville Party |
| James Beani | Haku | Independent |
| Joseph Buia | Paubake | Independent |
| Elizabeth Burain | Women's (North) | Independent |
| Nicholas Daku | North Nasioi | Independent |
| Melchior Dare | Eivo/Torau | Bougainville Labour Party |
| Joseph Egilio | Rau | New Bougainville Party |
| Leo Hannett | Nissan | New Bougainville Party |
| Franco Hopping | Former Combatant (North) | Independent |
| Dominic Itta | Kongara | Bougainville People's Congress |
| Joan Jerome | Women's (Central) | New Bougainville Party |
| Wilfred Komba | Konnou | New Bougainville Party |
| Luke Karaston | Suir | Independent |
| Newton Kauva | Makis | Independent |
| John Ken | South Nasioi | New Bougainville Party |
| Carolus Ketsimur | Taonita/Tinputz | New Bougainville Party |
| Philip Kuhena | Kopii | Independent |
| Michael Laita | Former Combatant (South) | Independent |
| William Lavabua | Lato | Independent |
| Frank Pasini Marena | Atolls | New Bougainville Party |
| Ezekiel Massat | Peit | Bougainville People's Congress |
| Andrew Miriki | Speaker of Parliament | Independent |
| Paul Mitu | Lule | Independent |
| John Momis | President of the ABG | New Bougainville Party |
| Micah Mose | Taonita/Teop | Independent |
| Terry Mose | Selau | Independent |
| Patrick Nisira | Halia | Independent |
| Rev Joseph Nopei | Teua | New Bougainville Party |
| Michael Oni | Toro | Independent |
| Thomas Pa'ataku | Ramu | Independent |
| Rose Pihei | Women's (South) | Independent |
| Albert Punghau | Motuno/Huyono | Independent |
| Alexis Sarei | Peit | Independent |
| Robert Hamal Sawa | Hagogohe | Independent |
| William Siramai | Baba | Independent |
| David Sisito | Former Combatant (South) | Independent |
| Cosmas Sohia | Tsitalato | New Bougainville Party |
| Steven Suako | Torokina | Independent |
| John Tabinaman | Mahari | New Bougainville Party |
| Lawrence Uakia | Bolave | Independent |
| Robin Wilson | Terra | New Bougainville Party |
