= Theonila Roka Matbob =

Papua New Guinean politician

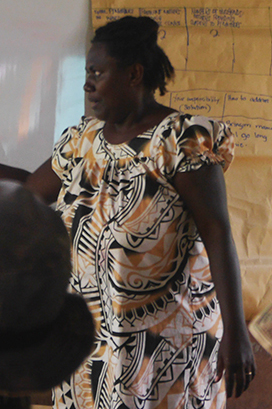
- Matbob in 2019

Minister of Education
- Incumbent
- Assumed office 2 October 2020
- President: Ishmael Toroama

Member of the Bougainville House of Representatives
- Incumbent
- Assumed office 2020
- Preceded by: Michael Lapolela
- Constituency: Ioro

Personal details
- Born: 1990 (age 35–36)

Theonila Roka Matbob (born 1990) is a Bougainvillian politician and Cabinet Minister. She was the second woman in Bougainville to win an open electorate seat in the Bougainville House of Representatives. She won the Goldman Environmental Prize in 2026.

Roka Matbob is from Ioro in Central Bougainville, and grew up during the Bougainville Civil War. She was educated at Divine Word University and the University of Goroka, and subsequently established a counselling and learning centre in Iora.

At the 2020 Bougainvillean general election she contested the seat of Ioro, beating 15 men to win the seat. As minister of education, she was one of two women appointed on 2 October 2020 to the cabinet of the president, Ishmael Toroama, the other being Yolande Geraldine Paul.

In September 2020, she was one of a group of Boungainville villagers who filed a human rights complaint against Rio Tinto over environmental degradation caused by the Panguna mine.
