= Arawa =

Arawa may refer to:

- Arawa (canoe), one of the canoes that carried the ancestral Māori migrants to New Zealand
- Te Arawa, a confederation of Māori tribes in New Zealand
- Arawa, Bougainville, a town in Papua New Guinea
- Arawa Rural LLG, a local-level government area in Papua New Guinea
- Arawá language (extinct) belonging to the Arawan languages
- SS Arawa (1884), a Scottish ocean liner
- SS Esperance Bay, a British ocean liner renamed in 1936 as SS Arawa
