= 2025 Bougainvillean general election =

Election in Bougainville

- 5 September 2025
- Presidential election
- Registered: 238,625
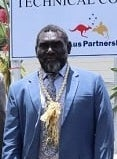

Candidate	Ishmael Toroama	Joe Lera	Sam Kauona
Party	BPAP	NBP	Independent politician
Popular vote	90,448	17,248	13,107
Percentage	64.93%	12.38%	9.41%
President before election
Ishmael Toroama
BPAP
Elected President
Ishmael Toroama
BPAP

General elections were held in the Autonomous Region of Bougainville on 5 September 2025 to elect the president and members of the House of Representatives. It was the first election in Bougainville to be held in a single day. A total of 46 seats were contested in the House of Representatives following the introduction of five single-member constituency seats. Incumbent president Ishmael Toroama was reelected after winning more than 90,000 votes.

== Electoral system ==
On 6 February 2025, the Autonomous Bougainville Government announced that general elections would be held on 4 September 2025. However, a day before the election, Bougainville's electoral commissioner Desmond Tsianai said that voting had been postponed to 5 September 2025, as ballot papers, which had been printed in Port Moresby, were not completed and delivered to Buka constituency on time. Tsianai also cited quality control issues with respect to serial numbers and noted that the final delivery of ballot papers to Bougainville, which had been scheduled on 23 August, was not held until 2 September, leaving regional authorities unable to distribute them to constituencies on time. The postponement will affect all constituencies except Atolls, which would vote as scheduled on 4 September. Additional delays in material caused voting in Central Bougainville to be moved again to 8 September.

Around 238,000 people were eligible to vote in the election.

== Candidates ==
There were seven candidates running for the presidency. A total of 404 candidates ran for seats in the House of Representatives. This included 34 women. Fourteen of them stood in the three seats reserved for women, while 20 others contested open electorates.

=== President ===
- Joe Lera (New Bougainville Party), member of the National Parliament of Papua New Guinea
- Ishmael Toroama (Bougainville People's Alliance Party), incumbent president of Bougainville (since 2020)
- Thomas Raivet (Bougainville United Front Party), former Papua New Guinea Defence Force officer
- Sam Kauona (Independent), former Bougainville Revolutionary Army commander
- Nick Peniai (New Bougainville Party)
- Louis Smit (Independent)
- Wilfred Higei (Independent)

== Conduct ==
Voting was held in 544 polling stations from 8 am to 4 pm Bougainville Standard Time and involved around 3,000 staff. The International Foundation for Electoral Systems deployed observers to monitor the election. Voting was concluded on 8 September following a series of extensions in some constituencies. The electoral commission described the process as smooth and peaceful, with 90% of polling stations opening on time.

Ballot-counting was scheduled from 9 to 21 September. However, Bougainville Attorney-General Ezekiel Massat announced that counting was moved to 11 September due to disruptions caused by bad weather. Due to the late arrival of ballot boxes from five provinces, vote-counting finally began on 12 September.

== Results ==
Vote counting began a week after the election took place, with results expected by 22 September 2025. On 22 September, the Office of Bougainville's Electoral Commission (OBEC) announced that the release of the results would not be finished until 6 October, citing insufficient time and logistical delays in counting.

Preliminary results released on 22 September showed incumbent president Ishmael Toroama leading by nearly 70,000 votes. By 29 September, he had been reelected president with more than 90,000 votes. All 45 seats in the House of Representatives were declared by 4 October. Toroama was inaugurated for his second term as president on 6 October.

Bougainville presidential election, 2025
Party	Candidate	Votes	%
BPAP	Ishmael Toroama (incumbent)	90,448	64.93%
NBP	Joe Lera	17,248	12.38%
Independent	Sam Kauona	13,107	9.41%
Bougainville United Front Party	Thomas Raivet	6,775	4.86%
NBP	Nick Peniai	5,588	4.01%
Independent	Louis Smit	5,182	3.72%
Independent	Wilfred Higei	944	0.68%
Total votes		139,292	100.00%
