= Rose Pihei =

Politician

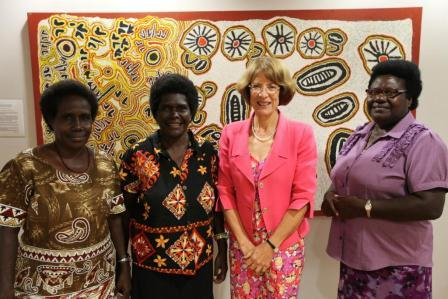
- Pihei (second from left) with the Australian High Commissioner and other Bougainville MPs

Member of the Bougainville House of Representatives
- Incumbent
- Assumed office 2025
- Constituency: South Bougainville

Member of the Bougainville House of Representatives
- In office 2010–2015
- Succeeded by: Isabel Peta
- Constituency: South Bougainville

Rose Pihei is a politician in the Autonomous Region of Bougainville in Papua New Guinea. She was a member of the Bougainville House of Representatives from 2010 to 2015, representing the South Bougainville (Women's) constituency.

Prior to entering politics, Pihei had been a secretary in the provincial government, operated a printing and secretarial business, and served as a community worker in her Konnou area of Buin district. She was a founding member of the Bougainville Women's Federation and had been president for its South Bougainville sub-region. She was first ielected to the House of Representatives at the June 2010 election, defeating Laura Ampa.

Following the 2010 election, President John Momis initially appointed Joan Jerome to the women's reserved position in the ministry; however, she failed to get support from the three-member women's caucus, which endorsed Pihei. Pihei was then appointed Minister for Community, Women and Youth in June 2010. In October 2012, she was shifted to Minister for Culture and Tourism in a reshuffle following the death of minister Joseph Egilio. In September 2014, she was shifted to Minister for Health. As Minister for Health, she raised concern about the mental health consequences of the Bougainville conflict and the need to provide services. She recontested her seat at the 2015 election, but was defeated.

After her defeat, Pihei remained in public life as President of the Bougainville Women's Forum. She unsuccessfully contested the 2017 national election for the Social Democratic Party.

In the 2025 Bougainvillean general election, Pihei regained her former Bougainville South seat. She serves as deputy speaker.
