= 2005 Bougainvillean general election =

The inaugural of the presidential and the parliamentary elections were held in the Autonomous Region of Bougainville in Papua New Guinea from 20 May to 9 June 2005. Considered fair, peaceful and successful, the elections resulted in Joseph Kabui becoming the first President of the Autonomous Region of Bougainville.

== Background ==
The 2001 Bougainville Peace Agreement, which brought an end to the Bougainville conflict, established the Autonomous Bougainville Government and paved the way for the drafting of a constitution. Writs were issued on 15 April with nominations closing on 21 April. The election received the support and participation of most former independence fighters. The Papua New Guinea government provided US$3.7 million to the Autonomous Bougainville Government to run the election, and it was agreed to temporarily move the provincial capital to Buka after the previous capital Arawa was largely destroyed during the conflict.

Elections were for the President and 39 members of the Bougainville House of Representatives elected in first past the post constituencies, including three seats reserved for women and three reserved for former combatants. The Speaker of the House would be selected after the election from outside parliament, bringing the total number of members to 41. Four parties were recognised as contesting the election: Bougainville People's Congress, New Bougainville Party, Bougainville Independence Movement, and Bougainville Labour Party; with a total of 235 candidates standing across the 33 general constituencies and 53 candidates standing across the 6 special constituencies. There were approximately 122,000 eligible voters out of a total population of around 180,000.

== Campaign ==
=== Presidential candidates ===
Five candidates contested the presidential election: Joseph Kabui, John Momis, James Tanis, Joel Banam and Bartholomew Kigina.

Joseph Kabui, a former separatist fighter with the Bougainville Revolutionary Army, led the Bougainville People's Congress. He was hospitalised during the campaign for an ongoing heart problem. Kabui emphasised that his main priority was the implementation of the Bougainville Peace Agreement and the Bougainville Constitution. Kabui also argued that Bougainville's chiefs should be more involved in the government, suggesting similar formalised councils to those in Vanuatu and Fiji, in order to promote grassroots input. Kabui also said that a resumption in copper mining, which had been a major cause of the island's conflict, should be seriously considered, but that a referendum should be held before mining was allowed to resume.

John Momis formed and led the New Bougainville Party. The incumbent Governor of Bougainville, Momis resigned his post after 34 years in the Papua New Guinea government to contest the election and run for President of Bougainville. Momis was criticised by Kabui for resigning from his elected role, but argued that in the national government he had always pushed for decentralisation, and with the election of an Autonomous Bougainville Government his work at a national level was complete. Momis said he aimed to form a consensus-style government on Bougainville after the election, and to build a sense of unity on the island, such as through awareness programs to involve youth in development. Momis said that calls to lift a moratorium on mining exploration were to "signal to the world that Bougainville has a responsible government in place which wants to be fiscally self-reliant, and wants to attract responsible foreign investors", though also stated mining would have to wait until the government administration was well established.

James Tanis was formerly the deputy leader of Bougainville People's Congress, but founded the Bougainville Independence Movement party to contest the election. Joel Banam was Chairman of the Leitana Council of Elders; Bartholomew Kigina hailed from Buin in South Bougainville.

=== Women's electorates ===
Under the Bougainville Constitution, three parliamentary seats were reserved to be contested exclusively by female candidates – electorates for North, South and Central Bougainville Districts. 25 candidates stood in these three electorates, while a further 28 stood in general electorates. Leitana Nehan Women's Development Agency expected female candidates to be successful in the election due to the low number of patrilineal communities in Bougainville, and the significant contributions women had made to the peace process.

Women's rights groups expected that female elected representatives would work for law changes around violence against women and the protection of children. These groups reported an increasing trend of sexual violence against children by male family members in Bougainville. Theresa Jaindong, interim Health Minister and a candidate for the Central Bougainville Women's seat, called for government support to resettle those displaced by the conflict, including around 20,000 displaced people living in Arawa. She argued that the displacement had broken down family structures and needed to be resolved.

=== Francis Ona and the 'No Go Zone' ===
The Bougainville Revolutionary Army (BRA) agreed to the elections in the Bougainville Peace Agreement in 2001. However, BRA founder Francis Ona rejected the Agreement, and split from the group. Ona declared the unrecognised Kingdom of Me'ekamui in the central region of the island that his forces controlled, which became known as the 'No Go Zone' as local authorities were unable to enter.

In March, Ona agreed not to disrupt the election, and the UN Observer Mission reported significant numbers among Ona's Me'ekamui Defence Force were willing to participate in the election. However, on 22 March Ona emerged from the No Go Zone for the first time in 16 years to make a speech to a crowd of about 150 people in Arawa, calling for Australia and Papua New Guinea to recognise the independence of Bougainville as Me'ekamui and leave the island. Australian and UN officials on the island acknowledged Ona's statement but refused to leave. A week later Ona held a second rally to a crowd of 200, rejecting the legitimacy of the vote for an autonomous government on the grounds that Bougainville had already declared independence.

Governor John Momis criticised police for allowing Ona to hold the rallies, claiming that Ona's supporters had brought guns. Momis and Deputy Governor Gerard Sinato alleged that Australian nationals, described as 'two fugitives', were influencing Ona to disrupt the election and had accompanied him to the rallies. Momis and Sinato called for police to take stronger action to deport the Australians.

Government figures raised concerns Ona's activities would disrupt the election, and Momis called a meeting of Bougainvillean leaders in response. Momis emphasised that public attitude in Bougainville was strongly against Ona's attempts to disrupt the election, and suggested arming former combatants that were supportive of the election to counteract Ona's forces. On 5 April chiefs representing the Leitana Council of Elders, John Momis and Joseph Kabui unanimously issued a call for Ona to join the peace process and rebuffing his rejection of the election.

Joseph Kabui met with former militants in the No Go Zone and claimed they had agreed to support the election, rather than supporting Ona's stance. The Me'ekamui Defence Forces eventually agreed to participate in the election, with people living in the No Go Zone enrolling to vote and Me'ekamui candidates contesting the election. Ona endorsed Joseph Kabui in the presidential election. Voting eventually took place peacefully and successfully in the No Go Zone around the Panguna mine area.

== Results ==
=== President ===
Joseph Kabui was elected as the first President of the Autonomous Region of Bougainville ahead of second-place candidate John Momis with 20,000 votes. The 14,000 vote margin was considered a "landslide", with Momis at slightly under 30% of votes trailing Kabui's more than 60% of votes during the count.

During the election, Momis alleged that thousands of Bougainvilleans had been excluded from voting as their names were not on the electoral rolls, threatening to seek a legal injunction to stop the count. Election manager Mathias Pihei acknowledged that some had been excluded due to hasty composition of rolls, but argued the roll was still sufficient for the election. Ballot counting experienced delays due to technical difficulties. Momis alleged major irregularities in the results, particularly in the Central and South Bougainville Districts. Momis alleged that Kabui and Pihei had colluded to produce a fraudulent election result, and claimed the number of votes in several polling locations was greater than the number of eligible voters on the electoral roll.

Kabui and Pihei denied these claims, saying Momis could not accept defeat graciously, with Kabui arguing that the alleged deception could not be carried out covertly in a tight-knit community such as Bougainville. The election was monitored by international observers including from New Zealand, the Pacific Islands Forum and the Commonwealth of Nations, who considered it to be transparently and competently conducted.

Candidate	Party	Votes	%
Joseph Kabui	Bougainville People's Congress	37,928	54.66
John Momis	New Bougainville Party	23,861	34.39
James Tanis	Bougainville Independence Movement	7,596	10.95
Joel Banam		7,596	10.95
Bartholomew Kigina		7,596	10.95
Total		69,385	100.00
Source: The Age

=== House of Representatives ===
Alongside Kabui as president, the Bougainville People's Congress secured 14 further seats out of 40 in the Bougainville House of Representatives, and claimed to have the support of 20 further independents, with Kabui contemplating forming a super coalition. Kabui was sworn in as the first President of the Autonomous Region of Bougainville on 10 June, alongside vice president Joseph Watawi from Selau constituency and women's deputy Magdalene Toroansi from the Central Bougainville women's constituency. This caretaker Cabinet was sworn in in the former capital Arawa, so that rural people on the main island would be able to attend rather than travelling to Buka Island for the full governmental inauguration the next week. Nick Peniai was appointed the Speaker of the House.
