= Amanda Masono Getsi =

Politician in Autonomous Region of Bougainville

Bougainville House of Representatives
- Incumbent
- Assumed office 2020
- Preceded by: Francesca Semoso
- Constituency: Women's (South)

Personal details
- Parent: Raymond Masono (father)

Amanda Masono Getsi is a member of the House of Representatives in the Autonomous Region of Bougainville in Papua New Guinea (PNG).

== Early life ==
Amanda Masono Getsi is from the Carteret Islands, located to the north-east of Bougainville Island. They are part of the Buka District of the Autonomous Region of Bougainville. Her father is Raymond Masono, who was vice-president of the Autonomous Region from 2017 to 2020 in the government of John Momis. She obtained an undergraduate degree from the University of Papua New Guinea in 2008.

== Career ==
After graduating, Getsi spent five years working for PNG's Division of Law and Justice, before studying for a master's of law from the University of Melbourne in Australia, which she obtained in 2017. Returning to Bougainville, she played an important role in preparations for the Bougainville Referendum Commission, being appointed director of the referendum. The Commission was established in 2018 under the chairmanship of the former Taoiseach of Ireland, Bertie Ahern, to supervise the non-binding referendum on independence from PNG. Held in 2019, the referendum resulted in a 98.31% vote in favour of independence. During the referendum, Getsi worked as External Relations Manager, supporting the media, observers and scrutineers.

In the September 2020 elections in the Autonomous Region of Bougainville, Getsi ran for election for the Bougainville Northern Region women's seat, one of three seats that are reserved for women in Bougainville's parliament. She was elected, as was her father.
