= Carolyn Poli =

Papua New Guinean politician

Carolyn Poli is a Papua New Guinean politician who was elected to the Bougainville House of Representatives (BHOR) in 2022. She is vice-chair of the BHOR Gender Equality and Human Rights Committee.

== Biography ==
Poli was elected to Fourth Parliament (2020–2025) of the Bougainville House of Representatives (BHOR), the legislature of the Autonomous Region of Bougainville in Papa New Guinea, during a by-election for an Open Seat in 2022. She is the fifth woman to be elected to the House of Representatives. She is vice-chair of the BHOR Gender Equality and Human Rights Committee.

In 2024, Poli was among the politicians at the Second Joint Parliamentary Women’s Caucus which launched a strategic plan to get more women elected to parliament in Papa New Guinea. The meeting was facilitated by the United Nations Development Programme (UNDP).
