= Yolande Geraldine Paul =

Government minister in Autonomous Region of Bougainville

Yolande Geraldine Paul is the Minister of Primary Industries and Marine Resources for the Autonomous Region of Bougainville in Papua New Guinea (PNG).

== Early life ==
Paul grew up in what was then the North Solomons Province of Papua New Guinea. During the Bougainville conflict, when the province tried to break away from PNG, she moved first to the Solomon Islands to continue her education, then to mainland Papua New Guinea and then to Australia. Upon returning to PNG, Paul worked with the Family and Sexual Violence Action Committee (FSVAC) until 2011 addressing gender-based violence, together with locally based civil society organizations (CSOs) around the country.

== Return to Bougainville ==
In 2011 Paul returned to the, by then, Autonomous Region of Bougainville. She became well-known in Bougainville for her work on a World Bank-funded project to reinvigorate the cocoa industry. This saw more than three million cocoa trees replanted or rejuvenated. Her popularity as a result of the cocoa project enabled her to easily win the Central Region Women's seat in the September 2020 Bougainvillean general election. Ishmael Toroama, who was elected president at the same time, then appointed her as Minister of Primary Industries. She was one of two women to be appointed to the 15-person cabinet, the other being Theonila Roka Matbob, who was made Minister of Education. Paul's husband, Morris Opeti, was also elected to the parliament. He had become famous as a result of his victory in 2015 in a television singing contest, called Vocal Fusion.
