= 2021 in Easter Island =

- Decades
- See also: Other events of 2021; Timeline of Rapa Nui history

Events from 2021 in Easter Island.

== Events ==
Ongoing – COVID-19 pandemic in Easter Island

- 29 January – The Tapati Festival is held without visitors for the first time.
- 25 October – Easter Islanders vote against reopening the island to tourists in a referendum.
