= 2020 in Easter Island =

- Decades
- See also: Other events of 2020; Timeline of Rapa Nui history

Events from 2020 in Easter Island.

== Events ==
Ongoing – COVID-19 pandemic in Easter Island

- 19 March – The local government ordered a lockdown of the island and requested LATAM Airlines to evacuate all tourists on the island.
- 24 March – The first case of COVID-19 on the island was confirmed.
