= 2022 in Easter Island =

- Decades
- See also: Other events of 2022; Timeline of Rapa Nui history

Events from 2022 in Easter Island.

== Events ==
Ongoing – COVID-19 pandemic in Easter Island

- 21 May – The Ministry of economy, development and tourism announces that Easter Island will reopen on 1 August after being closed to tourists for two years during the COVID-19 pandemic.
- 1 August – Easter Island reopens to tourists.
