= Josephine Getsi =

Politician in the Autonomous Region of Bougainville

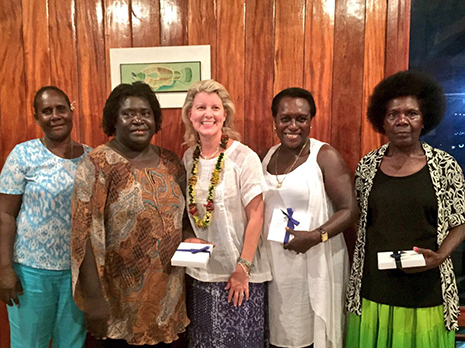
Getsi (right) with fellow MPs and Natasha Stott Despoja

Josephine Getsi is a politician in the Autonomous Region of Bougainville. She has been a member of the Bougainville House of Representatives since 2015, representing the constituency of Peit. She nominated as an independent, but had "extensive support" from the governing New Bougainville Party. She was the first woman to win an open seat in the House and was the Minister for Community Development in the government of John Momis.

Getsi is from Hapan Village, Solos in Buka. She had a long career as a teacher in Peit before entering politics. She was also the president of the Catholic Women's Association in Peit and the Peit representative for the Bougainville Women's Federation. Getsi's successful candidacy for Peit at the 2015 election marked the first time a woman had contested the constituency, and she faced resistance in her campaign from men who felt that women should only contest the seats reserved for them. She had also campaigned against perceived local corruption and the records of former members, having labelled Peit "the most corrupt constituency" during her campaign.
