= COVID-19 pandemic in Norfolk Island =

Viral pandemic in Norfolk Island

- Disease: COVID-19
- Pathogen: SARS-CoV-2
- Location: Norfolk Island
- First outbreak: Wuhan, China
- Arrival date: 30 December 2021
- Confirmed cases: 1,051
- Deaths: 0
- Fatality rate: 0%
- Vaccinations: 1,727 (fully vaccinated)

The COVID-19 pandemic in Norfolk Island was part of the worldwide pandemic of coronavirus disease 2019 (COVID-19) caused by severe acute respiratory syndrome coronavirus 2 (SARS-CoV-2). The virus was confirmed to have reached Norfolk Island on December 30, 2021.

== Background ==
On 12 January 2020, the World Health Organization (WHO) confirmed that a novel coronavirus was the cause of a respiratory illness in a cluster of people in Wuhan City, Hubei Province, China, which was reported to the WHO on 31 December 2019.

The case fatality ratio for COVID-19 has been much lower than SARS of 2003, but the transmission has been significantly greater, with a significant total death toll.

== Timeline ==
In March 2020, as a precautionary measure, the Norfolk Island Regional Council imposed a 32-day travel ban and declared a state of emergency. Administrator Eric Hutchinson stated that the measures were necessary due to the remote island's extremely limited health capacity. Lockdown measures began to be lifted from 6 May 2020.

Following outbreaks in the Australian Eastern States and Territories in mid-2021, Norfolk islands implemented further restrictions. COVID-19 support packages were made available for Norfolk Island businesses and residents. COVID-19 was confirmed to have reached Norfolk Island on December 30, 2021.

By January 26, 2022, 75 cases had been confirmed, with only one recovered. The cases were confirmed to be the Omicron variant of the corona virus. Cases continued to spread for the remainder of the year. By mid October 2022, cases had reached a total of 1,051 and no deaths had occurred. As the community infections had seemingly plateaued and the majority of the population had been vaccinated against COVID-19, the health authority ended all restrictions and health directions related to the pandemic in alignment with the lifting of measures in Queensland, Australia.

== Vaccination ==
Vaccinations started in August 2021. By February 10, 2022, 1,705 residents had received their first dose, 1,727 had received their second, and 1,244 had received a booster shot. A further 103 children aged 5–11 years had also received their first dose.

== See also ==
- COVID-19 pandemic in Oceania.
