= Joe Lera =

Papua New Guinean politician

The Honourable Joe Lera MP

Member of the National Parliament of Papua New Guinea
- In office 2012 – 17 June 2020
- Constituency: Bougainville Regional

Personal details
- Party: United Resources Party

Joe Lera (born 18 January 1961) is a politician who was a Papua New Guinean parliamentarian from 2012 to 2020. He was a United Resources Party member of the National Parliament of Papua New Guinea, representing the Bougainville Regional seat. Although regional members generally assume the position of Governor, due to the existence of the devolved Autonomous Bougainville Government Lera was referred to as the "Regional Member for Bougainville". He was Minister for Bougainville Affairs in the government of Peter O'Neill.

Lera is from Siwai in South Bougainville. He trained as a teacher at Vunakanau in East New Britain before returning to Bougainville to work as a teacher in 1976. Lera undertook adult matriculation at the University of Papua New Guinea, studied a Bachelor of Education degree at UPNG and Macquarie University in Australia before studying a master's degree in education at UPNG and the University of Goroka. He worked for the UPNG Open College flexible learning system for fifteen years, with his roles including director of their Buka campus and associate director professional and continuing education of the OC system, based at the main campus in Port Moresby. In 2007, he left the Open College system to be southern region commissioner for the Autonomous Bougainville Government, taking a significant pay cut.

As an ABG commissioner, he initially oversaw the construction of government office accommodation and housing at Buin in South Bougainville, but faced major challenges in relation to water supply, power supply to Buin township, and a lack of roadmaking machinery in response to maintenance requests. By 2009, he reported that he had "completed 310 projects", including "61 feeder roads and 249 projects in primary schools, health centres, law and justice centres, school staff houses, aid posts, a successful cocoa pod-borer awareness throughout the districts, coffee workshops, sports, community outreach projects, long term impact projects that are still in progress and workshops to help the rural villagers on daily hygiene these were in the districts of Buin, Siwai and Bana." He subsequently left the ABG, and was chief executive director of Oil Search's community development division.

Lera was elected to the National Parliament at the 2012 election, winning the Bougainville Regional seat for the United Resources Party. He sought to shift the Open College campus from Buka to a temporary campus at Arawa in Central Bougainville and use the existing Buka facilities for a higher education institute catering to all seven Papua New Guinean universities. He also attempted to convince other institutions to open Bougainville campuses, claiming success when the International Training Institute opened their Kokopau campus in Buka. In September 2013, he signed an agreement with Digicel on improving telecommunications services on Bougainville. By July 2014, he won landowner approval for a revised polytechnic institution, the "Bougainville Higher Education, Science and Technology Institute", to be located at Manetai, with the site reportedly being levelled for construction in mid-2015.

In April 2016, Lera was appointed Minister for Bougainville Affairs in the government of Peter O'Neill. In June, he fulfilled a commitment to reimburse the Java Community for the cost of restoring the Java Bridge near Panguna. On June 17, 2020, Lera resigned to contest the 2020 Autonomous Bougainville elections where he finished in sixth place.

National Parliament of Papua New Guinea
Preceded by Fidelis Semoso	Member for Bougainville Regional; 2012–2020	Incumbent
