= 2021 Easter Island tourism referendum =

24 October 2021
- Do you agree with the opening of the island in February 2022?

Results
Choice	Votes	%
Yes	2,924	70.25%
No	1,238	29.75%
Valid votes	4,162	99.71%
Invalid or blank votes	12	0.29%
Total votes	4,174	100.00%
Registered voters/turnout	4,174	100%

A referendum on reopening for tourism was held in Easter Island on 24 October 2021. Despite the importance of tourism to the island's economy, the proposal was rejected by 66% of voters. Voter turnout was around 20%.

== Background ==
The island was closed to visitors from 16 March 2020 due to the COVID-19 pandemic. Following the closure, there were only eight cases of COVID recorded (and no deaths), with the last case in September 2020.

In October 2021 Ma'u Henu (the organisation responsible for running the island's parks) organised a referendum amongst the indigenous population on whether the island should reopen to tourists in January 2022. Although the vote was consultative, the island authorities stated that they would respect the result.

== Results ==
Do you want to open the island to tourists in January?
Choice	Votes	%
For	320	33.02
Against	649	66.98
Total	969	100.00
Valid votes	969	99.69
Invalid/blank votes	3	0.31
Total votes	972	100.00
Source: Direct Democracy
