= Sam Akoitai =

Papua New Guinean politician

Member of the National Parliament for Central Bougainville
- In office 2018–2021
- Preceded by: Jimmy Miringtoro
- Succeeded by: Simon Dumarinu
- In office 1997–2007
- Preceded by: Joseph Egilio
- Succeeded by: Jimmy Miringtoro

Personal details
- Born: May 5, 1961 Wakunai, Bougainville District, Territory of Papua and New Guinea
- Died: December 17, 2021 (aged 60) Autonomous Region of Bougainville, Papua New Guinea

Sam Akoitai (5 May 1961 – 17 December 2021) was a Papua New Guinean politician from the Autonomous Region of Bougainville. He served as Member of Parliament for Central Bougainville from 1997 to 2007 and from 2018 until his death in 2021.

Akoitai was a veteran of the Bougainville conflict. In 1991, he became the political leader of the Bougainville Resistance Force (BRF). The BRF was formed to defend civilians from war crimes committed by the secessionists; as such, it aligned with the Papua New Guinea Defence Force. Because of a loose chain of command, some factions of the BRF engaged in criminal activities and even committed war crimes, which Akoitai condemned. In 1997, upon civilian request, Akoitai disarmed the faction of the BRF under his control. A prominent figure during the peace process, he was one of the signatories to the 2001 Bougainville Peace Agreement.

== Early life ==
Sam Akoitai was born in Wakunai, Bougainville, on 5 May 1961. He is from the village of Togarau in Wakunai. Akoitai attended the community schools in the villages of Ruruvu and Iagama before completing Grade 10 at Hutjena High School. In 1978, he began to work for Bougainville Copper Limited (BCL), which operated the Panguna mine. After resigning in 1986, Akoitai was self-employed.

== Military career ==
In 1988, the Bougainville Revolutionary Army (BRA) began the Bougainville conflict, seeking the closure of the Panguna mine and Bougainville's secession from Papua New Guinea. The BRA had a loose chain of command and some factions committed war crimes against Bougainvillean civilians. Various armed groups formed to defend civilians from the BRA. These groups coalesced into the Bougainville Resistance Force (BRF). The BRF fought with the Papua New Guinea Defence Force (PNGDF) against the BRA. Sam Akoitai began fighting in the conflict in 1990. He became the leader of the BRF in 1991 and its chairman in 1992. During the conflict, the BRA abducted Akoitai and murdered several members of his family.

The BRF suffered from the same problems as the BRA. A loose chain of command resulted in a lack of accountability, enabling some factions to perpetrate war crimes against civilians. Akoitai was the formal chairman of the BRF, based on Buka Island, but allegiances were locally based. In 1996, Akoitai said that "if any resistance members have been involved in any of the killings and massacres, they must face the full fire of the law and I am not going to stand up for them. The laws of this country must be exercised". In January 1997, Akoitai disarmed the faction of the BRF under his control, the one which operated in Wakunai, upon request from the civilian population.

== Political career ==
In the June 1997 Papua New Guinean general election, Sam Akoitai was elected Member of Parliament for Central Bougainville. Akoitai pressured Bill Skate to support the peace talks being held at Burnham Military Camp in New Zealand. In exchange, Akoitai supported him in assuming the role of Prime Minister. Skate appointed Akoitai as Minister for Bougainville Affairs, and Akoitai played a prominent role in the peace process and reconciliation between the BRA and the BRF.

In 1999, Akoitai moved from Bougainville Affairs to enter the State Ministry, but lost that position when Skate lost office to Mekere Morauta on 14 July. Later on, Akoitai served on the Broadcasting of Parliamentary Proceedings Committee, Privileges Committees in November 1999, and as the Deputy Chairman of the Plans and Estimates Committee from November 1999 to December 2000.

Akoitai retained his seat in the June 2002 general election. On 5 August, the prime minister-elect Michael Somare appointed him Minister responsible for Mining, Environment, Conservation and Correctional Institution Services. On 13 August 13, Akoitai became Minister for Mining.

After losing his seat in 2007, Akoitai ran in the 2008 Bougainvillean presidential election. He was opposed to a deal that President Joseph Kabui had struck with the company Invisible Resources before his death. The company had obtained exclusive rights to mineral exploration on Bougainville outside the interests of Rio Tinto on the island. Akoitai said that almost everyone in the places he campaigned in wanted the deal to be rescinded. Akoitai finished second in the election. James Tanis defeated him by almost 2,000 votes. Akoitai alleged that some people's names were not included on the election rolls, as did some voters.

In the 2017 general election, Akoitai ran for his former seat as an independent candidate. Simon Dumarinu was declared the winner, but Akoitai filed an election petition. After a recount in 2018, it was found that Akoitai had received 7,257 votes, four more than Dumarinu. Akoitai was sworn in on 20 April 2018.

== Personal life ==
Akoitai had two children.

== Death ==
Akoitai died on 17 December 2021.
