= UTC+11:00 =

Identifier for a time offset from UTC of +11

- Time zone
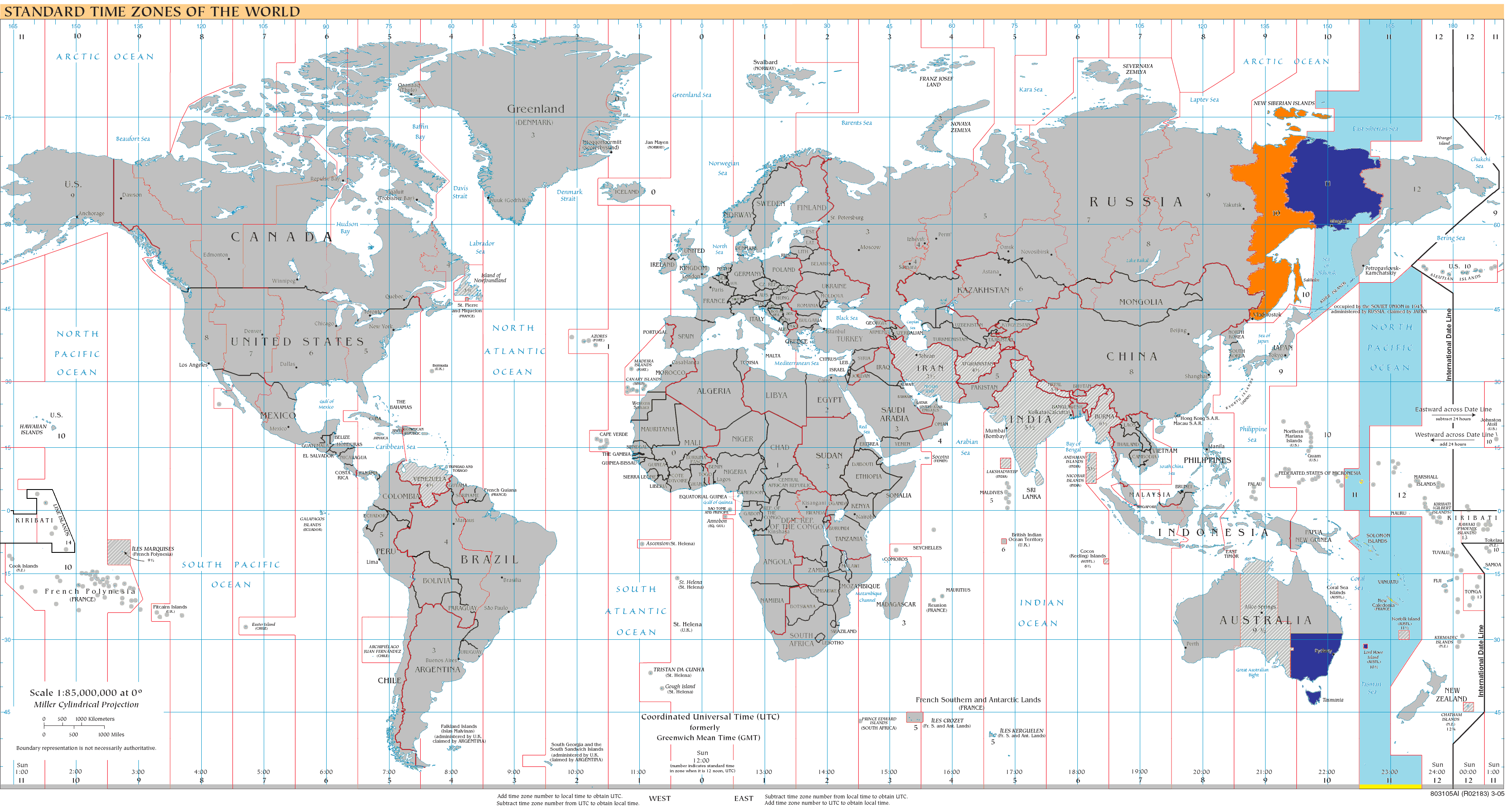
- World map with the time zone highlighted

UTC offset
- UTC: UTC+11:00

Current time
- 23:43, 31 May 2026 UTC+11:00 [refresh]

Central meridian
- 165 degrees E

Date-time group
- L

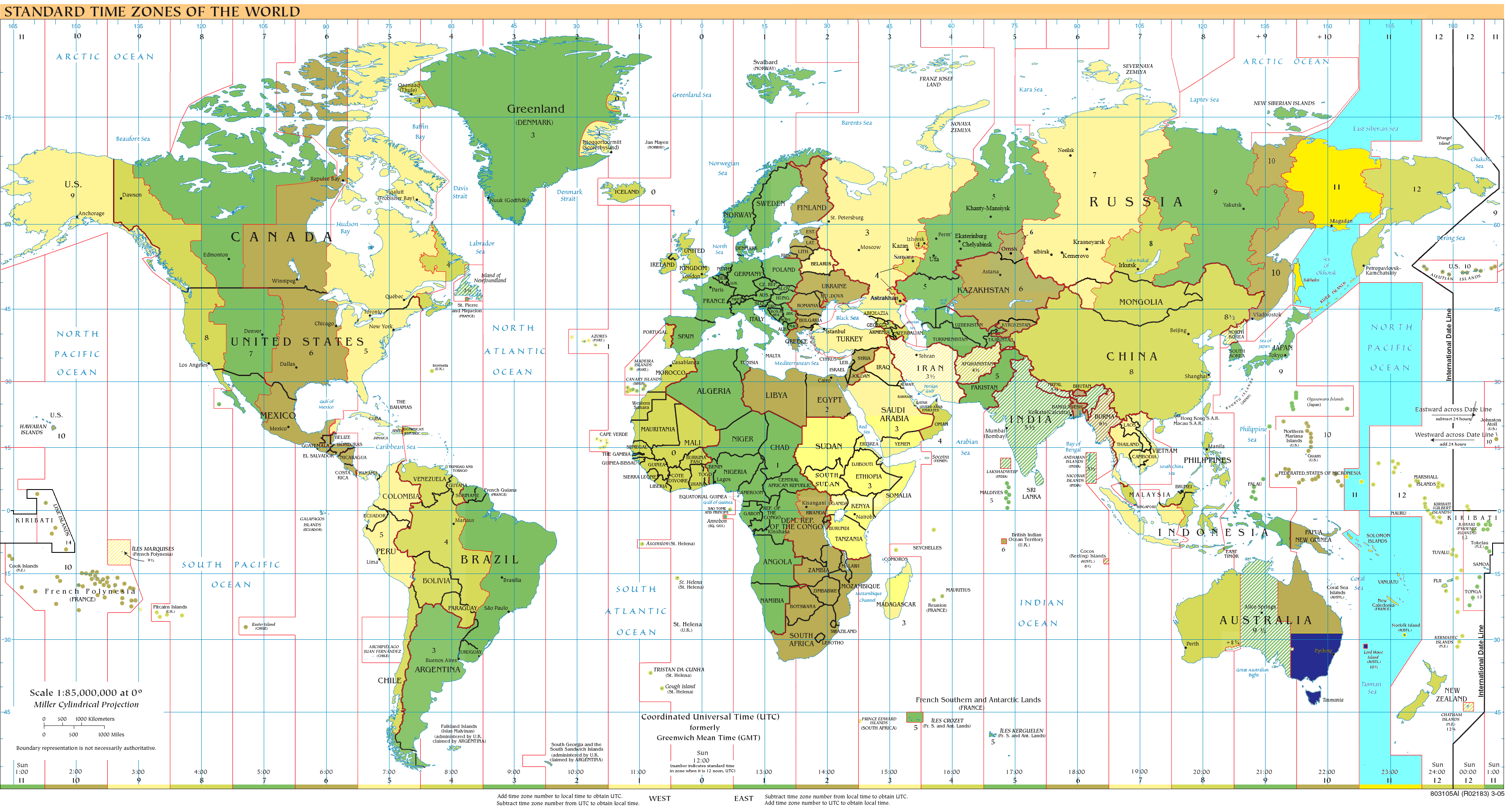
UTC+11:00: blue (December), orange (June), yellow (year-round), light blue (sea areas)

Time in Russia: KALT / Kaliningrad Time / UTC+2 / (MSK−1); MSK / Moscow Time / UTC+3 / (MSK±0); SAMT / Samara Time / UTC+4 / (MSK+1); YEKT / Yekaterinburg Time / UTC+5 / (MSK+2); OMST / Omsk Time / UTC+6 / (MSK+3); KRAT / Krasnoyarsk Time / UTC+7 / (MSK+4); IRKT / Irkutsk Time / UTC+8 / (MSK+5); YAKT / Yakutsk Time / UTC+9 / (MSK+6); VLAT / Vladivostok Time / UTC+10 / (MSK+7); MAGT / Magadan Time / UTC+11 / (MSK+8); PETT / Kamchatka Time / UTC+12 / (MSK+9)

Time in Australia: Standard / DST / Zone; UTC+08:00 (year round) / / Western Time; UTC+09:30 (year round) / / Central Time; UTC+09:30 / UTC+10:30 / Central Time; UTC+10:00 (year round) / / Eastern Time; UTC+10:00 / UTC+11:00 / Eastern Time; UTC+10:30 / UTC+11:00 / Lord Howe Island

UTC+11:00 is an identifier for a time offset from UTC of +11:00. This time is used in:

== As standard time (year-round) ==
Principal cities: Arawa, Buka, Honiara, Magadan, Nouméa, Palikir, Port Vila, Tofol, and Yuzhno-Sakhalinsk.

=== North Asia ===
- Russia – Magadan Time
  - Far Eastern Federal District
    - Magadan Oblast, Sakhalin Oblast, and the Sakha Republic (eastern part of the Sakha Republic (including Abyysky, Allaikhovsky, Momsky, Nizhnekolymsky, Srednekolymsky and Verkhnekolymsky); Oymyakonsky, Ust-Yansky, and Verkhoyansky districts)

=== Oceania ===
==== Melanesia ====
- France
  - New Caledonia
- Papua New Guinea
  - Bougainville only (except for other regions)
    - North Bougainville District
    - Central Bougainville District
    - South Bougainville District
- Solomon Islands
- Vanuatu

==== Micronesia ====
- Federated States of Micronesia
  - Kosrae
  - Pohnpei

== As standard time (Southern Hemisphere winter) ==
Principal towns: Burnt Pine and Kingston.

=== Oceania ===
- Australia
  - Macquarie Island
  - Norfolk Island

== As daylight saving time (Southern Hemisphere summer) ==
Principal cities: Canberra, Hobart, Melbourne, and Sydney.

=== Oceania ===
- Australia – Australian Eastern Daylight Saving Time (AEDT)
  - Australian Capital Territory
  - Jervis Bay Territory
  - New South Wales (except Broken Hill and its surrounds, as well as Lord Howe Island)
  - Tasmania
  - Victoria

== Discrepancies between official UTC+11:00 and geographical UTC+11:00 ==
=== Areas in UTC+11:00 longitudes using other time zones ===
Using UTC+10:30:

- Australia
  - Lord Howe Island (standard time)

Using UTC+12:00:

- Marshall Islands
- Nauru
- Russia
  - The western part of Chukotka Autonomous Okrug
  - Kamchatka Krai
- United States
  - Wake Island

Using UTC+12:00 and DST UTC+13:00:

- New Zealand
  - The most part of South Island

=== Areas outside UTC+11:00 longitudes using UTC+11:00 time ===
==== Areas between 127°30′ E and 157°30′ E ("Physical" UTC+09:00 and UTC+10:00) ====
- Papua New Guinea
  - Autonomous Region of Bougainville, except island in very east
- Russia
  - The most part of Magadan Oblast
  - Sakhalin Oblast
    - Russian territory of Kuril Islands
    - Sakhalin Island (partly within the "physical" UTC+09:00 area)
  - The eastern part of Sakha Republic (partly within the "physical" UTC+09:00 area)
- Solomon Islands
  - Shortland Islands
  - Choiseul, with an exception in very east
  - The western part of New Georgia Islands

== See also ==
- Time in Australia
- Time in Russia
