= Charry Napto =

Bougainvillean politician

The Honourable Charry Napto

Minister of Health of Bougainville
- In office July 2, 2021 – July 17, 2021
- President: Ishmael Toroama
- Preceded by: Raymond Masono
- Succeeded by: Thomas Tarii
- Disappeared: July 17, 2021; Pacific Ocean, en route to Nissan Island from Buka, Bougainville

Charry Napto (disappeared July 17, 2021) was a Bougainvillean politician who served as its Minister of Health during the time of his disappearance. Napto was appointed as Minister of Community Government by President Dr. John Momis on January 6, 2020. On July 2, 2021, Napto became the Minister of Health after the recent death of Raymond Masono, the previous minister of health. On July 17, Napto, his wife, and his son was travelling to Nissan Island via banana boat. The boat had an accident, with only one survivor. The other six passengers, including Napto and his family, were never found.
