= COVID-19 pandemic in Papua New Guinea =

- Disease: COVID-19
- Pathogen: SARS-CoV-2
- Location: Papua New Guinea
- First outbreak: Wuhan, China
- Index case: Lae
- Arrival date: 20 March 2020
- Confirmed cases: 46,864
- Deaths: 670
- Fatality rate: 1.43%
- Vaccinations: 321,192 (fully vaccinated)

Government website
- PNG Government Official COVID-19 Website

The COVID-19 pandemic in Papua New Guinea was part of the worldwide pandemic of coronavirus disease 2019 (COVID-19) caused by severe acute respiratory syndrome coronavirus 2 (SARS-CoV-2). The virus was confirmed to have reached Papua New Guinea on 20 March 2020. On 4 May 2020, Papua New Guinea was declared COVID-19 free. However, on 20 June, the government confirmed another case of COVID-19, meaning that the disease was present again within the country.

Until early 2021, the country managed to stave off a major COVID-19 outbreak, with only 1,275 cases reported at the end of February according to Johns Hopkins University. In March, cases tripled, with Prime Minister James Marape speaking of "rampant community transmission". By early May, the number of hospitalizations in the capital Port Moresby stabilized, but delays in receiving test results from regional areas were a concern. In mid May, as the reasons for the apparent easing of the pandemic situation remained uncertain, discrepancies between government figures and higher ones from the provinces led to concerns that hundreds of COVID-19 cases had been missed in the national tally.

By March 2022, Papua New Guinea had a total of 41,533 cumulative cases and 639 deaths and a vaccination rate of 3.5% – one of the lowest in the world.

== Background ==
On 12 January 2020, the World Health Organization (WHO) confirmed that a novel coronavirus was the cause of a respiratory illness in a cluster of people in Wuhan, Hubei, China, which was reported to the WHO on 31 December 2019.

The case fatality ratio for COVID-19 has been much lower than SARS of 2003, but the transmission has been significantly greater, with a significant total death toll.

The pandemic posed a major strain on the health system in Papua New Guinea, which has been described by experts as poor. The presence of malaria, multidrug-resistant tuberculosis and other illnesses was seen by experts as compounding the impact of the pandemic. In April 2020, the country had only about 500 doctors, less than 4,000 nurses, below 3,000 community health workers, and about 5,000 bed spaces in hospitals. Health care access was difficult for rural and village communities. During the pandemic, the country relied extensively on help from abroad, including the deployment of medical personnel, coronavirus testing kits, personal protective equipment, and from 2021, vaccines. As of April 2021, the country was unable to conduct mass testing, leading health officials to believe that the reported infection numbers were likely vastly underestimating the scale of the outbreak. During the wave of cases in the first half of 2021, the demographics of the country – dominated by the very young, who were less likely to require intensive care when infected with the coronavirus – were regarded as having prevented a worse situation.

== Timeline ==
Cases

Deaths

=== 2020 ===
On 20 March 2020, the first case in Papua New Guinea was confirmed. The case was a 45-year-old man who had recently traveled to Spain. On 5 April, Elizabeth II, Queen of Papua New Guinea addressed the Commonwealth in a televised broadcast, in which she asked people to "take comfort that while we may have more still to endure, better days will return". She added, "we will be with our friends again; we will be with our families again; we will meet again".

On 7 April, a second case of COVID-19 was confirmed. The patient from East New Britain Province had developed a cough on 23 March, and had been placed in quarantine. The entire province was placed under lockdown for the next 21 days. On 16 April, five new COVID-19 cases were confirmed. On 23 April, a woman from Eastern Highlands Province who had sought medical help with symptoms two weeks earlier was confirmed to be infected, marking the eighth case in Papua New Guinea.

On 4 May, acting Health Secretary Dr Paison Dakulala reported that all known cases had recovered, but stressed that they didn't know what they were fighting. A total of 2,400 tests had been carried out, with the bulk in the capital Port Moresby.

On 20 June, the ninth case was confirmed, and On 25 June, the tenth case, a 27-year old member of the PNG Defence Force, was confirmed which gave evidence of local transmission. On 16 July, four new cases, that of the staff from the main laboratory which tested for the virus were confirmed. On 26 July, PNG recorded its highest number of positive COVID-19 cases in a day with 23 new cases. The next day, on 27 July, the first death from COVID-19 in the country was confirmed. On 2 August, the total number of cases in the country surpassed 100. On 7 August, the first case of COVID-19 was confirmed in the Autonomous Region of Bougainville.

On 10 August, Prime Minister James Marape announced that the two-week lockdown of Port Moresby, which expired the following day, would not be extended in spite of rising case numbers, saying that as per advice from specialist teams, a strategy of "living with the virus" was preferable to "drastic measures". Governor of Port Moresby, Powes Parkop supported the decision, pointing to the present situation of economic crisis and the increased risks due to the lockdown in particular for students, who were often living in crowded conditions inferior to those in schools.

By early September, 12 of the country's 22 provinces had reported positive cases. According to a 14 December situation report issued jointly by the PNG National Department of Health and the WHO, 44 new cases were reported across the country in the period from 7 to 13 December. Of these cases, 35 were from West New Britain, where two recent clusters of cases had developed in the preceding three weeks. The report warned that testing rates in all provinces had remained "critically low", and that there were "large significant delays in receiving test results". It also warned that a rise in cases over the upcoming holiday period was to be expected. By the end of 2020, there were a total of 760 cases with 8 deaths.

=== 2021 ===
Due to rising case numbers, and the isolation wards at Port Moresby Hospital and the nearby Gerehu Hospital both being full, a temporary COVID-19 field hospital at a local sporting facility in the city was reopened. According to a ministerial briefing obtained by the ABC, "critical functions" at the National Control Centre for COVID-19 were endangered by about 40 staff members not having been paid for five months.

Amid a worsening of the outbreak with over 1,400 active cases, Australian Prime Minister Scott Morrison announced on 17 March that Australia would send 8,000 vaccine doses to PNG the following week, and that it would request a further one million doses from AstraZeneca and European authorities to be diverted to the country. Refugee advocates called on the Australian government to return the refugees and asylum seekers who had remained in PNG after the closure of the Manus Island facility in 2019; six of them had tested positive in the preceding two weeks. On 23 March tougher anti-pandemic measures took effect, with internal border controls being tightened, personal movement restricted, and mask-wearing made mandatory.

On 30 March, Prime Minister James Marape, health workers, senior politicians and elected officials were among the first to be vaccinated with the AstraZeneca vaccine. Marape said on the occasion that he had decided to be among the first to be vaccinated to demonstrate that the vaccine was safe.

On 21 April, the total number of confirmed cases in the country passed 10,000. Pandemic response controller David Manning spoke of a "critical stage" in combating the outbreak and urged citizens to comply with pandemic control measures.

A national rollout of the AstraZeneca vaccine was officially opened by Prime Minister Marape on 4 May. More than 130,000 doses from the COVAX program were distributed across the country, targeting 3 per cent of the population identified as frontline workers. The take-up for 8,000 doses that had previously been delivered by Australia had been sluggish, with less than half of the doses administered in Port Moresby. Misinformation from social media, resulting in mistrust of the vaccine, was identified by the Lowy Institute as one of the key reasons for the vaccine hesitancy. On 23 June, PNG received 200,000 doses of the Sinopharm BIBP vaccine from China. The PNG government said that the vaccine would initially be provided to Chinese citizens in the country. In early July, PNG opened its vaccination program to all persons over 18 years. This occurred as the country faced considerable vaccine hesitancy, with only just under 55,000 having received a vaccination, and among fears that 70,000 donated doses would have to be discarded. A monitoring by Caritas of COVID-19 awareness programs in the country found that rural communities, largely relying on word of mouth rather than the media, were vulnerable to misinformation regarding the virus. Due to concerns over the Delta variant, the government closed its international borders to all except the vaccinated.

In a 2 July article, the China state media outlet Global Times alleged that "Australian consultants" in PNG had been "obstructing" the emergency use authorisation of Chinese vaccines. A 5 July statement by foreign ministry spokesman Wang Wenbin expressed concern over what he called "irresponsible behaviour" by Australia in the country. On 6 July during a trip to PNG and on 9 July, the Australian Minister for International Development and the Pacific, Zed Seselja rejected the accusations.

By 2 September, the number of Delta variant cases reported from Western Province increased to 22. Citing phylogenic studies which suggested that the origin of the outbreak was in neighbouring Indonesian Papua province, National Pandemic Response Deputy Controller, Daoni Esorom urged people to stop traveling illegally there. A medical team arrived in the Port Moresby, joined by a British team soon after, to deal with a strong surge of infections caused by the Delta variant in the country. The International Federation of Red Cross and Red Crescent Societies said that "concerted international action" was needed to support the country.

In early November, local media reported that the health system of the country was unable to cope with the wave of infections. In response, a New Zealand medical and logistics support team with essential supplies was sent to the country, with most of them arriving on 13 November, to stay for prospectively one month. Experts warned that, due to the extremely low vaccination rate – less than five per cent in the adult population – the country could become a breeding ground for a further mutation of the coronavirus. By the end of 2021, the total number of cases had reached 36,158 with 590 deaths.

=== 2022 ===
Prime Minister James Marape tested positive during a trip to China early in February 2022, and cut his visit short as a result. On 9 February, he released a statement saying that he was "doing well", and that "vaccination has really helped." He urged fellow PNG citizens to get vaccinated.

On 16 February, the country reopened to vaccinated travellers, while some domestic restrictions remained. The countrywide vaccination rate was about four per cent as of that date. The number of cases continued to rise in 2023 but not as drastically as in the previous year. By the end of 2022, the total number of cases reached 46,711 with 669 deaths.

== Prevention measures ==
The Government of Papua New Guinea banned all travellers from Asian countries and closed its border with Indonesia, taking effect from 30 January 2020. On 16 April, due to additional confirmed cases in the National Capital District (NCD) and the Western Province, the Emergency Controller issued National Emergency Order No. 16, effectively locking down the NCD. The order established an 8 pm to 6 am curfew, prohibited most public gatherings, limited groups to four people, banned public transportation, and suspended alcohol and Betel nut sales. The order also prohibits domestic air travel and closes public venues such as gambling halls, night clubs, sports and sports clubs, and religious services.

On 3 May 2020, the curfew for the National Capital District and Central Province was lifted, alcohol restrictions have been lifted. Gatherings remain banned, social distancing measures have to be enforced, and washing hands before entering church services is mandatory.

On 5 May, the schools reopened; however, some schools required face masks and others have sent their students back again.

The Autonomous Region of Bougainville region has imposed flight restrictions on mainland PNG, whereby flights could only be approved charters or medevac trips until 13 August.

== Statistics ==
=== Confirmed new cases per day ===
View source data.

=== Confirmed deaths per day ===
View source data.

=== Cases by province ===
Province	Cases	Deaths	Population (2011)	Cases/100K
National Capital District	11,554	102	364,125	3,173.09
Western Province	3,737	33	201,351	1,855.96
Central Province	1,195	2	269,756	442.99
Morobe Province	2,574	50	67,481	3,814.41
East Sepik	746	8	45,053	1,655.83
East New Britain Province	2,291	31	328,369	697.69
West New Britain Province	1,241	6	264,264	469.61
Autonomous Region of Bougainville	981	17	249,358	393.41
Eastern Highlands Province	2,457	118	579,825	423.75
Milne Bay	1,499	5	276,512	542.11
New Ireland Province	918	13	194,067	473.03
West Sepik	879	13	248,411	353.85
Southern Highlands Province	1,177	53	510,245	230.67
Western Highlands Province	3,050	79	36,258	8,411.94
Enga	1,139	7	432,045	263.63
Hela	1,004	14	249,449	402.48
Chimbu Province	1,062	11	376,473	282.1
Jiwaka Province	511	30	343,987	148.55
Manus Province	895	11	60,485	1,479.71
Madang Province	1,379	29	493,906	279.20
Gulf Province	632	0	158,197	399.50
Oro Province	618	6	186,309	331.71
22/22	41,539	638	7,275,324	570.96
Updated 25 March 2022

== See also ==
- COVID-19 pandemic in the Autonomous Region of Bougainville
