= Joseph Kangki Nabuai =

Joseph Kangaki Nabuai

Bougainville House of Representatives
- In office 2015–Present
- Preceded by: Paul Mitu
- Constituency: Lule

Joseph Kangaki Nabuai is a Papua New Guinean politician from the Autonomous Region of Bougainville. He is a member of the Bougainville House of Representatives.

== Biography ==
Nabuai was elected as a member of the Bougainville House of Representatives from Lule in 2013 and re-elected in 2015. He is the first priest to be elected to the Bougainville House of Representatives.
