= Raopos Apou Tepaia =

Papua New Guinean politician (died 2016)

Raopos Apou Tepaia (died 2016) was a Papua New Guinean politician.

Tepaia represented Taonita Teop in the Bougainville House of Representatives until his death in 2016. The seat remained vacant until funds were acquired for an October 2018 by-election, won by Albert Toro, who also died in office.
