= Raymond Masono =

Papua New Guinean politician (died 2021)

Vice-President of the Autonomous Region of Bougainville
- In office 22 February 2017 – 25 September 2020
- President: John Momis
- Preceded by: Patrick Nisira
- Succeeded by: Patrick Nisira

Minister of Health
- In office 2 October 2020 – 25 June 2021
- President: Ishmael Toroama
- Succeeded by: Charry Napto

Minister for Mineral and Energy Resources of Autonomous Bougainville Government
- In office 2015–2020
- President: John Momis
- Succeeded by: Rodney Osioko

Member of the Bougainville House of Representatives
- In office 2015–2021
- Preceded by: Frank Pasini Marena
- Constituency: Atolls

Personal details
- Died: 25 June 2021 Buka, Papua New Guinea
- Children: Amanda Masono Getsi

Raymond Masono (died on 25 June 2021) was a politician from Autonomous Region of Bougainville. He was the Vice-President of the Autonomous Region of Bougainville from 2017 to 2020.

== Biography ==
Masono was elected as a member of the Bougainville House of Representatives from Atolls in 2015. Later, he was appointed as Minister for Mineral and Energy Resources.

Masono was elected as Vice-President of the Autonomous Region of Bougainville in 2017.

On 2 October 2020 Masono was appointed Minister of Health in the cabinet of Ishmael Toroama.

Masono died on 25 June 2021 at a hospital in Buka.
