= 2020 Bougainvillean general election =

Election in Bougainville

2020 Bougainvillean presidential election
- August 1 – September 1, 2020
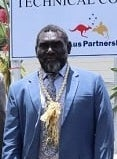
Candidate	Ishmael Toroama	Simon Dumarinu
Party	BPAP	Independent
Instant-runoff final vote	51,317	33,088
Percentage	60.79%	39.21%
First-preference vote	27,448	20,691
President before election
John Momis
NBP
Elected President
Ishmael Toroama
BPAP

A presidential and parliamentary election was held in the Autonomous Region of Bougainville between 12 August and 1 September 2020. 440 candidates were contesting the 40 seats in the Bougainville House of Representatives, including 25 competing to be President of the Autonomous Region of Bougainville. The new government will negotiate the outcome of the 2019 Bougainvillean independence referendum, which saw 98.3% of voters supporting independence from Papua New Guinea.

Originally scheduled to be held in May, the elections were delayed twice due to the COVID-19 pandemic, first until June, and then again until August.

On 21 August 2020 the Electoral Commissioner announced that polling had almost been completed, one week ahead of schedule. On 24 August a police officer was suspended for allegedly interfering with the election. Several other officers are under investigation.

== Presidential election ==
Elections are held under the instant-runoff voting system, with voters classifying exactly three candidates. 25 candidates are contesting the presidency, including former President James Tanis, former soldier Thomas Raivet, MP Fidelis Semoso, lawyer Paul Nerau, businessman Peter Tsiamalili, health care professional Ruby Mirinka, and former MP Magdalene Toroansi.

Incumbent President John Momis attempted to change the constitution to allow him to stand for a third term. Following Parliament voting down the amendment he unsuccessfully challenged the decision in the Papua New Guinea Supreme Court.

== Results ==
Vote counting began on 4 September 2020. Partial results at the beginning of the elimination process on 18 September had former Bougainville Revolutionary Army commander Ishmael Toroama leading, with former PNG MP Father Simon Dumarinu in second place, followed by Thomas Raivet and Fidelis Semoso.

On 14 September the counting period was extended until 24 September due to the number of votes and candidates.

On 23 September Ishmael Toroama was declared the winner after the 23rd elimination, with 51,317 votes. Father Simon Dumarinu came second with 33,088. Toroama's caretaker government was formally sworn in on 25 September. His Cabinet was announced on 2 October 2020.

=== President ===
Candidate	First pref.	Elimination																						
Candidate	First pref.	1	2	3	4	5	6	7	8	9	10	11	12	13	14	15	16	17	18	19	20	21	22	23
Ishmael Toroama	27,448	27,491	27,560	27,652	27,742	28,007	28,337	28,746	29,105	29,535	30,575	31,001	31,611	32,074	33,007	33,642	34,266	35,400	39,081	41,668	43,629	47,145	49,696	51,317
Simon Dumarinu	20,691	20,726	20,761	20,816	20,847	20,979	21,276	21,551	20,381	20,882	21,173	21,431	21,711	22,023	22,474	22,843	23,163	24,341	25,863	28,120	28,972	29,896	32,296	33,088
Thomas Raivet	12,984	13,011	13,041	13,056	13,102	13,153	13,259	13,356	13,433	13,576	13,629	14,032	14,182	14,547	14,779	15,410	16,026	16,120	16,326	17,106	18,016	20,107		
Fidelis Semoso	12,286	12,319	12,347	12,385	12,419	12,449	12,602	12,700	12,946	13,071	13,141	13,383	13,509	13,873	14,038	14,167	14,832	14,978	15,507	16,069	17,443			
Peter E. Tsiamalili	11,806	11,830	11,854	11,884	11,925	11,994	12,149	12,306	12,388	12,567	12,726	13,067	13,467	13,962	14,324	14,944	15,762	16,123	16,637	17,302	18,444	20,953	23,563	
Samuel Kauona	7,965	7,985	7,989	8,002	8,015	8,049	8,183	8,318	8,399	8,499	8,594	8,719	8,827	8,926	9,240	9,370	9,516	9,777						
James Tanis	7,633	7,640	7,654	7,664	7,688	7,737	7,924	8,024	8,071	8,209	8,345	8,495	8,680	8,839	9,096	9,359	9,547	10,174	10,507					
Joe Lera	6,715	6,730	6,745	6,791	6,806	6,964	7,104	7,276	7,464	7,564	7,882	8,126	8,712	9,036	9,325	9,875	10,259	10,595	11,055	11,924				
Wesma N. Piika	4,218	4,224	4,233	4,239	4,252	4,330	4,375	4,467	4,496	4,559	4,660	4,719	4,985	5,057	5,159	5,281	5,354							
Paul Nerau	3,796	3,798	3,823	3,836	3,846	3,881	3,912	3,942	3,962	4,153	4,253	4,315	4,443	4,539	4,800									
Sione Paasia	3,395	3,423	3,455	3,444	3,466	3,483	3,584	3,645	3,749	3,801	3,837	4,455	4,605	4,817	4,973	5,161								
Andrew K. Miriki	3,092	3,107	3,130	3,413	3,178	3,202	3,258	3,450	3,487	3,652	3,990	4,093	4,261	4,419										
Kapeatu Puaria	3,045	3,054	3,093	3,105	3,160	3,187	3,230	3,281	3,367	3,458	3,486													
Samuel S. Maiha	2,926	2,936	2,978	2,988	3,029	3,190	3,235	3,354	3,402	3,540	3,717	3,789												
Rueben Siara	2,755	2,764	2,767	2,789	2,792	2,907	3,024	3,075	3,123	3,148														
Patrick Koles	2,665	2,669	2,713	2,719	2,771	2,791	2,852	2,902	3,351	3,617	3,649	3,835	3,907											
Robert C. Tulsa	2,560	2,565	2,584	2,597	2,622	2,649	2,690	2,740	2,897															
Micheal Poposan	2,248	2,258	2,271	2,272	2,277	2,301	2,342	2,354																
Martin R. Miriori	2,096	2,106	2,109	2,141	2,150	2,167																		
Ruby Mirinka	1,980	1,988	2,012	2,105	2,133	2,192	2,266																	
Nick F. Penial	1,352	1,363	1,370	1,381	1,391																			
John B. Bule	573	573	593	600																				
Magdalene I. Toroansi	532	544	548																					
Benjamin Muruna	502	506																						
Bernard S. Tzilu	342																							
