= Bougainville Labour Party =

Political party in Bougainville, Papua New Guinea

The Bougainville Labour Party (BLP) is a political party in the Autonomous Region of Bougainville, Papua New Guinea.

It was established ahead of the inaugural 2005 election by lawyer Thomas Tamusio and philosopher Albert Toro. The party endorsed Bougainville People's Congress candidate Joseph Kabui for the presidency, with party president Peter Nerau opting to contest the Baubake constituency in the Bougainville House of Representatives. It was reported in July 2014 that New Bougainville Party MP John Ken would relaunch and lead the party into the 2015 election, but this did not occur. Nick F. Peniai was the party's unsuccessful candidate for the Bougainville presidency at the 2015 election.
