= Francesca Semoso =

Bougainville (Papua New Guinea) politician

- Semoso in 2016

Member of the National Parliament of Papua New Guinea
- Incumbent
- Assumed office October 30, 2023
- Preceded by: William Nakin
- Constituency: North Bougainville Open

Personal details
- Party: Pangu Pati
- Education: University of Papua New Guinea

Francesca Rhianna Semoso is a Bougainvillean broadcaster and politician who has been a member of the National Parliament of Papua New Guinea from North Bougainville District as a member of Pangu Pati since 2023. She was a member of the Bougainville House of Representatives from 2005 to 2010, and 2015 to 2020.

== Early life and education ==
Francesca Rhianna Semoso was born to Carmela Gegei Semoso. Francesca's sister Fidelis Semoso was elected to the Bougainville House of Representatives. Francesca Rhianna Semoso was educated at Malasang Primary, Passam National High School, and the University of Papua New Guinea.

== Career ==
Semoso worked for the National Broadcasting Corporation of Papua New Guinea for ten years and then the UMI FM radio station.

In the 2005 election Semoso was elected to the Bougainville House of Representatives from the North Bougainville District seat reserved for women. She returned to the after winning in the 2015 election.

William Nakin, a member of the National Parliament of Papua New Guinea, died in office and Semoso was elected in a 2023 by-election to fill his seat. She was Bougainville and Pangu Pati's first female member of parliament. On 3 December 2024, she was appointed as assistant speaker, the first woman to hold that role. On 13 March 2025, she became the first woman to preside over a session of parliament. During her tenure she served as a member of the Communication, Privileges and Bi-partisan committee.

== Political positions ==
Semoso supports the Autonomous Region of Bougainville gaining independence from Papua New Guinea.

== Works cited ==
=== News ===
- "Are women truly empowered in PNG?". The National. 25 March 2025. Archived from the original on 28 June 2025.
- "Francesca Semoso: Bougainville's first woman MP in PNG's parliament". Radio New Zealand. 30 October 2023. Archived from the original on 28 June 2025.
- "Preferences get Bougainville's Semoso back". Radio New Zealand. 9 June 2015. Archived from the original on 28 June 2025.
- "Semoso first woman appointed as Assistant Speaker of PNG's Parliament". Australian Broadcasting Corporation. 20 March 2025. Archived from the original on 28 June 2025.
- "Semoso, Naguri are assistant speakers". The National. 4 December 2024. Archived from the original on 28 June 2025.
- "Semoso welcomed into ranks". The National. 6 November 2023. Archived from the original on 28 June 2025.
- Hiriats, Nicollette (30 October 2024). "MP Semoso lays late mother to rest". Papua New Guinea Post-Courier. Archived from the original on 28 June 2025.

=== Web ===
- "Hon. Francesca Rianna Semoso". National Parliament of Papua New Guinea. Archived from the original on 28 June 2025.
- "Hon Francesca Rhianna Semoso, Deputy Speaker of the Bougainville House of Representatives, PNG". Pacific Women in Business. Archived from the original on 19 April 2020.
