= Kieta =

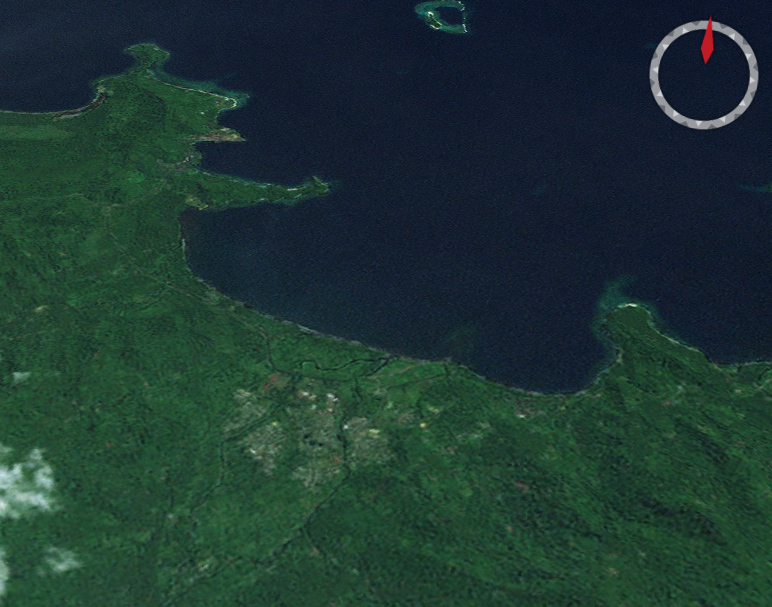
- The city of Arawa, and the port of Kieta, from space

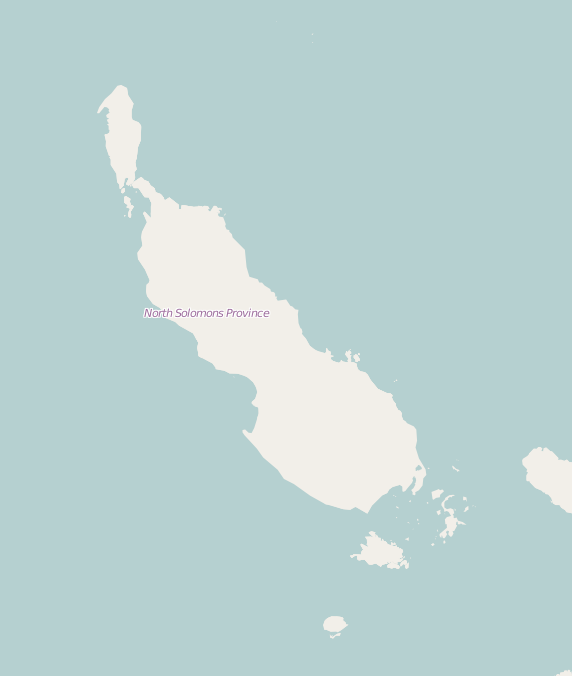
- Location within Bougainville Island
- Coordinates: 6°13′S 155°38′E
- Country: Papua New Guinea
- Province: Bougainville
- District: Central Bougainville
- LLG: Arawa Rural LLG
- Time zone: UTC+10 (AEST)
- Location: 12 km (7.5 mi) from Arawa
- Mean max temp: 32 °C (90 °F)
- Mean min temp: 23 °C (73 °F)
- Annual rainfall: 3,037 mm (119.6 in)

Kieta is a port town located on the eastern coast of the island of Bougainville in Papua New Guinea, near the township of Arawa. After extensive destruction during the Bougainville conflict, Kieta has few inhabitants now, and is known mainly for its transport connections (wharf and airfield).

== History ==
On 17 May 1885, agreements were made between Germany and the United Kingdom over the islands of Bougainville and Buka in the area of the German sphere of interest. On 20 September 1905 a station was built with a post office and customs. During this time, German administration of the island extended little beyond the region around Kieta.

In 1902, the Society of Mary became established in Kieta, following expansion throughout the Solomon Islands.

Following World War I, the region came under Australian administration as part of Territory of Papua. However, ownership of the island was still limited, as most of it remained under indigenous control.

Under the Australian administration, Kieta was developed into an administrative hub, with six Australian officials supported by a group of indigenous police officers.

In the 1920s and 1930s, gold, silver, and copper were discovered in the mountains near Kieta. However, early attempts at mining were not fruitful. By the end of World War II, only 1789 ounces of gold and 80 ounces of silver had been extracted.

Kieta was occupied by the Japanese during the Second World War. During this time, German Marist priests propagandized for the Japanese occupation. Some indigenous people aided the Japanese occupation force, such as the Black Dogs, who conducted raids against inland villages, as well as hunted down fugitives.

In 1960s, the Australian Bureau of Mine Resources, Geology and Geophysics re-surveyed the area. While there was little new discovered at the time, new technologies developed since the first surveys made it more feasible to establish a mine in the region. In the latter half of the 1960s, multiple mining offices were established in Kieta.

The majority of the town was destroyed in the 1990 Bougainville conflict. The airfield has a 5,400 feet (1,600 m) runway which was used by the Japanese in World War II, and was recently serviced by Air Niugini until 1990. Since then, the only aircraft to service the area have been the Royal Australian Air Force and Royal New Zealand Air Forces (C130 Hercules) in support of the Peace Monitoring Group.

A number of Papuan languages are spoken in the Kieta district, such as Naasioi.

== Climate ==
Kieta has a mean maximum temperature of 32 °C (90 °F), mean minimum temperature of 23 °C (73 °F), and annual rainfall of 3,037 mm (119.6 in).
