= Arawa Rural LLG =

Local-level government in Papua New Guinea

- Country: Papua New Guinea
- Province: Autonomous Region of Bougainville

Population (2011 census)
  - Total: 44,865
- Time zone: UTC+10 (AEST)

Arawa Rural LLG is a local-level government (LLG) of the Autonomous Region of Bougainville, Papua New Guinea.

== Wards ==
- 01. Kokoda
- 02. Torau
- 03. Kongara No. 1
- 04. Kongara No. 2 (Amiaming)
- 05. Eivo 1
- 06. Avaipa
- 07. Oune
- 08. Bava Pirung
- 09. North Nasioi
- 10. Apiatei
- 11. South Nasioi
- 12. Ioro 1
- 13. Ioro 2/Domana
- 14. Pinei-Nari
- 15. Ioro 3
- 82. Arawa Urban
