= Bougainville People's Alliance Party =

Political party in the Autonomous Region of Bougainville

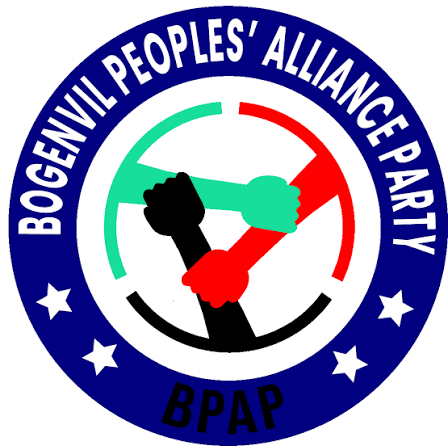
- Leader: Ishmael Toroama
- Founded: May 2019
- Ideology: Populism; Bougainville Independence

The Bougainville People's Alliance Party (BPAP) is a Bougainvillean political party founded by Ishmael Toroama in 2019. In the 2020 Bougainville Presidential Election, Toroama, the BPAP candidate won the election.
