= Bougainville Independence Movement =

Political party in Papua New Guinea

Bougainville Independence Movement (BIM) was a political party in the Autonomous Region of Bougainville, of eastern Papua New Guinea.

The party's creation was announced on 6 April 2005 by James Tanis, who invited rebel leader Francis Ona to lead the group. Tanis had been the Bougainville Peace Minister and vice-president of the Bougainville People's Congress. Tanis stated he wanted the party to represent the "independence aspirations of the Bougainville people". He finished third in the presidential election, behind Joseph Kabui and John Momis.

Tanis won the 2008 presidential by-election following Kabui's death, serving under the BIM banner. He was defeated at the 2010 election. Tanis subsequently worked for the government as a senior public servant, and the party did not contest the 2015 election.

In the 2019 Bougainvillean independence referendum, 98% of the voters supported independence.
