= Wakunai Rural LLG =

Local-level government in Papua New Guinea

- Country: Papua New Guinea
- Province: Autonomous Region of Bougainville

Population (2011 census)
  - Total: 13,795
- Time zone: UTC+10 (AEST)

Wakunai Rural LLG is a local-level government (LLG) of the Autonomous Region of Bougainville, Papua New Guinea.

== Wards ==
- 02. Ewara / Papana
- 03. Auta
- 04. Rotokas
- 05. Rikua
- 06. Toisiko
- 07. Assigoro
- 08. Usireio
- 09. Lower Aeta/Rau Coe
- 10. Bohi
- 87. Wakunai Urban
