= Ishmael Toroama =

President of Bougainville since 2020

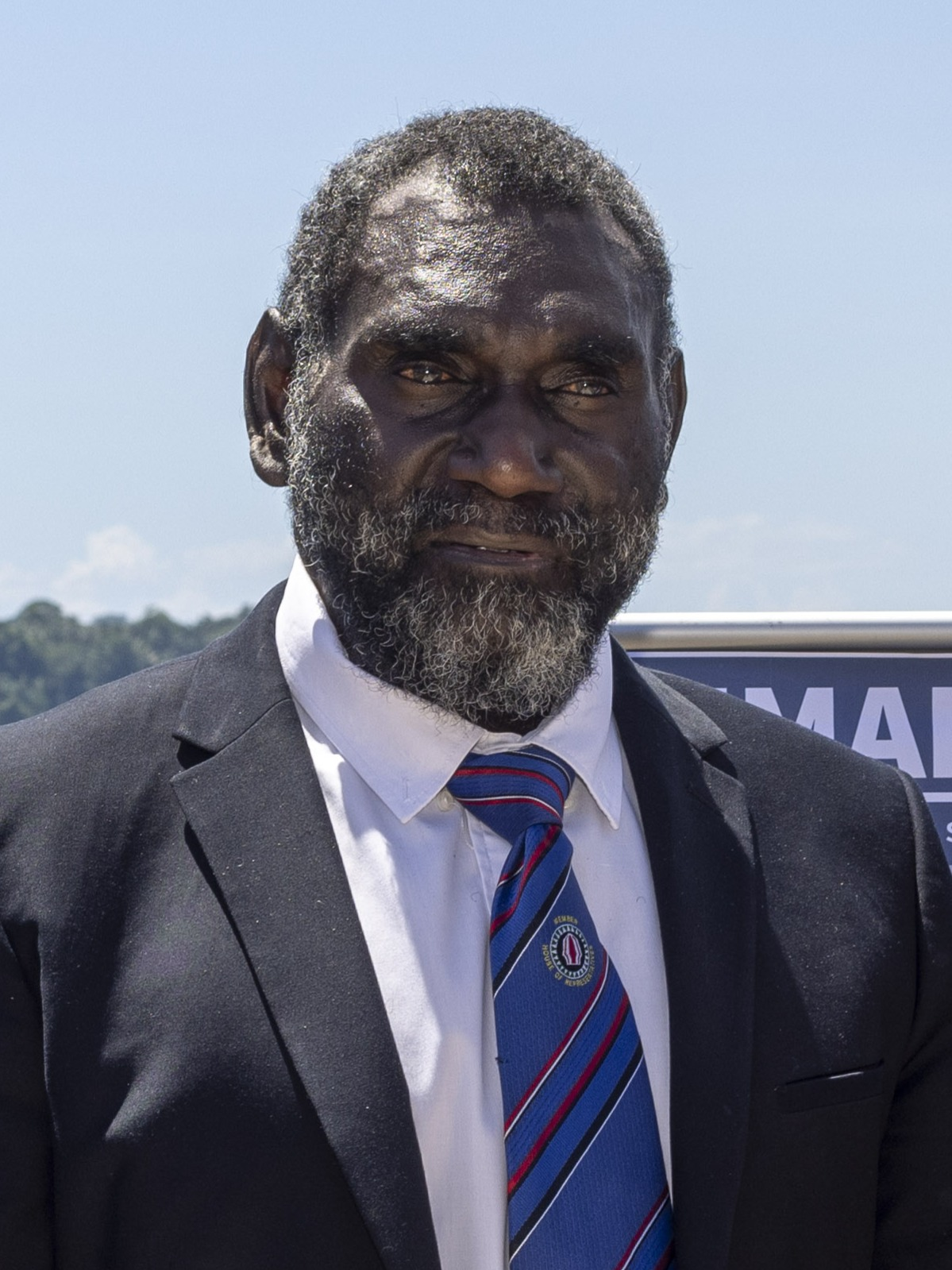
- Toroama in 2024

4th President of Bougainville
- Incumbent
- Assumed office 25 September 2020
- Vice President: Patrick Nisira; Ezekiel Massat
- Preceded by: John Momis

Personal details
- Born: 28 February 1969 (age 57) Roreinang, Bougainville, Territory of New Guinea (now Bougainville)
- Party: Bougainville People’s Alliance Party
- Spouse: Betty Toroama
- Children: 3

Military service
- Allegiance: Formerly: Bougainville Revolutionary Army (1988–2001)
- Years of service: 1988–2001
- Battles/wars: Bougainville conflict

Ishmael Toroama (born 28 February 1969) is a Bougainvillean politician who was elected President of the Autonomous Region of Bougainville in 2020. He is a former commander in the Bougainville Revolutionary Army.

== Early life ==
Toroama was born in Roreinang in the Kieta District in Central Bougainville on 28 February 1969 and educated at the local school and at Hutjena High School. After dropping out of school, he worked for the Tonolei Development Corporation.

== Civil war and aftermath ==
Toroama joined the Bougainville Revolutionary Army in the early days of the Bougainville Civil War and quickly became one of its field commanders. In 1997 he was injured by a rocket-propelled grenade. In 1999 he became the BRA's chief of defence, succeeding Sam Kauona. As chief of defence, he was one of the signatories of the Bougainville Peace Agreement and opposed the breakaway faction under Francis Ona. Following the conflict, he enriched himself by becoming a broker in the reconciliation process, then providing "protection" to local businesses. He later became a cocoa farmer.

== Political career ==
Toroama repeatedly ran unsuccessfully for office following the signing of the Bougainville Peace Agreement and the establishment of the Autonomous Bougainville Government. In the 2010 Bougainvillean general election he ran unsuccessfully for the seat of South Nasioi, and in the 2012 Papua New Guinean general election he failed to win the seat of Central Bougainville. In the 2015 Bougainvillean general election he ran for President, coming second to John Momis.

In December 2019 he announced his intention to stand for president in the 2020 Bougainvillean general election. He subsequently launched the Bougainville People’s Alliance Party to contest the Bougainville House of Representatives. He performed well in the election, leading the count at the 21st elimination, and ultimately winning the presidency. He was formally sworn in as president on 25 September 2020. He appointed his Cabinet on 2 October 2020. He was reelected president in the 2025 Bougainvillean general election.

== Personal life ==
Ishmael Toroama is married to Betty Toroama, with whom he has three children: Doreen, Esau, and Victor.
