= Central Bougainville District =

- Location within Papua New Guinea
- Coordinates: 6°14′S 155°34′E
- Country: Papua New Guinea
- Regions: Bougainville
- Capital: Arawa-Kieta

Area
  - Total: 2,592 km^{2} (1,001 sq mi)

Population (2011 census)
  - Total: 58,860
  - Density: 22.71/km^{2} (58.81/sq mi)
- Time zone: UTC+11:00 (BST)

Central Bougainville District is a district of the Autonomous Region of Bougainville of Papua New Guinea. Its capital is Arawa-Kieta.

== Local-level governments ==
- Arawa Rural
- Wakunai Rural
