= Arawa, Bougainville =

Town of Bougainville

Arawa
- Town
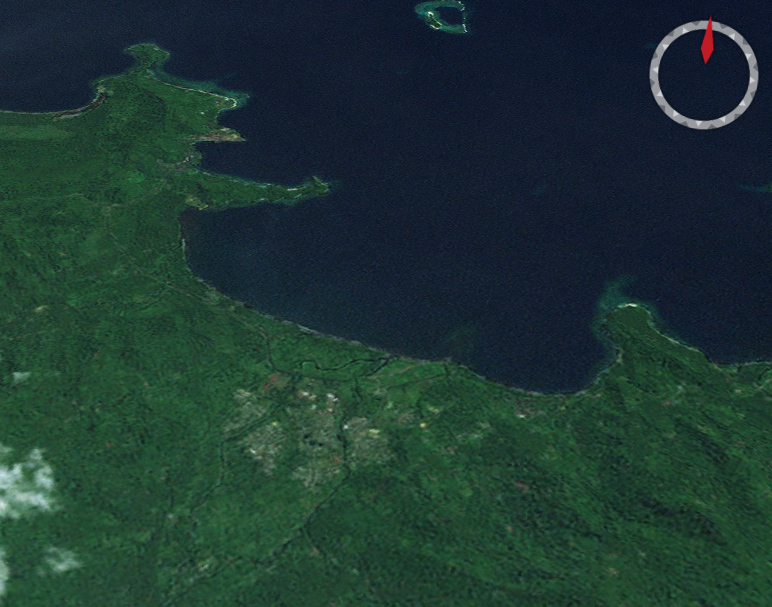
- The city of Arawa, and the port of Kieta, from space

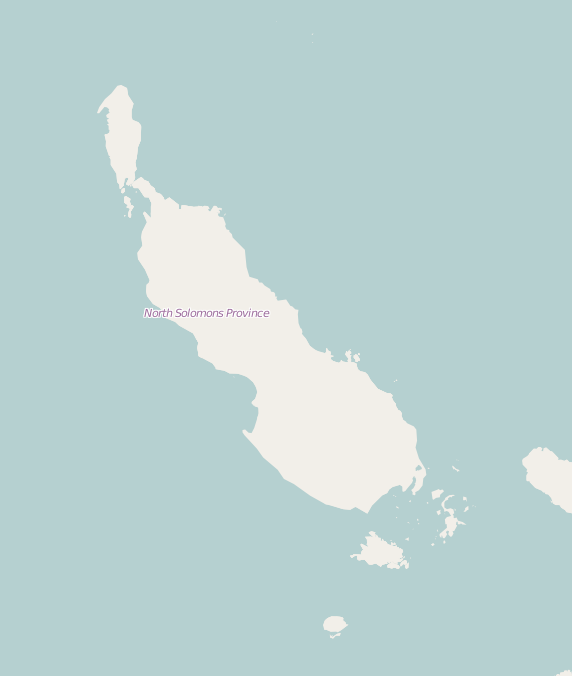
- Location within Bougainville Island
- Coordinates: 6°13′30″S 155°34′00″E
- Country: Papua New Guinea
- Autonomous Region: Bougainville
- District: Central Bougainville
- LLG: Arawa Rural LLG
- Established: 1884

Population (2000)
  - Total: 36,443
  - Rank: 4th

Languages
  - Main languages: English and Tok Pisin
  - Traditional language: Naasioi
- Time zone: UTC+11:00 (BST)
- Location: 22 km (14 mi) from Panguna
- Mean max temp: 32 °C (90 °F)
- Mean min temp: 23 °C (73 °F)
- Annual rainfall: 3,037 mm (119.6 in)
- Climate: Af

Arawa is the largest town and the former capital of the Autonomous Region of Bougainville in Papua New Guinea. It began as the village of Uruava. It is administered under Arawa Rural LLG.

The town was largely destroyed during the Bougainville Civil War, resulting in the relocation of the capital to Buka, though there are plans to rebuild Arawa and make it the capital again. The land where Arawa is now situated was previously a large expatriate plantation.

== History ==
Bougainville Island has been inhabited for at least 28,000 years.

In 1884, the German Empire established German New Guinea. In 1899, the territory was expanded to include Bougainville Island. However, it was not until 1905 that an official government station was established. During this time, German administration was based in the nearby Kieta.

In 1902, the Society of Mary became established in Kieta, following expansion throughout the Solomon Islands. As of 1906, Arawa was notable for being a place where mountain-dwelling villagers would go to fish. It was also a common site for German ships to dock, which made it a local landmark.

Following World War I, the region came under Australian administration as part of Territory of Papua. In the 1920s and 1930s, gold, silver, and copper were discovered in the mountains near Kieta. However, early attempts at mining were not fruitful. By the end of World War II, only 1789 ounces of gold and 80 ounces of silver had been extracted. In 1960s, the Australian Bureau of Mine Resources, Geology and Geophysics re-surveyed the area. While there was little new discovered at the time, new technologies developed since the first surveys made it more feasible to establish a mine in the region.

During World War II, Arawa was occupied by the Empire of Japan. It was bombed by the Allies twice. Following Japanese surrender in September 1945, administrative control was returned to Australia.

As a result of the develop that occurred during the establishment of mining on Bougainville Island, in the mid-60s, the small village of Uruava was transformed into the hub city of Arawa.

Arawa was purpose-built to house Australian miners and their families. It was quickly developed through the 1970s and 1980s with residential neighbourhoods, commercial enterprises, large public schools in addition to long-established Roman Catholic schools in Kieta, a public library, hotels and restaurants and entertainment facilities such as a film theatre.

When Bougainville Copper needed a civic headquarters for dealing with the local and national government instrumentalities, Arawa Plantation was an obvious candidate. It was in close proximity to Kieta, the historic district headquarters whose geographical location made expansion difficult. It was also close to new commercial port facilities at Loloho in Anewa Bay north of Arawa, in addition to the small longstanding port near Kieta, which allowed rural agricultural products to be loaded onto cargo ships. The extremely busy Aropa Airport was south of Kieta, immediately adjacent to the sea.

Villagers throughout Bougainville Island and Buka Island had long been accustomed to seeing films at church stations, while residents from elsewhere greatly desired them; videos were common and frequently shown by Lutheran, Anglican and Baptist churches in the area in an attempt to attract converts. These denominations did not previously operate on Bougainville and Buka, which prior to the Panguna mine had largely been Roman Catholic and Methodist United Church in Papua New Guinea and the Solomon Islands.

Beginning in 1988, the Bougainville conflict was waged between the government of Papua New Guinea and the Bougainville Revolutionary Army. Arawa was one of the regions where violence was centralized. A peace agreement was signed in 2001. In 2003, a memorial for those who died during the war was unveiled.

Children in Arawa, June 2015

== See also ==
- Arawa Rural LLG
- Populated places in the Autonomous Region of Bougainville
