= Bougainville House of Representatives =

Legislature of the Autonomous Region of Bougainville

Type
- Type: Unicameral

History
- Founded: 2005

Leadership
- Speaker: Simon Pentanu since 15 June 2015
- Seats: 41 (39 elected and 2 ex officio)

Elections
- First election: 20 May to 9 June 2005
- Last election: 5 September 2025

Meeting place
- Buka, Bougainville

Website
- Official website

The Bougainville House of Representatives is the legislature of the Autonomous Region of Bougainville, an autonomous entity within Papua New Guinea. It was established in 2005 under Part 5 of the region's constitution, which specifies that the House of Representatives shall comprise 39 elected members in addition to the President of the Autonomous Region of Bougainville, and the Speaker of the House, chosen outside of it.

== Structure ==
All elected members are chosen via Instant-runoff voting. Each of the 33 constituencies defined under Part 8 of the Constitution elects a single member to the House. Additionally, the North Bougainville District, South Bougainville District and Central Bougainville District each elect a woman representative and a former combatant representative who fought with the Bougainville Revolutionary Army during Bougainville's armed struggle for independence from Papua New Guinea. Finally, the Vice President of Bougainville, and the Speaker, appointed externally by the elected members, are ex officio members.

Representatives of Bougainville who have been elected to the National Parliament of Papua New Guinea are allowed many of the same privileges as members of the Bougainville House of Representatives; but they may not: introduce motions, vote, or be counted towards a quorum. However, they are allowed to attend meetings of the House where they take part in debates and other proceedings.

== Speakers ==
The Speaker is not an elected member of the House of Representatives, and is elected by a vote by the members.

Speaker	Term	Notes
Nick Peniai	2005 – 2008	
Francesca Semoso	2008 – 22 January 2009	
Andrew Miriki	22 January 2009 – 15 June 2015	
Simon Pentanu	15 June 2015 – present	

== Members ==
- Members of the Bougainville House of Representatives, 2005–2010
- Members of the Bougainville House of Representatives, 2010–2015
- Members of the Bougainville House of Representatives, 2015–2020
- Members of the Bougainville House of Representatives, 2020–2025
