= List of Papua New Guineans =

This is a list of notable Papua New Guineans, people from Papua New Guinea.

== Politics ==
- Dame Josephine Abaijah, former politician
- Sir Cecil Abel, missionary, teacher and politician
- Sir Peter Barter, former MP for Madang Regional
- Sir Julius Chan, former prime minister
- Sir John Guise, former governor general of Papua New Guinea
- Chris Haiveta, former MP and governor for Gulf
- Joseph Kabui, secessionist leader then first president of the Autonomous Region of Bougainville
- Dame Carol Kidu, MP for Moresby South
- Sir Charles Lepani, diplomat
- Sir Pita Lus, outspoken politician
- Sir Albert Maori Kiki
- Allan Marat, MP for Rabaul
- Sir Paul Lapun, first Papua New Guinean to receive a knighthood
- Sir Paulias Matane, former governor general of PNG
- John Momis, MP, current president of the Autonomous Region of Bougainville (2010–)
- Sir Mekere Morauta, former prime minister
- Jeffrey Nape, Speaker of Parliament (2007–2012)
- Sir Rabbie Namaliu, former MP for Rabaul
- Sir Joseph Nombri, politician, administrator and diploma
- Iambakey Okuk, former deputy prime minister
- Peter O'Neill, former prime minister (2012–2019)
- Francis Ona, rebel leader of Bougainville
- Don Polye, MP for Kandep and minister for Transport & Civil Aviation (2009–2011) Minister of Finance (2011–)
- Sir William Skate, former prime minister (1995–1998)
- Sir Michael Somare, "Father of the nation", three times prime minister (most recently 2002–2011)
- Luther Wenge, MP and Governor of Morobe
- Paias Wingti, former prime minister and Governor of Western Highlands
- Theo Zurenuoc, MP for Finschhafen, current Speaker of Parliament (2012–)
- John Rosso., Lae MP and PNG Deputy Prime Minister

== Sports ==
- Johnny Aba, only Papua New Guinean to compete for a world boxing title
- Makali Aizue, Rugby League
- Marcus Bai, Rugby League, three-time world club championship winner and NRL Premiership Winner
- Willie Bera, Football, PNG national football team
- Stanley Gene, Rugby League, Captain of PNG Rugby League team in 2008 Rugby World Cup
- Francis Kompaon, Paralympic sprinter, first and only PNG Paralympic or Olympic medal winner
- Edward Laboran, Athletics
- Adrian Lam, Rugby League, Sydney Roosters and PNG Rugby League coach
- Andrew Lepani, Football
- Nathaniel Lepani, Football
- Justin Olam, Rugby League
- Ryan Pini, Gold Medalist in swimming at the 2006 Commonwealth Games
- Archie Thompson, Football, Melbourne Victory and PSV striker
- Dika Loa Toua, Weightlifting
- David Yareboinen, football referee

== Others ==
- Aro, last person executed in PNG
- Lilly Be'Soer, women's rights activist, tribal conflict mediator
- Kevin Conrad, environmentalist
- Janetta Douglas, charity worker
- Sir Vincent Eri, author and former governor-general
- Florence Jaukae Kamel, artist and women's rights activist
- Joseph Kaven, physician
- Mundiya Kepanga, customary chief
- Dame Jean Kekedo, ombudsman and diplomat
- Dame Mary Kekedo, educator
- Dame Rose Kekedo, first woman to be chancellor at UPNG
- Mary Kini, peace activist
- Mazzella Maniwavie, mangrove scientist and climate activist
- Pilipo Miriye, first Papua New Guinean evangelical missionary to West Africa
- Noah Musingku, creator of purported ponzi scheme, 'Uvistract'
- Bernard Narokobi, philosopher and lawyer
- Cecilia Nembou, educator, women's rights activist, and first female vice-chancellor for a university in Papua New Guinea
- O-shen, reggae musician
- Sir Anthony Siaguru, public servant
- Jerry Singirok, military officer
- William Takaku, actor (theatre, television and film)
- Dame Meg Taylor, lawyer and diplomat
- Pamela Toliman, medical researcher
- Sir Alkan Tololo, educator and diplomat
- Megan Washington, jazz and alternative pop/rock singer
- Justin Wellington, singer
- Scott Waide Journalist
