= French frigate Cybèle =

French frigate Cybèle may refer to the following ships:

- French frigate Cybèle (1815), a Pallas-class frigate, renamed Remise in 1850
- French frigate Cybèle (1789), a Nymphe-class frigate, sunk in action in 1809

== See also ==
- Cybele (disambiguation)
