= Pamela Toliman =

Papua New Guinean medical researcher

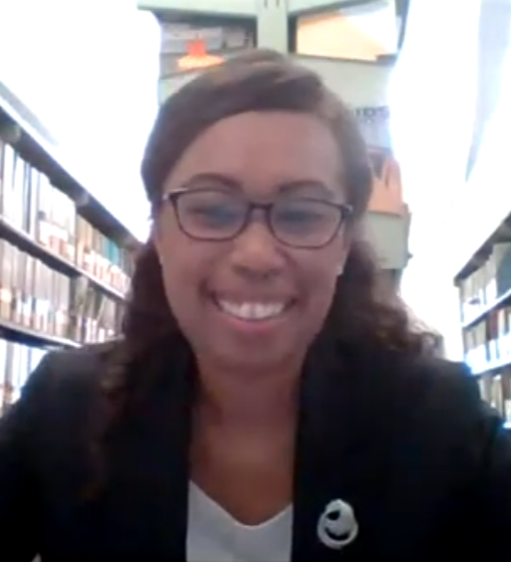
- In a Lowy Institute online discussion in 2021
- Education: University of Queensland; University of Papua New Guinea; University of New South Wales
- Occupation: Medical researcher
- Known for: Allison Sudradjat Prize winner

Pamela Toliman is a medical researcher from Papua New Guinea (PNG) who has researched areas such as sexually transmitted diseases, HIV/AIDS, cervical cancer and COVID-19.

== Early life ==
Pamela Toliman comes from Rabaul in PNG's East New Britain Province, but much of her education was in Australia. She went to high school at St Peters Lutheran College in Brisbane, Queensland and then attended the University of Queensland, where she obtained both a Bachelor of Science, majoring in molecular genetics and microbiology, and a Bachelor of Arts, majoring in sociology and gender studies, giving her, she has said, a more holistic approach to research. After graduation she joined the Papua New Guinea Institute of Medical Research (PNG IMR) in Goroka in the Eastern Highlands Province.

== Medical career ==
Toliman has remained with the PNG IMR. She initially specialized on sexually transmitted infections, including HIV/AIDS. Her first research was on the effectiveness of standard treatments for gonorrhoea in PNG, in light of an increase in antibiotic resistance. For her master's, from the University of Papua New Guinea (UPNG), she studied co-infections in those who are HIV positive. Her research provided an insight into the most common diseases that affect those living with HIV and identified the fact that people were being diagnosed as HIV positive at a late stage, which had a major impact on prognosis. In 2016, she received the Australia Award's Allison Sudradjat Prize in recognition of her outstanding qualities as a scholar and emerging leader.

Later, she investigated cervical cancer screening, for which she obtained a PhD from the Kirby Institute of the University of New South Wales in 2020. She was supported by the Australia Award Women's Leadership Initiative, being mentored by Emily Hurley, Acting Assistant Secretary at Australia's Department of Health Economics and Research Division. Cervical cancer is a preventable cancer but available statistics suggest that between 1,500 and 2,000 women die from it every year in Papua New Guinea, and the true number is likely to be much higher. Pap smear testing has not been logistically successful in PNG and Toliman researched whether a rapid human papillomavirus (HPV) test could reduce cervical cancer rates by detecting strains of HPV and seeing women with high-risk strains referred for further treatment. The country had not established a programme of prevention, screening or treatment. Her aim is to establish a national screening programme and she has been trialling a system whereby women can take a test and have the result within an hour.

Toliman is now part of a scientific team at the PNG IMR that developed PNG's in-country testing capacity for COVID-19 and advised policymakers of what was needed to effectively respond to COVID-19. At the same time, she is doing post-doctoral research into COVID-19 transmission in the population.

== Local food promoter ==
Toliman has a food blog that encourages people to use ingredients from Papua New Guinea. She started by making jam and selling it at work and expanded her activities from there.

== Publications ==
The following is a list of publications for which Toliman has been the lead author.

- 2010. "Neisseria gonorrhoeae isolates from four centres in Papua New Guinea remain susceptible to amoxycillin-clavulanate therapy". Papua and New Guinea Medical Journal 53.
- 2016. "Field evaluation of the Xpert® HPV Point of Care Test for the detection of human papillomavirus infection using self-collected vaginal and clinician-collected cervical specimens". Journal of Clinical Microbiology 54.
- 2018. "Performance of clinical screening algorithms comprising point-of-care HPV- DNA testing using self-collected vaginal specimens, and visual inspection of the cervix with acetic acid, for the detection of underlying high-grade squamous intraepithelial lesions in Papua New Guinea", Papillomavirus Research 6.
- 2018. "Evaluation of self-collected vaginal specimens for the detection of high-risk HPV infection and the prediction of high-grade cervical intraepithelial lesions in a high-burden, low-resource setting". Clinical Microbiology and Infection 25.
- 2018. "Innovative approaches to cervical cancer screening in low- and middle-income countries". Climacteric 21.
- 2019. "Evaluation of p16/Ki-67 dual-stain cytology performed on self-collected vaginal and clinician-collected cervical specimens for the detection of cervical pre-cancer". Clinical Microbiology and Infection: the official publication of the European Society of Clinical Microbiology and Infectious Diseases 26.
