= Betty Higgins =

Papua New Guinean entrepreneur

- Born: Goroka, Papua New Guinea
- Occupation: Entrepreneur

Betty Higgins is an entrepreneur from Papua New Guinea (PNG) who developed and runs a trout farm and hotel in the Mount Wilhelm area. In 2009 she was awarded the overall Women in Business Award at the Westpac Outstanding Women Awards for PNG.

== Early life ==
Higgins was born in Goroka in PNG's Eastern Highlands Province and later moved to her father's village of Yandera in Madang Province. She came from a poor background. Her mother enrolled her and her sister in a boarding school at Bundi, despite the objections of her father's relatives. She would work during school vacations in order to be able to afford her school tuition. With her father marrying a third wife, her mother left. Higgins declined to go with her and was looked after by her paternal grandmother. When Higgins wanted to transfer to a high school on the coast, her father refused to pay her airfare or school fees, wanting her to stay home and work in the gardens. The women of the village put together the cash for her airfare, but when she arrived in Madang it was discovered that she had no tuition money. The headmaster arranged for her to earn her school fees by doing housekeeping for two teachers.

While at school in Madang, Higgins used to visit patients at the Madang hospital. There she met an expatriate Englishman who, learning of her story, agreed to pay her tuition for the remainder of her high school years. She also travelled to Australia and England with the man's family. After graduating from high school, she took several jobs before becoming a flight attendant with Air Niugini, PNG's national airline. This took her all over PNG as well as to Australia and Asia. She married an expatriate in PNG's capital, Port Moresby. The couple had a daughter but the relationship broke down because of the large number of her relatives who expected to stay with them and because of her husband's substance abuse.

== Entrepreneurial activities ==
Her second husband, Ken Higgins, an engineer, helped finance several businesses that she set up in Yandera, including buying coffee. This eventually failed because the demands of the people in Yandera made it impossible to run a profitable operation and because a local church forced the closure of the bar she operated. In the 1990s, together with her husband, Higgins bought 40 hectares of land close to the village of Kegesugl in the foothills of Mount Wilhelm. The mountain, the highest in PNG, is 4,509 metres (14,793 ft) above sea level. The lodge that Higgins built on her land, to serve as a stop-off point for people wanting to climb Mount Wilhelm, is at 2,800 metres (9,186 ft) and is a three-hour drive on a poor road from the Highlands Highway, the main road from the highlands to the coast. After establishing the lodge, Higgins sought additional ways of generating income. Initially she developed a vegetable business, driving vegetables to PNG's second city, Lae, to sell to hotels and supermarkets. However, it became dangerous to travel on the Highlands Highway and Higgins was held up on four occasions. At this point her husband persuaded her to stop going to Lae.

Higgins then decided to go into trout farming, drawing on the abundance of freshwater in the area. She was the first Papua New Guinean to farm-raise trout. It was a long process to achieve success. She went to Tumut in the foothills of the Snowy Mountains in New South Wales, Australia to observe a successful trout farm. She also travelled to Japan. In 1993 she took delivery of a first consignment of fish eggs from Tasmania, but it was not until 1996 that she succeeded in growing fish. In time she developed the business and was supplying fresh trout to hotels throughout PNG. Difficulties remained, however. On 10 April 2020 there was a landslide on the road between the Highlands Highway and her lodge. It took a long time to clear, affecting both her business and those of other entrepreneurs in the area, such as a seed potato producer, with the only way in and out being by plane. Higgins' plans to expand her lodge were put on hold as it was impossible to bring in construction materials.

Higgins was part of the Australian government's pilot Laikim Sister programme, which brings together ten Indigenous Australian and ten Papua New Guinean female business owners.

== Politics ==
In 1989 Higgins ran an unsuccessful political campaign for a seat in the Madang provincial government. As the first woman from her area to run for office, she encountered prejudice from both men and women for acting "like a man" and putting herself too much in the public eye. In the 2007 Papua New Guinean general election she ran for the Usino-Bundi Open constituency, but finished 23rd out of 34 candidates.

== Awards ==
- Higgins received the 2009 overall PNG Westpac Women in Business Award. In the same ceremony she was also given the Dalton Entrepreneur Award.
