= Raylance Mesa =

Papua New Guinean environmentalist

- Born: Tami Islands, Morobe Province, Papua New Guinea (PNG)
- Occupation: Architect
- Known for: Youngest winner of the Westpac Outstanding Women Award in PNG

Raylance Mesa is a Papua New Guinean architect and climate activist from the Tami Islands in Morobe Province. She has worked with island communities on climate-change adaptation projects, including coastal protection and planned relocation. In 2019, at the age of 24, she received the Westpac Outstanding Woman Award and its Young Achiever’s Award for this work.

== Early life ==
Raylance Mesa comes from the Tami Islands, which are off Finschhafen on the Huon Peninsula in the Morobe Province of Papua New Guinea. She attained a bachelor's degree with merit in Architecture at the Papua New Guinea University of Technology (Unitech), in PNG's second city of Lae, between 2014 and 2018.

The island that Mesa comes from is sinking as a result of climate change, with differences in sea levels clearly noticeable. She started to work with her community to make changes at the age of 16. Building sea walls to protect buildings at risk of being swamped by the sea by using materials such as dead coral and tree trunks, she also organized fundraising to upgrade the island's school and to buy land on the mainland for occupation by the islanders when the sea does eventually reclaim their island.

== Career ==
Since 2019, Mesa has been employed as a Graduate Architect by ExxonMobil in PNG's capital, Port Moresby.

== Awards and honours ==
- 2019. Westpac Outstanding Woman for 2019 and Institute of Banking Business Management (IBBM) Young Achiever's Award.
- 2018. United Nations Youth Development Award. Mesa participated at the United Nations Economic and Social Council Youth Forum.
- 2017. Mesa was funded by the Kokoda Track Foundation's Archer Leaders Development Program. One of 8 final-year students chosen, she benefited from mentoring, work experience placements in New South Wales, Australia and PNG, and support for tuition fees.
- 2017. Commonwealth Youth Award for excellence in development work.
