= Cybele (disambiguation) =

Cybele is an ancient goddess of fertility. Cybele may also refer to:

== People ==
- Cybele (actress), stage name of Greek actress Cybele Andrianou (1887–1978)
- Cybele Druma, rugby player and women's sports activist in Papua New Guinea
- Cybele Kirk (1870–1957), New Zealand temperance and welfare worker, suffragist and teacher
- Cybele Rowe (born 1963), Australian ceramic artist
- C. Cybele Raver, American developmental psychologist
- Cybèle Varela (born 1943), Brazilian artist

== Arts and entertainment ==
- Cybele (sculpture), a statue by Auguste Rodin
- Cybele (comics), an Eternal from Marvel Comics
- Cybelle (comics), a Morlock from Marvel Comics
- Cybele (doujinshi), a lolicon dōjinshi by the manga artist Hideo Azuma
- Cybele Records, a German record label founded in 1994
- Cibele (video game), a 2015 video game

== Naval vessels ==
- French frigate Cybèle (1789), a frigate which served in the Napoleonic Wars
- Cybele-class mine destructor vessel, a Second World War Royal Navy class of trimarans
  - HMS Cybele
- USS Cybele, a general stores issue ship that served in World War II

== Science ==
- Cybele (trilobite), a genus of trilobite
- Cybele asteroids, a group of asteroids in the main belt
  - 65 Cybele, an asteroid

== See also ==
- Plaza de Cibeles, a famous square and fountain in Madrid, Spain, named for the goddess
  - Fountain of Cybele (Madrid) (Fuente de Cibeles or La Cibeles), the fountain in center of the square
  - Cybele Palace (Palacio de Cibeles), a building complex located on a side of the square
- Cibell or Cebell, a musical composition named for the goddess
- Cibelle, Brazilian visual artist and musician Cibelle Cavalli Bastos (born 1978)
- Cibel, name of Anarto–SVK, a Belgian cycling team, in 2014 and 2015
