= Rose Kekedo =

Papua New Guinea educator (1942–2005)

Dame Rose Kekedo DBE
- from her biography by Eric Johns
- Born: Rosalina Violet Kekedo; 1942; Abau, Central Province, Papua New Guinea
- Died: 25 February 2005 (aged 62–63); Port Moresby
- Occupations: Teacher, lecturer, administrator
- Known for: First woman Chancellor of the University of Papua New Guinea

Dame Rosalina Violet Kekedo DBE (1942 – 25 February 2005), better known as Rose Kekedo, was a leading educator in Papua New Guinea (PNG) and the first woman to be chancellor of the University of Papua New Guinea.

== Early life ==
Rosalina Violet Kekedo's parents, Mary Angela and Walter Kekedo came from Milne Bay Province and Central Province in Papua New Guinea. Rose, as she would be known, was born in 1942 in Abau, Central Province, where her father, Walter, worked as a clerk and her mother, Mary, was a teacher. She was the second eldest in a family of ten children, six girls and four boys. When she was three years old, the family moved to Kokoda in what is now Oro Province.

Her mother, who would subsequently be made a Dame Commander of the Order of the British Empire (DBE), set up a school in the area, which would eventually have 200 children, and was also actively involved in helping women to improve their lives.

Kekedo's education was interrupted by the 18 January 1951 eruption of Mount Lamington, which forced her mother's school to close. She was sent to another school, describing her two years there as the loneliest time of her life. After completing primary education, she was sent to an intermediate school in Popondetta, where she completed a teacher training course at the age of 13. At that time girls comprised only 20% of students in primary schools in Papua New Guinea and few entered secondary school. In 1956, she was one of 20 students from PNG to win a scholarship to study in Australia and went to the Good Samaritan College in Harlaxton, Queensland. On returning from Queensland, Kekedo undertook a further teacher training course at Port Moresby Teachers College and gained a Diploma in School Administration. She returned to Australia at the age of 23 for three weeks, as a guest teacher in Canberra.

== Career ==
In 1967, Kekedo represented PNG at a meeting of the United Nations in New York City, the first woman to do this. In 1968 she became a lecturer at Madang Teachers College, the first Papua New Guinean woman to hold such a position and also lectured at Goroka Teachers College. She became the president of the Teachers' Union, campaigning for equal pay and conditions for women teachers.

She was a member of the organising committee for the Pacific Games held in Port Moresby in 1969. In the same year she went to the University of Northern Colorado in the USA, which specialises in teacher education. She graduated in 1972 becoming, at the time, one of few Papua New Guineans with a tertiary degree.

In 1973, she became the Associate Deputy Principal and in 1974, she became the first female principal of Port Moresby Teachers College. In 1979, she was the first woman appointed to the Teaching Service Commission. She later worked for government departments, becoming the first female head of the Department of Community and Family Services in 1980, and the first female head for the Department of Labour in 1983.

In 1990, she joined Steamships Pty Ltd, becoming one of the first women in a senior position in a leading PNG company. In 1996, she was appointed chancellor of the University of Papua New Guinea, the first woman to hold this position. In addition, she was an office bearer of the YWCA and the St John's Association For The Blind.

== Awards and honours ==
- Kekedo received honorary Doctorates from the University of Papua New Guinea and the Papua New Guinea University of Technology.
- She was appointed a Member of the Order of the British Empire (MBE) in 1979 for service in the field of education. She was promoted in 1988 to an Officer of the Order of the British Empire (OBE), for services to education and the community.
- In the 1995 Birthday Honours, Kekedo was promoted to Dame Commander of the Order of the British Empire (DBE) for services to commerce and sports, becoming the second woman in her family to receive this honour after her mother, Dame Mary Kekedo. In 2020, her sister, Jean Kekedo, was also given the same award.

== Death ==
Kekedo died on 25 February 2005 at her home in Boroko, Port Moresby. She had suffered from arthritis, had become bedridden and refused further medical treatment after having had an earlier operation in 2003. Kekedo never married but raised three nephews and a niece.

== Bibliography ==
- Eric Johns (2002). Dame Rose Kekedo. South Melbourne, Australia: Pearson and Longman. ISBN 978-0733933301.
