= Serero =

Serero is the surname of the following people:

- David Serero (architect) (born 1974), French architect
- David Serero (opera singer) (born 1981), French opera singer, actor, producer and philanthropist
- Pepetua Serero (died 1989), Bougainvillean activist in Papua New Guinea
- Thulani Serero (born 1990), South African football midfielder
