= Lesieli Taviri =

Lesieli Moala Taviri is a businesswoman and chief executive from Papua New Guinea. In 2014 she was the winner of the Westpac Outstanding Women Award in Papua New Guinea. She is currently Executive General Manager Banking & PNG Country Head for PNG-based Kina Bank.

== Education ==
Taviri has a Bachelor of Science from the Papua New Guinea University of Technology and an MBA from the Torrens University, Adelaide, Australia. She is a Harvard Alumni, having graduated from the Harvard School of Business Advanced Management Program.

== Career ==
In 2008 Taviri joined Origin Energy PNG as corporate services manager and later moved into sales, marketing and business development positions before being appointed Chief Executive of the Papua New Guinea operation in September 2012. She was the first woman to lead the organisation.

Taviri joined Kina Bank in 2020 and was subsequently appointed Executive General Manager and PNG Country Head in November 2011.

Taviri is the chair of the Papua New Guinea Business Coalition for Women, an organisation which provides businesses with programs to develop the capacity of their female employees. This program initiated the Bel Isi initiative, a business-sponsored family sexual violence refuge centre. She is also on the board of the Australia Pacific Training Coalition.
