= Westpac Outstanding Women Award =

Award recognizing female professionals in Papua New Guinea

The Westpac Outstanding Women Awards (shortened to WOW Award) recognizes exceptional professional work of women in Papua New Guinea. Since its inception in 2002, when it was called the Westpac Women in Business Award, the Award has recognized the achievements of individual women in multiple categories. Each category awardee then becomes a finalist for the overall WOW Award. In the face of acknowledged gender inequity in the country, the WOW Awards call attention to the crucial and highly skilled work done by women across a number of sectors. The winner of the WOW Award receives a grant to pursue a formal education, professional mentoring, opportunities for professional learning and networking at an Australian Executive Women's Leadership symposium, and a cash prize. The WOW Awards support the belief that investment in women leads to stronger economic outcomes for a nation as a whole, and strives to provide role models for the girls and women of the country.

In 2025, after a five-year hiatus, Westpac Papua New Guinea relaunched its Westpac Outstanding Women Awards with a renewed strategy aimed at promoting gender equality and leadership development. The renewed initiative reflects Westpac's ongoing commitment to supporting women in business, community leadership, and professional sectors across Papua New Guinea. The award seeks to recognize and celebrate outstanding contributions by women who demonstrate leadership, innovation, and impact in their respective fields.

Nominations for the 2026 Westpac Outstanding Women Awards opens in March.

== Prize categories ==
The number of categories in which women are recognized has expanded over the years:

=== Original Categories ===
- Public Sector Award
- Entrepreneurship Award
- Private Sector Award
- Community Responsibility Award
- Young Achiever
- Westpac Women in Business Award (changed in 2013 to Westpac Outstanding Women Award)

=== Categories added in 2015 ===
- Sports Award
- Not for Profit Award

=== Category changes in 2025 ===
- Sports to Sports and Arts Advocate Award
- Community to Sustainability Award

== Sponsorship ==
Westpac Papua New Guinea, a subsidiary of Westpac Banking Corporation of Australia, is the primary sponsor and organizer of the award.

Other companies have joined in sponsoring one or more awards over the years. Typically, these companies contribute cash to sponsor a prize for the finalist in each category, which supports those finalists in continuing their work.

== Nominations ==
The WOW Awards extend a call for nominations each year, and filed an average of 70-80 nominations annually. Nominations for the 2026 Westpac Outstanding Women Awards opens in March. All nominations are to be submitted online via the Westpac Outstanding Women Awards webpage.

== Selection of recipients ==
In 2016, there were over 100 nominations. From among these nominations, a judging panel composed of representatives from Westpac, high-level sponsors, and the community picks a first round of finalists. Judges interview each finalist to assess their: capacity to lead, influence, and inspire others in pursuit of challenging goals; record of operating with integrity and good governance; achievement in appropriate areas, such as school, sports, or professional activities; and personal and professional values. Ultimately, the panel selects one finalist per category, and from among these nominees select the overall Westpac Outstanding Woman Awardee.

== Award recipients ==
Year	Award	Recipient
2007-2008	Young Achievers	Samantha Maria Andreas
2009	Overall Westpac Women in Business Award	Betty Higgins
2009	PricewaterhouseCoopers Private Sector Award	Mary Handen
2009	Daltron Entrepreneur Award winner	Betty Higgins
2009	Cardno Acil Public Sector Award	Dr. Rona Nebita Nadile
2009	Trukai Community Responsibility Award	Tessie Soi
2009	IBBM Young Achievers’ Award	Monica Pomat
2011	Overall Westpac Women in Business Award	Sarah Haoda Todd
2011	SP Brewery Entrepreneur Award	Sarah Haoda Todd
2011	PricewaterHouseCoopers Private and Corporate Sector Award	Monica Toisenegila
2011	Mineral Resource Development Co (MRDC) Public Sector Award	Naomi Faik-Simet
2011	Young Achiever's Award	Sylvia Pascoe
2011	Trukai Community Responsibility Award	Rosemary Vartuam Sovek
2012	Overall Westpac Women in Business Award	Susil Nelson
2012	Steamship Public Sector Award	Eleina Butuna
2012	SP Brewery Entrepreneur Award	Helam Koaik
2012	IBBM Young Achiever's Award	Naime Tom
2012	Trukai Community Responsibility Award	Mary Pohei
2012	PricewaterhouseCoopers Private and Corporate Sector Awards	Florence Lou Willie
2013	Overall Westpac Outstanding Women Award	Maria Linibi
2013	Steamship Public Sector Award	Dr Mobumo Kiromat
2013	SP Brewery Entrepreneur Award	Sarah Shelley
2013	IBBM Young Achiever's Award	Dorish Cheryl Mondo Mulas
2013	Trukai Community Responsibility Award	Maria Linibi
2013	PricewaterhouseCoopers Private and Corporate Sector Awards	Anthonia Apurel
2014	Overall Westpac Outstanding Women Award	Lesieli Taviri
2014	Steamship Public Sector Award	Esther Roibete Apuahe
2014	SP Brewery Entrepreneur Award	Christina Josephine Cragnolini
2014	IBBM Young Achiever's Award	Mazzella Maniwavie
2014	Trukai Community Responsibility Award	Penny Sage-embo
2014	PricewaterhouseCoopers Private and Corporate Sector Awards	Lesieli Taviri
2015	Overall Westpac Outstanding Women Award	Janet Sape
2015	Steamship Public Sector Award	Janet Sios
2015	SP Brewery Entrepreneur Award	Joyce Kiage
2015	IBBM Young Achiever's Award	Michelle Boyama
2015	Trukai Community Responsibility Award	Beverly Pambali-Piawu
2015	PricewaterhouseCoopers Private and Corporate Sector Awards	Janet Sape
2015	Pacific Assurance Group Public Sector Award	Dr. Evelyn Lavu
2015	Moore Printing Sport Award	Veitu Diro
2016	Overall Westpac Outstanding Women Award	Bosa Togs
	Steamship Public Sector Award	Dorothy Lamin Koch-Waluta
	SP Brewery Entrepreneur Award	Rita Jaima Paru
	IBBM Young Achiever's Award	Jacqueline Joseph
	Trukai Community Responsibility Award	Annastascia Wanasawo
	PricewaterhouseCoopers Private and Corporate Sector Awards	Bosa Togs
	Pacific Assurance Group Public Sector Award	Dr Lutty Amos
	Moore Printing Sport Award	Julienne Leka-Maliaki
2017-2018	Overall Westpac Outstanding Women Award	Ruth Jewels Kissam
2017-2018	Precinct Public Sector Award	Mollina Mercy Kapal
2017-2018	SP Brewery Entrepreneur Award	Dorothy Luana
2017-2018	IBBM Young Achiever's Award	Crystal Kewe
2017-2018	Trukai Community Responsibility Award	Ruth Kissam
2017-2018	Steamships Not For Profit Award	Priscilla Kevin
2017-2018	PricewaterhouseCoopers Private and Corporate Sector Awards	Karo Lelai
2017-2018	Moore Printing Sport Award	Cybele Druma
2019	Overall Westpac Outstanding Women Award	Raylance Mesa
2019	ExxonMobil PNGLNG Public Sector Award	Betty Jacobs
2019	SP Brewery Entrepreneur Award	Vani Nades
2019	IBBM Young Achiever's Award	Raylance Mesa
2019	Trukai Community Responsibility Award	Freda Yakio
2019	PricewaterhouseCoopers Private and Corporate Sector Awards	Hillary Turnamur
2019	Moore Printing Sport Award	Margaret Aka
2019	Steamships Not For Profit Award	Petra Arfeae
Year	Overall Westpac Outstanding Women Award	Anne-Shirley Korave
2025	Entrepreneur Award	Violet Bukon
2025	Not-for-Profit	Delsie Casper Nick
2025	Private Sector	Raka Numa Raula
2025	Public Sector	Dr Pamela Toliman
2025	Sports & Arts Advocate	Rutha-Mea Omenefa
2025	Sustainability	Anne-Shirley Korave
2025	Young Achiever	Julie Rereve
