= Joanne Clarkson =

Papua New Guinean police officer

- Born: Manus Province, Papua New Guinea (PNG)
- Occupation: Police officer
- Known for: First woman Deputy Police Commissioner in PNG

Joanne Clarkson is Deputy Commissioner of Police, one of the top three positions in the Royal Papua New Guinea Constabulary. She is the first woman to reach this level in the organization.

== Early life ==
Joanne Clarkson was born in Manus Province in Papua New Guinea (PNG). Her father died when she was still unborn and her mother later remarried, to John Clarkson, an Australian, whose surname Joanne took. In 1996, at the age of 19, she was working as a teacher's assistant at the Our Lady of Sacred Heart International School (OLSH) in Kavieng, New Ireland Province, when her parents applied for her take part in a training programme to become a member of the police force. Successful, she took part in cadet officer training at Bomana in Port Moresby, PNG's National Capital District, Papua New Guinea, from 1996 to 1998. There were 25 students in her squad at the start of training; only 15 graduated and she was the only woman. She was the top student in the squad.

== Career ==
After graduating, Clarkson worked at a local police station in Port Moresby, before being transferred to the Royal Papua New Guinea Constabulary headquarters to work in the field of corporate planning. She accepted this move with reluctance as she had wanted to work on criminal investigation. She stayed at the headquarters for 13 years, with successive promotions, working on activities such as managing the force's strategic planning, monitoring and evaluation, and budgeting. In 2013 she was the first woman to be promoted to Chief Superintendent. From 2015 to 2019 she worked in the Autonomous Region of Bougainville as chief of police for the region, being appointed as Assistant Commissioner in 2016. She returned to the capital as Deputy Commissioner of Police (Administration).

In 2019 Clarkson officially opened the first all-woman training programme for PNG police, designed to address the imbalance in the number of female police in the force. In 2021, she was appointed as one of the three members of the Police Promotions and Appointments Board, chaired by Dame Jean Kekedo.

== Personal life ==
Clarkson has three sons, who she has raised as a single parent.

== Awards and honours ==
Clarkson was awarded the Queen's Police Medal in the 2016 Birthday Honours of Queen Elizabeth II.
