= Janet Sape =

PNG netball player & business leader (1959-2017)

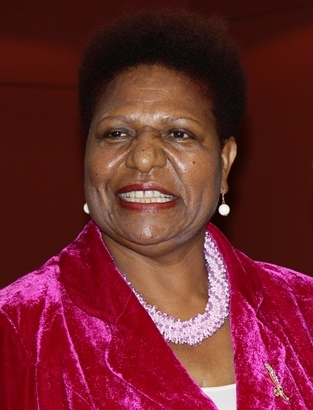
- Sape in 2015

Personal information
- Full name: Janet Sape
- Born: 1959 Wabag, Papua New Guinea
- Died: July 28, 2017 (aged 57–58)
- Occupation: leader

Netball career
Years	Club team	Apps
1980s	DSA Sisters	
Years	National team	Caps
?? - 1989	Papua New Guinea	

Janet Kaki Sape (1959 - 28 July 2017) was a business leader and international netball player, coach and administrator from Papua New Guinea. She was active in promoting women's empowerment issues in the country, and received a number of awards for her work.

== Netball ==
In the 1980s, Sape founded the Lae-based netball club DSA Sisters. The club got its name because most of the players were sisters.

Sape represented Papua New Guinea at the 1987 World Netball Tournament, and also in a number of tournaments in Oceania. One tournament she participated in was the Pacific Games. During her time as a member of the national team, she also served as the captain. She retired from international play in 1989.

Sape later coached the national team. She was at the helm for the 1995 South Pacific Games, when Papua New Guinea took home a silver medal. Players she coached on this level included Gamini Koroka. Sape also served as a netball commentator. She did this for the 1991 South Pacific Games.

== Sports administration ==
Sape went on to become president of the Papua New Guinea Netball Federation in 1999, a role she would continue to hold until 2001. She was also part of an initiative to encourage girls in more rural parts of the country to get involved in the sport, working on a project towards this goal in 2013. At the time, she commented that if the government can spend money on developing rugby union for men, they can spend money on developing netball for women. These sorts of comments were ones she had made repeatedly, including to the media the night before the 2012 PNG Netball Federation's Annual Fundraising Ball.

In 2000, PNGSF and NOC created the Women in Sports Commission following the 2000 International Women in Sports Conference. Sape, who was the President of the PNG Netball Federation at the time, was selected as a committee member.

Sape continued to support women becoming involved in sports administration, serving as part of the 2016 Women in Sports Leadership in Port Moseby.

== Business ==
Sape was initially trained as a teacher before moving into business advising for women. She mentored women to start up and manage small businesses and later started Women in Business in 2005 as a network to support and connect women entrepreneurs in Papua New Guinea. The group began with a small number of women totalling around 50 and grew to have more than 15,000 by 2015, and 20,000 members by 2017. She served as the organization's President and Executive Director.

Sape believed that events like the Pacific Games were an opportunity for women entrepreneurs to provide an international platform for their goods and services. When her country hosted the Games, she was involved in encouraging many women to set up stands to sell their goods at. She also encouraged women to take control of their own resources to form their own business, giving specific encouragement to women in rural areas.

Sape also founded a microfinance institution, Women's Microbank in 2014, the first bank of its kind in the South Pacific region, and the fourth in the world. NCD Governor Powes Parkop commended her for her efforts in creating the microbank. She also served as the President of the PNG Women in Business Foundation (PNGWiB), an organization founded in 2006. In 2014, she attended the Women in Business Conference.

== Politics and activism ==
Sape was well known in her country for her activism related to women's empowerment. Sape was an unsuccessful candidate in four national elections, including the election of July 2017 where she ran for the North-West seat in the Port Moresby general elections. She had previously run for the same seat in 2002, coming in fifth in a 32 deep field. In 2006, she ran for governor of Port Moseby, coming in second. She ran for the same seat in the 2012 elections, finishing third. In 2012, she participated in the PNG Practice Parliament for Women. This was part of her efforts to prepare women to run for Parliament as the country has few women who run, and even fewer who win seats. The Practice Parliament was covered on national radio.

Serving on the National Capital District Commission Board, she represented the interests of women and girls. In 2014, she served as the NCDC's commissioner.

== Background ==
Sape was born and raised in Wabag, the capital of Enga Province and initially trained as a teacher before moving into business advising for women. The switch in career trajectory came after a personal realization that she had talent in business. She had six children. As of 2012, she had two grandchildren. Sape died on 28 July 2017 from leukemia.

== Awards ==
In 2015, Sape was named by APEC as the first winner of Papua New Guinea's Iconic Women Award. In the same year, she was named Westpac's Outstanding Woman of the Year.
