= Ruth Kissam =

Papua New Guinean human rights advocate

- Born: Enga Province, Papua New Guinea (PNG)
- Other names: Ruth Jewels Kissam
- Occupations: Community organiser and human rights activist

Ruth Kissam is a community organizer and a human rights activist who has focused on Sorcery Accusation Related Violence (SRV) in Papua New Guinea. She was awarded the Westpac Outstanding Woman (WOW) Award in Papua New Guinea in 2018.

== Early life ==
Ruth Jewels Kissam was born in Enga Province. Her father worked as an interpreter for missionaries, which required him and his family to frequently relocate to different villages. Graduating from high school in 1998 she, with support from her father, resisted pressure from some family members for her to marry, because they wanted to benefit from the bride price, and went to the University of Papua New Guinea in PNG's capital, Port Moresby, to study law. She did not complete her degree because of the need to return home to look after her siblings when her mother was ill.

== Career ==
While she was with her family, Kissam began to work with local communities to build and maintain their airstrip and build school classrooms. In settlement areas near PNG's third-largest city of Mount Hagen she ran a sports programme called Sanap Wantaim (Stand up together), to share information about HIV and AIDS. She arranged a mentorship programme for young girls in 2009 called "Women of Wisdom", aiming to help girls adjust to going to university. She also organised various communities to police themselves. Through her community-engagement work she came across the body of a woman accused of sorcery who had been murdered. She ensured that the woman had a proper burial. This was the beginning of her work on sorcery-accusation related violence, which is a major problem in Papua New Guinea.

Kissam then worked at Malaumanda Development Corporation (Aiaba Minerals), a mining company owned by indigenous landowners, advocating for the right of indigenous people to control the development of their own land. She then moved to a law company, addressing gender-based violence and sorcery accusation related violence. In 2013, she collaborated with others to play a critical role in repealing the colonial Sorcery Act of 1973 and amending the criminal code to include crimes committed on allegations of sorcery. In 2016, she became director of operations for the PNG Tribal Foundation, a nonprofit organization that works in areas of maternal and child health, education, and gender-based violence. She led the Senisim Pasin (Change Behaviour) film campaign, a national campaign to change cultural attitudes about how women are valued in PNG. In 2021, she joined Catalpa International, an international development organization working in PNG, that aims to use technology to create lasting developmental impact. She is also General Manager: Corporate Affairs of the Steamships company in PNG.

In 2021, Kissam was the president of the board of the Advancing PNG Women Leadership Network and a committee member of the PNG National Human Rights Commission.

== Further training ==
In 2015 Kissam participated in the IREX Community Solutions Program at George Mason University in Virginia, USA. This program is for already engaged community leaders to strengthen their skills to impact the complex economic, environmental, political, and social challenges in their communities. In 2017 she was a participant in California at the annual Draper Hills Summer Fellowship Program on Democracy and Development at Stanford University's Center for Democracy, Development and the Rule of Law. In 2019-20 she was the first Papua New Guinean to be an Obama Foundation scholar at Columbia University in New York City, as well as being an intern at the Foundation.

== Awards and honours ==
- In 2018 Kissam won the overall Westpac Outstanding Women Award (WOW) for Papua New Guinea as well as the Trukai Community Responsibility Award.
