= Crystal Kewe =

Co-founder and CEO of software development company Crysan

Crystal Kewe is a web and app developer based in Papua New Guinea and the CEO and CTO of Crysan Technology Ltd.

== Early life and education ==
Kewe's interest in programming started with an interest in video gaming, and around age 12, she started teaching herself to program software writing in python. She attended Paradise High School in Papua New Guinea up until grade 10, in 2014, after which she stopped going to school and continued pursuing a self-created education in programming.

Kewe intended on seeking a college degree in New Zealand in 2022.

=== Advocacy ===
Kewe has been a guest lecturer at the University of Papua New Guinea, and she currently serves as on the academic advisory board for Papua New Guinea's International Training Institute. She says that the supportive infrastructure is the most important part of successful educational systems, and that institutions do not fairly support different groups of people, highlighting girls as a marginalized group in scientific and technical education.

== Career ==
In 2014, Kewe and her father co-founded the technology company Crysan when she was 15, making her one of the world's youngest CEO's of a software development company. The company has since expanded to include a team of over 20 employees, some of whom are based in Southeast Asia, Europe, and South America, and has partnered with the Papua New Guinea government on education initiatives as well as building a platform designed to provide transparency surrounding public development funding.

=== Apec App Challenge ===
Kewe and her father won first prize in the 24-hour hackathon which is a partnership between Apec, The Asia Foundation, and Google. The challenge was to “build an app that would help bilum artisans and entrepreneurs in Papua New Guinea," as bilum makers often face difficult hurdles selling their crafts. The team won for the conception and development of an app called Biluminous which is an e-commerce platform that features bilum makers and highlights their process while connecting them directly with customers, and is one of the first mobile payment providers in Papua New Guinea.

== Awards ==
- 2018 APEC Digital Prosperity Award
- 2019 Papua New Guinea Security Congress Award for Excellence in Individual Achievement
- Coral Sea Cable System Repeater Dedicatee, Dec 2019
- 2019 Westpac Outstanding Women Awards - IBBM Young Achievers Award
