= Goroka Urban LLG =

Local-level government in Papua New Guinea

- Country: Papua New Guinea
- Province: Eastern Highlands Province
- Time zone: UTC+10 (AEST)

District map of Eastern Highlands Province

Goroka Urban LLG is a local-level government (LLG) of Eastern Highlands Province, Papua New Guinea.

== Wards ==
- 80. Goroka Urban
- 85. Bihute
