= Rona Nadile =

Public servant and a whistleblower from Papua New Guinea

Dr. Rona Nibeta Nadile (born 1951) worked for the Department of Labour and Industrial Relations (DLIR) of Papua New Guinea (PNG), with a focus on legal frameworks for managing foreign workers. In 2009 the Westpac Women in Business Awards recognized her contributions with the Cardno Acil Public Sector Award. A few years later, she was dismissed after twice exposing political corruption within the national government.

== Education ==
Nadile grew up in Samarai, Milne Bay, Papua New Guinea, before traveling to the provincial capital, Alotau, to attend Cameron Secondary School. She left in 1971 to attend Kerevat National High School, an 11–12 grade government-funded school in Kerevat, East New Britain. She graduated from the school and later sat on its Board of Governors. A graduate of the University of Papua New Guinea, class of 1976, and Goroka Teachers' College, she then went on to study at the University of Reading, in the United Kingdom, and the University of South Australia in Adelaide, South Australia. At the Australian National University, her Ph.D. thesis was entitled: In Search of a Vocation: The Case for Vocational Training in Papua New Guinea. Nadile later studied at Colorado State University in Fort Collins, Colorado, US.

Nadile is a member of the U.S. Embassy's PNG-USA Alumni Association, recognizing Papua New Guineans who have participated in U.S. government-sponsored exchange programs.

== Career ==
Longstanding tensions between immigrant and overseas workers in PNG motivated the Department of Labour and Industrial Relations (DLIR) to encode laws to clarify the administration of work visas. Nadile fostered collaboration between the government, industrial, and civil sectors in PNG during the process of crafting and implementing these new laws. Their goal was to ensure that companies could hire foreign workers where appropriate, without impacting the employment of PNG's citizens.

Nadile's work included explaining the following requirements for workers visas to the public:

1. Language
  - The Employment of Non-Citizens Act of 2007, Section 17 - Language Requirements, states: "(1) The Secretary may not grant a work permit unless the Secretary is satisfied that a noncitizen is proficient in English, Pisin or Hiri Motu."
  - The Work Permit Guideline published on January 1, 2009, by the Department of Labour and Industrial Relations tasks itself with "Undertak[ing] an assessment of the applicant’s English language proficiency." The Guideline outlines a variety of ways that an individual may prove proficiency, including employer-provided training either in their home countries or when they arrive in PNG.
2. Furthermore, both the 2007 Act and the 2009 Guidelines emphasize that foreign workers must possess specialized skills, to balance the rights of PNG citizens to employment with the needs of corporations to have skilled workers.

In 2008, raids by the DLIR led to the arrest of 233 Chinese workers associated with the Ramu nickel mine, majority-owned by China Metallurgical Construction Group Corp and located in Madang, Highlands. The workers did not possess proper work permits, but business visas for entry primarily issued by the PNG consulate in Belgium. A number of violent clashes subsequently broke out at the Ramu nickel mine. Dissatisfaction grew amongst local Papua New Guineans that Chinese workers did not speak English, had actually dropped the required English classes, and often lacked appropriate education regarding mining work. In May 2009, while speaking about these laws at the 25th Australia-PNG Business Council Forum, Nadile stated that when she tried to turn down the work visa applications due to these issues, the corporation went over her head to the Prime Minister's office, which demanded that she "make it happen ... because the agreement has been signed to develop the Ramu nickel project". Among other accounts of that talk, The National reported on the "Permit Fiasco" exposed by Nadile on May 20, 2009. The Prime Minister, Sir Michael Somare, joked on May 26 that he knew foreigners could get work permits for a bribe as small as "a six pack", stating that the Department of Immigration should do a better job. A press release from the DLIR, entitled "Clarification on media reports as published in The National paper dated 20th May 2009 with the headline 'Permit Fiasco'" David K.G. Tibu, Secretary of the Foreign Employment Division, reversed the Department's position, pointing out that "in the interest of the nation and for a good cause" work permits could be distributed to foreigners not meeting the required qualifications.

Despite this change in direction, Nadile remained in her role at the DLIR. Until she became a whistleblower again in September 2011, when she charged Secretary George Vaso, her boss, with "gross misappropriation and inappropriate" use of government funds and went public with her report. She questioned why the Secretary's contingent of eight employees needed to have an 18-day trip to Fiji for conference work that was lasting only eight days, and for which K241,867 was withdrawn for "travel, clothing, and incidental expenses", as well as a K500,000 trip to Geneva. Secretary Vaso responded publicly that "opportunists" and "faceless hypocrites" were slandering him. Vaso confirmed that his use of funds was outside the allowable reasons, but argued the guidelines for spending were "well overdue for review". Nadile was suspended for going public. A group of fourteen police officers showed up at her home late one night to repossess her car. Huge public outcry demonstrated public support for Nadile. During the two years she was suspended and undergoing disciplinary procedures, Nadile reached the compulsory retirement age of 60. When finally allowed to return to work in February 2013, at the age of 62, she experienced a lot of pressure to retire.

Prime Minister Peter O'Neill hired Nadile to work for his office, instead, to unify the work permit and foreigner visa process.

== Running for Office ==
Nadile ran in the 2017 General Election, hoping to win the Samarai Mura open seat in Milne Bay. She and one other woman, Monalisa Lendia, contended with 20 male candidates. She did not win the election.

== Awards ==
In the months following Nadile's exposure to illegal work visas, she was presented with awards:

- Queen's Birthday Honours 2009 – Civil Division
- Westpac Women in Business Awards 2009 – Cardno Acil Public Sector Award
