= Noah Musingku =

Bougainvillean conman (1964–2026)

- Born: 1964; Tonu, Bougainville Island, Territory of Papua and New Guinea
- Died: 12 October 2026 (aged 61–62); Tonu, Bougainville Island, Papua New Guinea
- Other name: King David Peii II
- Occupations: Con artist; micronationalist
- Years active: 1995–2026

Noah Musingku (1964 – 12 October 2026) was a Papua New Guinean con artist and fugitive from Bougainville. He began a Ponzi scheme, U-Vistract, in Port Moresby in 1998. It defrauded Papua New Guineans of hundreds of millions of kina, counting politicians among its investors, until it was declared bankrupt in 2000. Facing arrest, Musingku fled to the Solomon Islands in 2002 and to Bougainville's "no-go zone", ruled by the secessionist leader Francis Ona, in 2003.

In 2004, Musingku returned to Tonu, his village, and founded the Kingdom of Papaala, a micronation that could serve as a safe base of operations for U-Vistract under the protection of Fijian mercenaries. He proclaimed himself King David Peii II.

== Background ==
=== Early life and education ===
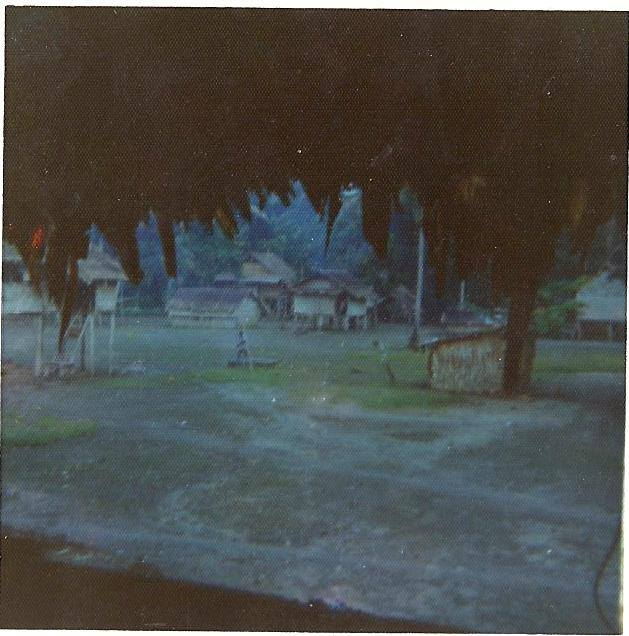
Tonu in 1977

Noah Musingku was born in 1964. He was from Tonu, a small village in Siwai, South Bougainville. Bougainville formed part of the North Solomons Province of Papua New Guinea (PNG) after PNG gained independence from Australia in 1975.

Musingku was a student at Buin High School in the late 1970s, and his classmates included Timothy Masiu, MP for South Bougainville, and James Tanis, a future president of the Autonomous Region of Bougainville (ABG). Tanis remembered Musingku as a "mysterious kind of student". He was enthralled by rags-to-riches stories, and claimed that his father was a Japanese spy during World War II who taught him how to read palms. Tanis recalled that he and his friends had once stolen school lab equipment to make "invisibility potion", the recipe having been provided by Musingku. When the potion failed to work, Musingku complained that they had made it wrong. Tanis and his friends were later discovered as the culprits behind the theft. Later on, Musingku attended Kerevat National High School on New Britain, another island of PNG. He served briefly in the Papua New Guinea Defence Force (PNGDF) after graduation.

Tanis next saw Musingku in 1988, when the two were studying at the Papua New Guinea University of Technology (Unitech) in Lae. Musingku was taking agricultural (didiman) and architectural courses but never completed them. According to Tanis, Musingku went to his architecture classes in full military uniform and ran distance races holding a wooden stick as if it were a rifle. However, Tanis said that these idiosyncrasies were "not strange to me [...] It was just a continuation of his childhood fantasies." Musingku studied political science at the University of Papua New Guinea, where he served as president of the National Union of Students in the early 1990s.

=== Bougainville conflict ===
While Musingku and Tanis were on the mainland, Bougainville became a war zone. Bougainvilleans had alleged for decades that the Panguna mine, which generated 17% of PNG's internal revenue, was environmentally destructive and that local landowners were not receiving their fair share. In 1988, the Bougainville Revolutionary Army (BRA) was formed and launched sabotage attacks on the mine. The PNGDF were unable to put down the rebels, who having completed their initial goal of shutting down the mine unilaterally declared independence in 1990.

=== Pei Mure Association ===
In the early- to mid-1990s, Musingku started a get-rich-quick scheme, the Pei Mure Association, with his brother, Messach Autahe, and attempted to involve it in the ongoing peace process. Musingku and Autahe invented a backstory along with the scheme. Pei Mure ("the law of King Pei") was the supposed legal code of Papaala, the ancient kingdom from where the earliest Bougainvilleans came. The pair claimed that a conclave of chiefs had revived Pei Mure in 1922 and supplemented it with plans for a global banking system. However, their story and all of its elements, including Pei Mure and Papaala, were entirely fictional.

In 1995, Musingku proposed a peace plan based on supposed customary practices invented by the Pai Mure Association. It contained ten steps that ended with giving Musingku and Autahe over a million dollars. The government of Papua New Guinea and the Bougainville Transitional Government seriously considered the plan, but it was rejected because of its high costs and dubious foundations. However, the Pai Mure Association was paid for travel from Port Moresby, the capital of PNG, to Bougainville.

== U-Vistract ==
Get-rich-quick schemes proliferated in Papua New Guinea after the 1997 Asian financial crisis that destabilized the national economy. Musingku registered his own, U-Vistract Finance Corporation Limited (also known as U-Vistract Financial Systems Ltd.), with the PNG Investment Promotion Authority in 1988.

U-Vistract presented itself as a financial institution. In reality, it was a type of fraud known as a Ponzi scheme, which pays off investors with investments from newer investors rather than profit generated from genuine financial activities.

Australian Securities and Investments Commission (ASIC) found U-Vistract to be an unregistered managed investment scheme with high risk.

Within a few years, some 70,000 Papua New Guineans had deposited K350 million into U-Vistract alone. U-Vistract also attracted followers in Australia, Solomon Islands and Fiji. In Australia, a small number of Queensland investors contributed some AUD500,000 between July and October 1999.

From Australia, Musingku went to Port Moresby. While in Port Moresby, he tried to set up a bank in the old Hawaiian Bank building, but he was shut down by the PNG government and forced to leave to the Solomon Islands. He began again to set up his system, but the Australian police in the Regional Assistance Mission to Solomon Islands (RAMSI) forced him out. In 2003, he travelled to Ona's headquarters in Guava, Panguna, Bougainville, and established a bank there.

== Kingship ==
Musingku stayed in the small Me'ekamui-controlled "no go zone" before returning to Tonu, his home village, in 2004. Declaring Tonu the Kingdom of Papaala, he christened himself King David Peii II, and established a 500-man militia named the "Me'ekamui Defense Force". Musingku continued his scam, which took the form of a bank. He allied with Ona, whom he personally coronated as King of Me'ekamui in May 2004. After Ona died in 2005, Musingku proclaimed himself the king of the "twin kingdoms" of Papaala and Me'ekamui. His unrecognized micronation, a small compound, remained active at the time of his death in October 2026. Other Me'ekamui factions did not recognize his authority.

Musingku's ideology was radically nationalistic and heavily influenced by the prosperity gospel and Pentecostalism, with reporter Sean Williams commenting that his style of speech bore many similarities to that of televangelists. Musingku rejects any collaboration with the Papua New Guinean government as supposedly degrading to the people of Bougainville, and was hostile to western cultural influence for similar reasons. He justified his status as King by arguing that kingship was the most universal form of leadership; allowing religious differences to be papered over.

After the 2019 Bougainvillean independence referendum, the ABG expressed an interest in integrating remaining holdouts to its authority into the independence process. The only two significant such holdouts were Musingku and Damien Koike of Konnou. Koike subsequently agreed to co-operate with the ABG, leaving Musingku as the last remaining Me'ekamui holdout. As the independence process stalled in the following years, many ABG leaders became concerned that Musingku would take advantage of delays to foment an insurrection; James Tanis expressed to Williams that Musingku's anti-western ideology could see him try and forge connections with Iran.

== Death ==
Musingku died on 12 October 2026, in his self-declared Kingdom of Papaala after a short battle with an unknown illness.

== Bibliography ==
- Cox, John (2018). Fast Money Schemes: Hope and Deception in Papua New Guinea. Indiana University Press. ISBN 9780253025609.
- Cox, John (2011). Deception and Disillusionment: Fast Money Schemes in Papua New Guinea (PhD thesis). University of Melbourne.
