= Sarah Haoda Todd =

Entrepreneur, fashion designer, and activist from Papua New Guinea

- Born: Port Moresby, Papua New Guinea
- Education: Divine Word University, Papua New Guinea University of Technology
- Occupations: Businesswoman in fashion and business services
- Title: CEO PNGian Kala and Lae Everclean
- Spouse: Gordon Todd (m. 2005)
- Children: 5

Sarah Haoda Todd is an entrepreneur, fashion designer and activist from Lae, Papua New Guinea.

After starting a cleaning business in 1997, Haoda Todd became a fashion designer, basing her designs on the art, culture, materials, and symbols of Morobe Province and Papua New Guinea.

== Education ==
In 2012, Haoda Todd completed a two-year Diploma in Management from Divine Word University, PNG. She then completed the Executive MBA program at Papua New Guinea University of Technology.

== Career ==
=== Lae Everclean ===
Prior to starting her cleaning business, she worked as an executive assistant for a mining company and as an advertising executive for a plastics and chemical manufacturer.

Haoda Todd founded Lae Everclean Limited in 1997. Originally based in Lae City, her goal was to become a laundry and dry cleaning service, but she had trouble getting the business up and running. She was turned down for small business loans three times. Lae Everclean eventually grew into a cleaning and laundry service with corporate clients, such as SP Brewery Lae and Nambawan Super Ltd. In 2008, she expanded to Port Moresby, and, by 2013, the business employed over 350 employees.

=== PNGianKala ===
In 2012, Haoda Todd founded PNGianKala (pronounced "Papua New Guinean color"), a clothing company, with the motto: "Wear your culture." She drew inspiration from the local materials of PNG, such as bilum, tattoo, and Oro tapa. She premiered her line at an Indigenous Business Council fundraiser. PNGianKala includes labels such as her Kekeni line, and Sha-mata Clothing, making American consumer products in clothing and accessories.

As PNG did not have the capacity to do digital printing on high quality silk, Haoda Todd commissioned a company overseas to do the printing. Unfortunately, when the agent saw she was from "New Guinea," her cloth was all shipped to Africa, which meant she had nothing to show. She managed to get her designs printed on to Spandex and had twelve outfits to reveal at the show.

Along with shows in Fiji, Indonesia, and Australia, Papua New Guinea Fashion and Design Week highlighted Haoda Todd's work.

Fashion retailer Jack's of PNG commissioned PNGianKala for an exclusive line of clothing in 2016.

In 2017, Haoda Todd lead an effort to launch PNGiankala Runway, a platform PNG designers can join to help raise funds to travel abroad. That same year, her newest line, honoring Susan Karike Huhume, premiered at the Pacific Resort Wear show, her third runway show in Fiji.

Haoda Todd was Secretary of the Indigenous Business Council, which aims to protect indigenous business owners and their businesses, from 2011 to 2013. As the organization had no funding, she organized a series of fundraisers to keep the council operating.

Selected runway shows include:

- Runway 2014, 2016
- PNG Fashion and Design Week
- London Pacific Fashion Week
- Fiji Fashion Week 2013, 2014
- Pacific Resort Wear show in Fiji
- Port Moresby Fashion Week 2016
- London Pacific Fashion Week in 2017, 2018

=== Women Arise PNG ===
Lae experienced widespread riots in November 2011, sparked by sexual assaults on two young women. Haoda Todd was angry that the task force to analyze these riots was entirely male, and called on the local government to appoint women to work on the investigation and repair.

She later founded Arise Women, an organization that fights against violence affecting women and children.

=== Civic activity ===
Haoda Todd has maintained an active and engaged civic life. Additionally, Haoda Todd has served as a committee member of the Papua New Guinea Red Cross Society, on the board of Habitat for Humanity, and on TISOL Board (The International School of Lae).

In 2019, Haoda Todd was one of nine local leaders tapped to lead the newly founded Morobe Health Authority (MPHA).

==== Hospital governance ====
Haoda Todd is a board member of the Angau Memorial General Hospital in Lae City. She believes that PNG's success is directly tied to the health of its citizens, and promoted programs through which the hospital helped assure individuals in rural regions access to healthcare.

==== Angau Angels ====
Haoda Todd has helped the Angau Angels organize fashion shows to raise money for the Angau Memorial General Hospital. When the 6th PNG Games were held in Lae, she directed the Angau Angels Fashion Extravaganza, which featured work from a range of PNG fashion designers, modeled by seventy young people who were born in the hospital or had otherwise benefited from its services.

== Beauty pageants ==
Herself a former Miss Papua New Guinea, Haoda Todd was a judge in the Miss South Pacific beauty pageant in 2014.

She was a judge for the Digicel PNG Foundation's 2016 Men of Honor Awards, Community Leadership category.

== Personal life ==
Originally from Poreporena, Port Moresby, she married her husband, entrepreneur Gordon Todd, on 23 July 2005. They live in Lae.

== Awards ==
- 2019 Awarded "FOUNDER AWARD" by the Kumul Gamechangers of Papua New Guinea
- 2013 "FEMALE DIRECTOR OF THE YEAR" by PNG Institute of Directors
- 2011 Awarded "Entrepreneur of the Year" Award by Westpac Business Women Awards
- 2011 Winner of Overall "Westpac Outstanding Woman", Business Woman of the Year
- 2011 Nominated for SP Brewery Entrepreneur Award
- 2012 Nominated to tour US cities, US State Department International Visitor Leadership Program (IVLP)
- 2003 Represented Papua New Guinea in Golf at the South Pacific Games in Fiji
- 1998, Represented Lae Squash Team at the National Championships in Madang
- 1992, Represented Papua New Guinea as a Pavilion Ambassador at the World Exposition in Seville, Spain
- 1989, Crowned 2nd Runner-up in the Red Cross Miss Papua New Guinea pageant
