= Mary Handen =

Businesswoman from Papua New Guinea

Mary Handen is a businesswoman from Papua New Guinea. In 2009 she won the Private Sector Award in the 2009 Westpac Outstanding Women awards in Papua New Guinea.

== Life ==
Handen trained as an accountant and held a number of positions in businesses in Papua New Guinea. In 2001 she was appointed general manager of human resources for Steamship Trading Company, becoming the first Papua New Guinean woman to hold a senior management role in the company.

Handen is the president of the Landowner Association for the Manus Detention Centre, the Australian government-owned holding centre for asylum-seekers on Manus Island; in this role she represents local people's voices regarding the use of the island for processing and holding asylum-seekers. In 2012 she led a protest demanding that local businesses receive contracts for security and building projects for the centre, rather than Australian companies.

Handen is the co-founder of Winged Mentoring & Empowerment Agency (WingedMEA), a mentorship agency. In 2016 Handen led a group of 12 women from the agency on a sponsored climb up Mount Wilhelm in Chimbu Province to raise funds for leukemia research.
