= Tessie Soi =

Papua New Guinea social worker

- Born: Gaba Gaba, Central Province, Papua New Guinea
- Other names: Tessie Tahiti Soi
- Occupation: Social worker
- Known for: Support to those suffering from HIV/AIDS

Tessie Soi is known throughout Papua New Guinea (PNG) as the founder of Friends Foundation. This organization supports people who have HIV/AIDS. She later became involved in supporting victims of family and sexual violence.

== Early life ==
Soi was born in Gaba Gaba village in PNG's Central Province, one of seven siblings. She travelled extensively around PNG in her childhood as her father was posted for work to Wewak, Vanimo, Madang and Lae. She graduated in social work from the University of Papua New Guinea in 1982 and began working at the Port Moresby General Hospital in the nation's capital in 1984.

== Work with HIV/AIDS ==
In 1989 Soi spent six months on attachment to Townsville General Hospital in Queensland, Australia, where she became aware of the impact of HIV/AIDS. On return to PNG, she tasked herself with overcoming the ignorance about AIDS in her country and started to be involved with HIV/AIDS care. At the time, people suffering from the disease were more feared than supported. Together with her husband, who she had married in 1985, she established an NGO, Friends Foundation, with twelve friends, to help people suffering from AIDS. After initially supporting it with their own resources, they found external sponsorship, including funding from the Australian Government. In 2002 and 2003 Soi earned a Master's degree under the AIDS program at James Cook University in Townsville.

Returning to Port Moresby, she decided to refocus the Friends Foundation on mothers and, increasingly, grandparents who cared for children when both parents had died from AIDS. She instituted the Orphan Buddy System, a programme to help the grandparents pay school fees.

Soi later became the clinical manager of the Port Moresby Family Support Centre, addressing issues such as family and sexual violence, and family planning.

== Awards and honours ==
- Soi received a City Pharmacy Limited's "Pride of PNG Award" in 2012 and was invited to be a judge for the 2013 awards.
- She received a Westpac Outstanding Women Award (WOW) in 2009.
- She was made an Officer of the Order of the British Empire in the 2006 Birthday Honours for her services to charity.
