= Maria Linibi =

Papua New Guinea women farmers' leader

- Born: Papua New Guinea (PNG)
- Other names: Maria Senar Linibi
- Occupation: Farmer
- Known for: Founder and president of PNG Women in Agriculture Development Foundation.

Maria Linibi is the founder and president of the Papua New Guinea Women in Agriculture Development Foundation.

== Early life ==
Maria Senar Linibi is a Papua New Guinean. She was the daughter of a coffee farmer in Papua New Guinea's Highlands Region and would often help her father. She worked for the PNG government as a liaison officer but was retrenched at the age of 38. At that time, she decided to become a farmer.

== Women in agriculture ==
Living in Morobe Province, she and her husband had considerable success as farmers. They introduced the African yam to the area and promoted the farming of peanuts, rice, sweet potatoes and other crops. Linibi trained 500 farmers and began to organize women farmers in her area. Together with her husband, Linibi founded PNG Women in Agriculture Development Foundation in 2006 to link women farmers to organizations and others who could help to address their needs. Today, the organization is active throughout the country and Linibi is a recognised spokesperson for PNG's women farmers. Despite the difficulties associated in working in a country with 800 languages and 600 islands, by 2014 the Foundation was working with 10,000 women farmers, organized into 118 groups in all of PNG's 21 provinces and the National Capital District of Port Moresby. One focus of the work has been to get women farmers to see themselves as "businesswomen" as well as farmers. Training is offered in basic bookkeeping, in part to enable farmers to approach financial institutions for loans.

Linibi is an active member of the Pacific Island Farmers Organisation Network (PIFON) and represented Pacific Island farmers at the United Nations in New York City in September 2015, when the Sustainable Development Goals were approved by the General Assembly. She is now a regular speaker at international meetings. In 2021 Linibi was appointed as a Council member of PNG's National Agricultural Research Institute.

A frequent complaint by Linibi was that women farmers received very little support from the Government. In 2020 she was successful in signing a memorandum of understanding with PNG's Department of Agriculture and Livestock to work together for agricultural development, with the intention that the Foundation's members around the country would receive support.

== Awards and honours ==
- In 2013, Linibi won the overall Westpac Outstanding Women Award for women in Papua New Guinea.
