= Bosa Togs =

Women's rights activist and businesswoman

Bosa Togs is a senior IT manager from Papua New Guinea. In 2016 she won the overall Westpac Outstanding Woman Award and the PricewaterhouseCoopers Private Sector Award.

Togs is the general manager for IT at Telikom Papua New Guinea. She successfully campaigned within the company for equal pay for women employed by Telikom, resulting in a change in remuneration policy by the corporation.

She holds two master's degrees, one in IT and one in business administration.

Togs was also the Guest speaker at the Girls In ICT Expo 2017.
