= Francis Ona =

Bougainvillean politician

- Born: February 15, 1953; Guava, Kieta District, Territory of Papua and New Guinea, Australia
- Died: July 24, 2005 (aged 52); Guava, Arawa Rural LLG, Central Bougainville District, Autonomous Region of Bougainville, Papua New Guinea
- Spouse: Elizabeth Ona (m. 1975)
- Military career
- Allegiance: Bougainville Revolutionary Army (1988–1997)
- Rank: Supreme Commander
- Conflicts: Bougainville conflict (1988–1998)

Francis Ona (15 February 1953 – 24 July 2005) was a Bougainvillean separatist who founded the Bougainville Revolutionary Army (BRA) in 1988. With Ona as Supreme Commander, the BRA fought the government of Papua New Guinea (PNG) in the Bougainville conflict.

Ona started working at the Panguna mine in 1979 but grew to resent his employers, who he alleged exploited the land with little benefit to customary landowners such as himself. The Bougainville conflict began after Ona started the BRA in 1988. It launched attacks to sabotage the mine before declaring Bougainville's independence from PNG in 1989. After the police and the army failed to defeat the guerrillas, the government withdrew from Bougainville in 1990 and the Panguna mine was abandoned.

Ona set up the Bougainville Interim Government (BIG) and appointed himself president. However, Ona fell out with other BRA factions and a protracted civil war began on Bougainville, mainly among tribal lines. PNG forces re-entered Bougainville later in 1990, slowly retaking the island and negotiating with BRA moderates. The conflict ended with a 1998 ceasefire and a 2001 peace agreement that led to the creation of the Autonomous Region of Bougainville (ABG). Refusing to disarm or recognize the ABG, Ona's faction split from the BRA and retreated into a 'no-go zone' around the mine, where Ona died in 2005.

== Early life ==
Francis Ona was born on 15 February 1953. He was a member of the Naasioi language group and a native of Guava, a village in Central Bougainville, where he had inherited secondary land rights from his father. It is unclear if he inherited any primary land rights, which among the Naasioi are inherited matrilineally from one's mother. When Ona was born, Bougainville was part of the Kieta District in the Australian-administered Territory of Papua and New Guinea, but many Bougainvilleans were dissatisfied with Australian governance.

In 1972, production began at the Panguna mine while Ona was a student at Rigo High School. The open-pit copper mine was established on resumed Naasioi land despite resistance from the indigenous landowners. It was highly lucrative for its Australian owners and the Papua New Guinea government but the locals saw little of the benefits.

Ona was trained in mine surveying at the Papua New Guinea University of Technology in Lae. He had practical studies in Madang in 1974, where he met his cousin's sister-in-law Elizabeth. The following year, Elizabeth came to Bougainville. Ona took her to Guava and they married, despite his parents' initial objections to his wife being a "redskin", from the mainland. They would have five children before 1988. Ona briefly returned to his studies in 1976, before his mother's death in October brought him home permanently.

Ona got employed as a pit surveyor for Bougainville Copper (BCL), who operated the Panguna mine, in November 1976. After a decade in the position, Ona applied to work as a haul truck driver instead. BCL records indicate that, because he was performing poorly, Ona's supervisor "counselled" him to transfer. They add that Ona "reluctantly" accepted the downgraded company housing of his new role.

Ona became increasingly critical of its operations' adverse effect on the environment and what he claimed was the low level of royalties paid to the landowners. Most of the profits left Bougainville Island, but its society was disrupted by thousands of workers from Papua New Guinea, as well as Australians. From the mid-1980s, Ona and others challenged the leadership of the Panguna Landowners Association (PLA), claiming they were not representing the interests of all the traditional landowners.

== Secessionist leader ==
The PLA's younger members broke off in 1987 and held the first meeting of the New Panguna Landowners' Association on 21 August. The New PLA was chaired by Pepetua Serero, the first cousin of Ona, who served as its secretary. It was supported by both mineworkers and the traditional opponents of the Panguna mine, Damien Dameng's Me'ekamui Pontuku Onoring. The New PLA made a number of demands, including monetary compensation for the impacts of the mine, a 50 per cent share of mine revenue to the landholders, and a transfer of ownership to Bougainville. The PNG Government set up an independent inquiry which dismissed the claims about the environmental impact but was critical of other parts of the mine's operation. In response, Ona established the Bougainville Revolutionary Army (BRA), which conducted numerous acts of sabotage against the mine including the destruction of the mine's power supply. The mine was closed by Bougainville Copper in May 1989. Ona rejected an initial compromise deal by Bougainville Copper and the Papuan government.

Ona became the acknowledged leader of the BRA after the death of Serero in 1989; Sam Kauona, a former soldier in the army, led military operations. The Papuan government sent in the police and then the army under Jerry Singirok to quell the uprising, but they were unable to do so. The island was placed under a State of Emergency under the control of the PNG Police Commissioner. The number of complaints increased about human rights abuses by PNG forces, which initially strengthened support for the BRA.

In January 1990, Bougainville Copper announced they were suspending operations at the mine. The PNG Government announced that they would withdraw troops and for international observers to verify the disarmament of the BRA. The police fled fearing for their lives in the absence of the army, and there was an attempted coup in Port Moresby over the deal.

In response to a blockade imposed by the PNG Government later in 1990, Ona said he was the head of the Bougainville Interim Government and declared independence for the island. The island descended into anarchy, as several armed factions and clans struggled for power with the PNG Government supporting these militias. The BRA leaders fell out with Joseph Kabui, the Premier of Bougainville, who had previously been a supporter.

During Prime Minister Paias Wingti's term, the PNG Government renewed military efforts and their troops captured Arawa, the provincial capital, in 1993 and recaptured the Panguna mine. Sir Julius Chan, Wingti's successor, tried to broker a deal, but neither Ona, the BRA, nor Kabui would sign a deal. Frustrated, Chan ordered a full-scale invasion in 1996 but neither Australia nor New Zealand showed willingness to support it. Chan hired Sandline International mercenaries, but the military threatened to arrest them on their arrival. Chan resigned to forestall a coup.

== Bougainville ceasefire ==
A ceasefire was arranged later in 1997 between new Prime Minister Bill Skate and Joseph Kabui, with a multi-national Peace Monitoring Group commencing operations on the island. Though Ona and the BRA controlled 90% of the island, his break with Kabui meant that the BRA representatives were not involved in the talks. Ona believed that the New Zealand-brokered peace talks were unwarranted outside interference with Bougainville governance, and did not participate.

When he interviewed Ona, the leader declared :

We have already had other forms of autonomy. The provincial government system in 1975 we were promised. Bougainvillians were promised that after 5 years or after a few years, the provincial government will be replaced by the independent nation of Bougainville. So with this in mind, with this past history, we don't trust Papua New Guinea any more....

.... 90% of Bougainvillians are supporting me. And I want to summon Prime Minister of PNG and PNG government, if 90% is not supporting me, let them carry out a referendum and we'll see.

Ona was subsequently ignored in the creation of the Autonomous Bougainville Government. At this time Ona agreed with Noah Musingku to establish a funding source for Bougainville that would allow true sovereignty. This system was developed as the U-Vistract system, which sought to use the untapped natural resources of Bougainville to finance reconstruction. Ona remained isolated in the Panguna region, which BRA controlled for the next 16 years.

== Kingship ==
On 17 May 2004, Ona declared himself "King of Bougainville" or Mekamui. He was crowned "King Francis Dominic Dateransy Domanaa, head of state of the Royal Kingdom of Me'ekamui". "Me'ekamui", meaning "holy" or "Holy Land", is an old tribal name for Bougainville. During elections for the Autonomous government in 2005, which he opposed, Ona came out of his safe haven into the public eye for the first time in 16 years. He declared that Bougainville was already independent and capable of running its own affairs.

Ona died on 24 July 2005 of malaria in his village.

== Honours ==
Ona was given a state funeral in the provincial capital of Buka.

== See also ==
- History of Bougainville
- Joseph Kabui
- Pepetua Serero
- Sam Kauona
- Noah Musingku

== Notes ==
1. Steve Marshall (25 July 2005). "Francis Ona dies of malaria". ABC Radio Australia. Archived from the original on 26 February 2009. "The Bougainville secessionist leader [...] passed away yesterday afternoon at the age of 52."

== Bibliography ==
- Hermkens, Anna-Karina (2013). "Like Moses Who Led His People to the Promised Land: Nation- and State-Building in Bougainville". Oceania. 83 (3): 192–207. ISSN 0029-8077.
- O'Callaghan, Mary-Louise (September 2002). "The origins of the conflict". Accord. No. 12. pp. 6–11.
- Oliver, Douglas L. (1991). Black Islanders: A Personal Perspective of Bougainville, 1937–1991. University of Hawaiʻi Press. ISBN 9780824814342.
