= Alkan Tololo =

Papua New Guinea public servant and diplomat

Sir Alkan Tololo

Papua New Guinea High Commissioner to Malaysia
- In office 1986–1989

Papua New Guinea High Commissioner to Australia
- In office 1983–1985
- Preceded by: Austin Sapias

Chancellor of the Papua New Guinea University of Technology
- In office 1975–2003
- Preceded by: Sir Louis Matheson
- Succeeded by: Philip Stagg

Director of Education, Papua New Guinea
- In office 1973 – 1980 (approx.)

Personal details
- Born: 14 February 1934 East New Britain Province, Papua New Guinea
- Died: 26 August 2003 (Aged 69)
- Spouse: Lady Nerrie Tololo
- Children: 3

Sir Alkan Tololo KBE (died 2003) was the director of Papua New Guinea's education department and the first Papua New Guinean to be chancellor of both the University of Papua New Guinea (UPNG) and the Papua New Guinea University of Technology (Unitech). He also became chancellor of Vudal University, as well as holding diplomatic posts in Australia and Malaysia.

== Early life ==
Alkan Tololo was a Tolai from the Kokopo area of what is now East New Britain Province in Papua New Guinea (PNG). He started out his working life as a primary school teacher in 1957.

== Career in education ==
Tololo worked his way up in the education system of the Territory of Papua and New Guinea and, when PNG became self-governing at the end of 1973, prior to independence in 1975, he became the director of education, a position he retained until the early 1980s. In 1975 he published the Handbook for Headmasters and Teachers in Secondary Schools in Papua New Guinea. Many Papua New Guineans, including Tololo, had been unhappy with the Australian colonial administration's approach to education. In 1974, he chaired a committee with an entirely Papua New Guinean membership, which drafted a post-independence five-year education plan. It placed emphasis on community-based schooling and the use of local languages, with education being more equally provided and with greater access to education for girls.

Tololo's views brought him into conflict with others, particularly the University of Papua New Guinea in Port Moresby. He was concerned to achieve a rapid growth in the number of teachers but was worried that the close relationship between the Goroka Teachers College (GTC) and UPNG was leading to the GTC adopting more of an academic approach to education, which would jeopardise the ability to increase the number of teachers quickly. University staff, however, were concerned that a proposal for GTC to offer a B.Ed. degree that required two years of in-service training would lead to a degree that would be thought to be inferior than that offered by the university. Tololo considered that the UPNG Faculty of Education was not needed. He also found himself in dispute with UPNG and Unitech in Lae over his proposals, supported by PNG's first prime minister, Michael Somare, and the country's National Planning Office, for the two universities to be merged. This merger was not achieved, but Tololo did become chancellor of both institutions in 1975, and their governing councils had several shared members. He continued to emphasise that the role of universities was to meet the trained-employee requirements of an independent nation.

Tololo also encountered a number of student demonstrations, where he expected the universities to do more to restrain their students. A particular concern was that of student demonstrations spilling over into the wider community and it was made clear by Tololo and the minister of education that protest would only be permitted on the campus. One cause of discontent was the continuing role of Queen Elizabeth II as Head of State of PNG. In February 1976, the Governor-General, Sir John Guise, the representative of the Queen, was drowned out by students while attempting to speak at UPNG.

== Diplomatic career ==
Around 1980, Tololo was made Consul-General of Papua New Guinea in Sydney, Australia. He then became the country's High Commissioner in the Australian capital, Canberra, before being transferred to Kuala Lumpur as High Commissioner to Malaysia.

== Other activities ==
Tololo later became chancellor of Vudal University, situated in his home province. He served as chair of the National Broadcasting Corporation of Papua New Guinea and of the National Agricultural Research Institute (NARI). An early pioneer of Savings and loan associations, he was a founder member of the East New Britain Savings and Loans Society, which started with 23 members and by the time of his death had 24,000.

== Death ==
Tololo died of an apparent heart attack, on 26 August 2003. At the time of his death he was still chancellor at Unitech and Vudal universities.

== Awards and honours ==
Tololo was made an Officer of the Order of the British Empire (OBE), a Commander of the same Order (CBE), and a Knight Commander of the Order (KBE).

Buildings were named after him at UPNG, PNG Unitech and at NARI. Unitech established a foundation in his honour, to provide fellowships for students.
