= Mary Kekedo =

Papua New Guinean educator

Mary Kekedo in 1973

Dame Mary Angela Kekedo DBE, BEM (née Natera; c. 1919 – 15 January 1993) was a Papuan educator.

Born on Yule Island she moved to Kokoda, after her husband found work there in the local government office. Keen to educate her children but with the district lacking a school she began to teach them herself. Her class soon grew to encompass many local villagers and, with Jessie Yeoman the wife of the assistant district officer, she established a school. Kekedo also taught modern health techniques to local women before becoming a child welfare officer. She was honoured by the award of the British Empire Medal and appointment as Commander, and then Dame Commander, of the Order of the British Empire.

== Educational work ==
Mary Angela Natera was born on Yule Island (which was then part of the Australian-administered Territory of Papua) around 1919. She attended St Patrick's Primary School. She married Walter Kekedo in 1939. Walter moved to Kokoda as a clerk and radio operator in the district office in 1947 and Mary joined him in 1948. The couple had ten children and also adopted an abandoned child left at their door. But there was no school in the district to educate them. Kekedo, who had had no advanced education, wanted them to receive a modern education. She began to teach her eldest son, Roland (who was then seven), and some of his friends in her house. She was assisted by her husband and Jessie Yeoman, the wife of the assistant district officer.

Kekedo visited local villages over four weeks to invite Orokaiva children to join her class but she was shocked when 200 turned up on the first day on 24 May 1948. The school had no buildings so the school was at first established in her home. The school quickly grew to 400 pupils and the children only spoke Motu which was a language that she did not speak. Each morning she would teach them to speak English.

Walter obtained land from the government and, with the help of villagers, built a two-shed school. For 13 months Kekedo and Yeoman taught an expanding group of children before the territory's Department of Education sent a trained teacher. The government took over the running of the school, sent more teachers and constructed more classrooms.

In addition to her school work Kekedo taught modern hygiene, post-natal care and midwifery techniques to local women. She joined the territory's Child Welfare Department and grew her practice into a vocational training centre.

== Honours and legacy ==
Kekedo received the British Empire Medal in the 1968 New Year Honours for her work as senior assistant at the Kokoda Primary 'T' School. She was appointed a Commander of the Order of the British Empire in the 1977 Silver Jubilee and Birthday Honours for services to the community. She was promoted to a Dame Commander in the same order in the 1987 New Year Honours. This last honour was awarded to Kekodo by Sir Alkan Tololo, Papua's education secretary, who commented that "this women never stops working".

Her daughter, Rose, was also created a Dame Commander of the Order of the British Empire in the 1995 Birthday Honours and they became the first mother and daughter dames in Papua. A second daughter, Jean Kekedo, was also appointed to the same honour in the 2020 Birthday Honours. Mary and her husband Walter brought up eleven children including one who was left outside their door when she was one month old.

Mary Kekedo died on 15 January 1993. Her funeral in Port Moresby was attended by more than 500 people. She was buried in Kokoda and a new school in Port Moresby was named in her honour. A Hall of Residence at the University of Papua New Guinea in Port Moresby was also named after her.
