= Penny Sage-embo =

- Occupation: Social entrepreneur

Penny Sage-embo (or Sagembo) is a social entrepreneur in Papua New Guinea. In 2014 she won the Trukai Community Responsibility Award in the Westpac Outstanding Women of the Year Awards.

In 2003 Sage-embo and her husband established Tembari Children’s Care in Oro, Port Moresby, which provides care for abandoned and orphaned children. Initially the organisation focused on caring for the orphans of HIV-positive parents, as both Penny and her husband Hayward worked as counsellors for people diagnosed with HIV and they were concerned for the future of their clients' children. In 2012 Tembari provided meals and education for 200 children, and in 2016 provided for 350 children. In 2015 government aid assisted the centre to build classrooms and provide education at their site, as bus fares and transport to nearby schools had become prohibitive.

In 2014 Sage-embo founded Joy’s Social Training Institute. It aims to empower and motivate women through awareness raising, counselling, formal supervision and focused training programs for businesses and the community.
