= Papua New Guinea University of Natural Resources and Environment =

Agriculture university

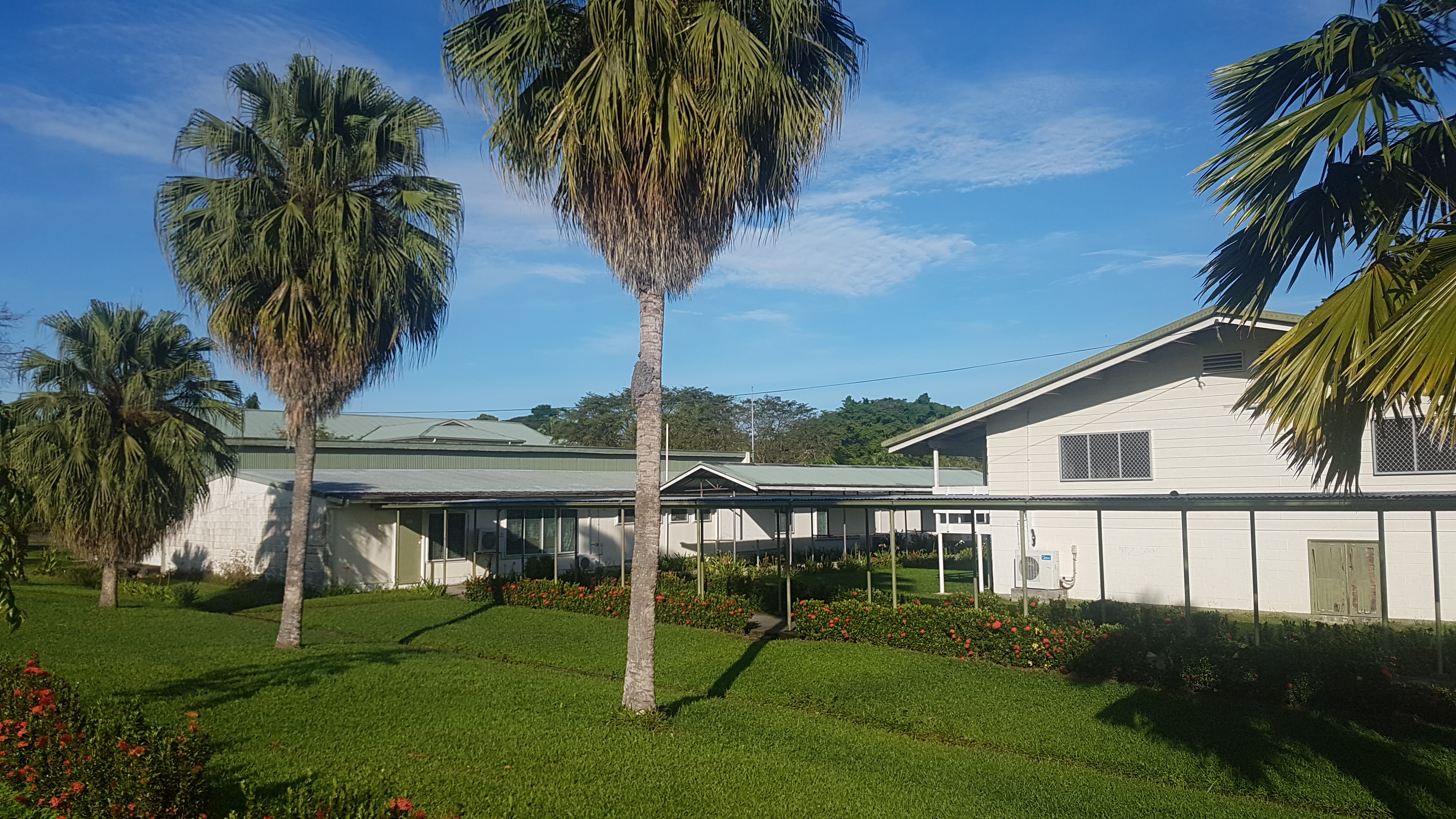
- View of the campus
- Type: Public University
- Established: May 15, 1965 (as a college of the then Department of Agriculture, Stock and Fisheries) by C.E. Barnes, Minister for Territories
- Chancellor: Dr John Mobis
- Vice-Chancellor: Dr Aisak G Pue
- Students: 750
- Location: Kerevat, East New Britain, Papua New Guinea; 4.35108°S 152.00918°E
- Affiliations: PNG UNRE Oro Campus (OC)
- Website: www.unre.ac.pg

Papua New Guinea University of Natural Resources and Environment (formerly known as the University of Vudal) is a university located in East New Britain Province, Papua New Guinea.

Research at the university addresses some of the problems faced by the agricultural, fisheries, forestry and tourism industries of Papua New Guinea.

== History ==
The university was established in 1965 as Vudal Agricultural College (VAC), a male only college of the then Department of Agriculture, Stock and Fisheries. The first female students were enrolled ten years later, in 1975. As such it can claim to be the oldest institution of tertiary education in PNG.

The college offered a two-year certificate and three-year diploma training in Tropical Agriculture, and made significant contributions to agricultural education and rural development in Papua New Guinea and neighbouring South Pacific countries.

In 1992, VAC was merged with Papua New Guinea University of Technology. Five years later, the college became University of Vudal, an autonomous higher education institution through an Act of Parliament that was passed in January 1997.

In 1999, under inaugural Vice Chancellor Professor Walter Wong, a four-year Bachelor of Tropical Agriculture degree programme was introduced and the certificate program was phased out.

In 2005, the University Council, under the chancellorship of former Prime Minister and present Governor of New Ireland, Sir Julius Chan, unanimously directed that the University change its name and begin the process of internationalising from a one-discipline university to a multi-disciplined one.

The school's name and logo were chosen from a public name and logo competition to promote a new training focus – "training in the sound management and harvesting of natural renewable resources". While the council endorsed these changes then, the Name Change Bill was passed in Parliament four years later, on May 13, 2009.

Following the resignation of Sir Julius as chancellor in 2007, another former prime minister, Sir Rabbie Namaliu, was endorsed by council as the university's third chancellor. Sir Rabbie, a distinguished statesman, served as chancellor until he resigned in January 2011. The university's first female chancellor, Margaret L. Elias, was appointed by council at the 50th Council meeting on September 30, 2011. The university's inaugural chancellor was the late Sir Alan Tololo. The chancellor of UNRE was Professor Kenneth Sumbuk, appointed in October 2017. However, he resigned from UNRE and moved to UPNG as VC in 2019 but his appointment was blocked following a staff protest.

== Courses ==
- Diploma / Advanced Diploma / Degree in Sustainable Tropical Agriculture
- Diploma / Advanced Diploma / Degree in Sustainable in Fisheries Marine Resource Management
- Diploma / Advanced Diploma / Degree in Sustainable Tropical Forestry
- Diploma / Advanced Diploma / Degree in Sustainable Livestock Production
- Diploma / Advanced Diploma / Degree in Sustainable International Tourism (from 2019)
- Masters Certificate / Masters in Management Studies
