= Joyce Kiage =

Joyce Kiage is a businesswoman from Papua New Guinea. In 2015 she won the Westpac Outstanding Women Entrepreneur Award. The Asia Pacific Economic Cooperation organization also recognized her as the First PGN Iconic Women winner in 2015.

== Life ==
Kiage is from Chimbu Province. She learnt to sew as an adult and opened a tailoring business providing sewing services and making uniforms for businesses. She has used part of the proceeds of her business to fund the building of a new church building in her home village.
