= Jean Kekedo =

Papua New Guinean administrator and diplomat

Dame Jean Kekedo DBE CSM DStJ
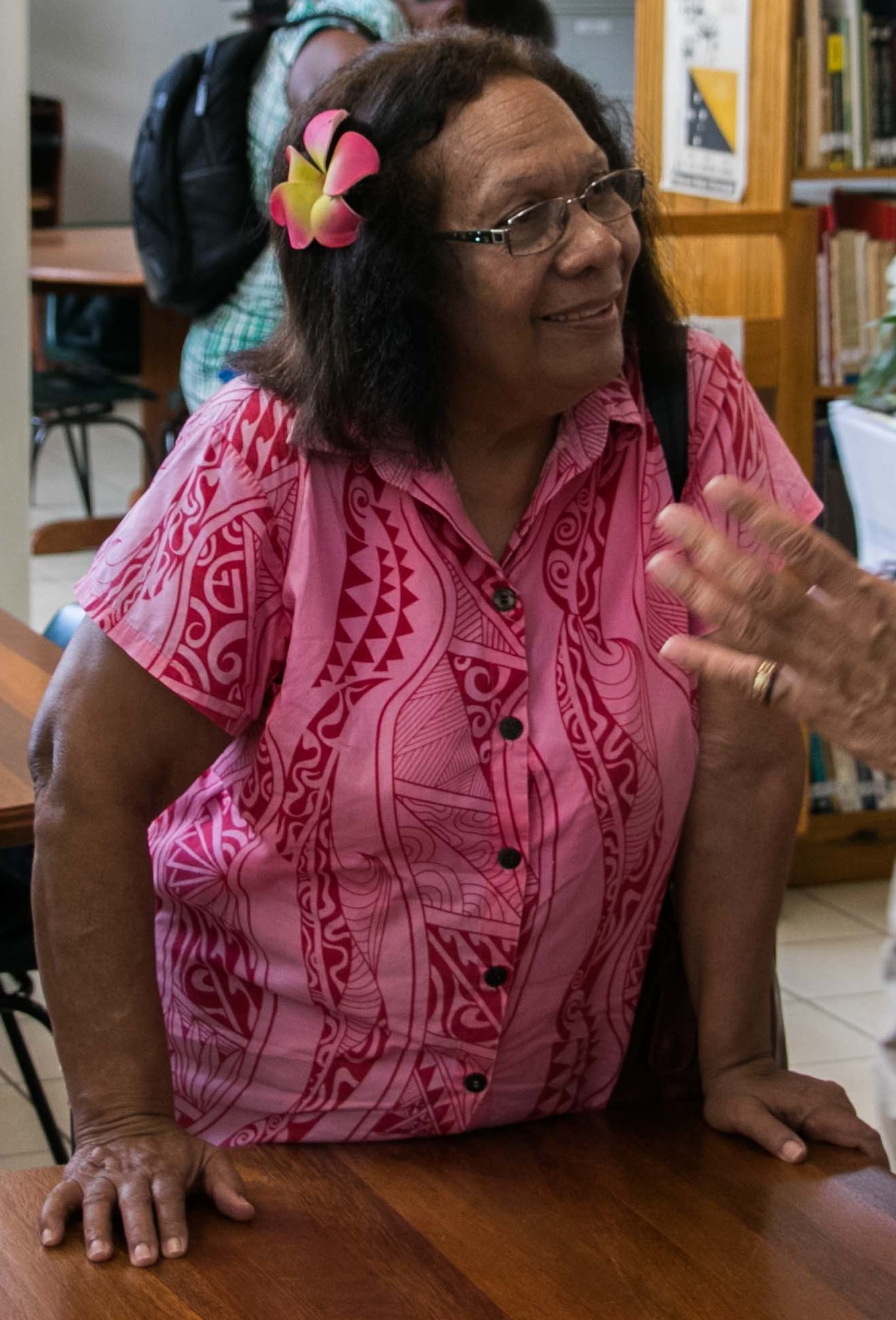
- Kekedo in 2017
- Born: Jean Lucilla Kekedo; Kokoda, Oro Province, Papua New Guinea
- Education: University of South Australia
- Occupations: Civil servant and diplomat
- Known for: High Commissioner to the United Kingdom

Dame Jean Lucilla Kekedo DBE CSM DStJ is a Papua New Guinean activist who has held senior roles in the country's public service, including that of Ombudsman and High commissioner to the United Kingdom.

== Early life ==
After World War II, Jean Lucilla Kekedo's parents moved from Central Province to Kokoda in what is now Oro Province, with her father, Walter, being given the responsibility to prepare Kokoda for the arrival of Australian officers. Her mother, Mary Kekedo, established a school there, which had 200 children. Kekedo attended this school and later went to school in the provincial capital of Popondetta, where the students had to grow much of their own food. Like her two elder sisters, she won a scholarship to study in Australia, but turned this down in order to go to Rabaul High School in East New Britain. On leaving high school she was offered a scholarship to attend the University of Papua New Guinea but declined as she wanted to be a patrol officer or work in agriculture, both of which were barred to women.

In 1965, she was posted to Milne Bay Province as a welfare officer. There she worked with Alice Wedega (later Dame Alice Wedega), the first Papua New Guinean woman to sit in the Legislative Council of Papua and New Guinea. In 1968, Jean Kekedo was transferred back to Popondetta, where she was finally persuaded to go to university. Starting out her undergraduate studies at the University of Papua New Guinea in Port Moresby, she completed her degree at the South Australian Institute of Technology, now the University of South Australia.

== Career ==
At the time Kekedo graduated, before Papua New Guinea's Independence in 1975, there was a strong demand for new graduates to fill relatively senior positions. In 1973 she was appointed as head of Village Development and within six months she was made deputy head of the Prime Minister's Department, as a result of which she spent two months in Canberra after PNG's Independence, training with the Australian administration that supported the cabinet of prime minister Malcolm Fraser.

In 1982, Kekedo became Papua New Guinea's ombudsman. In 1986, she declined the opportunity to serve a second term in this position because of the threats she was receiving. Intending to take a break from being a civil servant, she was then appointed by the minister, Nahau Rooney, without her knowledge, to be Secretary for Civil Aviation. Apparently, the decision was taken because Kekedo had a pilot's licence. Later, Kekedo became head of the Forestry Department, another position with which she found difficulties, because of corruption. In 2002 she was appointed PNG's High commissioner in London. According to her she would have preferred the vacant job as High commissioner to Fiji but the prime minister, Mekere Morauta, decided to send her to London after talking to her children. Her two sons expressed a preference for London because they wanted to see Manchester United play.

Since returning from London, Kekedo has held a variety of positions, both official and charitable. She was a member of the Council of the Papua New Guinea University of Technology from 2013 and appointed chancellor of that university in 2017. In 2021, she was made chair of the Royal Papua New Guinea Constabulary police promotion and selection board, the first woman to hold this position. She is also chair of St. John Ambulance, a statutory charity.

== Awards and honours ==
Kekedo was made a Dame Commander of the Order of the British Empire in the 2020 Birthday Honours. She became the third member of her family to be honoured in this way, after her mother, Dame Mary Kekedo, and her elder sister, Dame Rosalina Kekedo. In March 2026, it was announced that she had also been made a Dame Commander of the Order of St John (DStJ).
