= Papua New Guinea Institute of Medical Research =

Papua New Guinea research institute

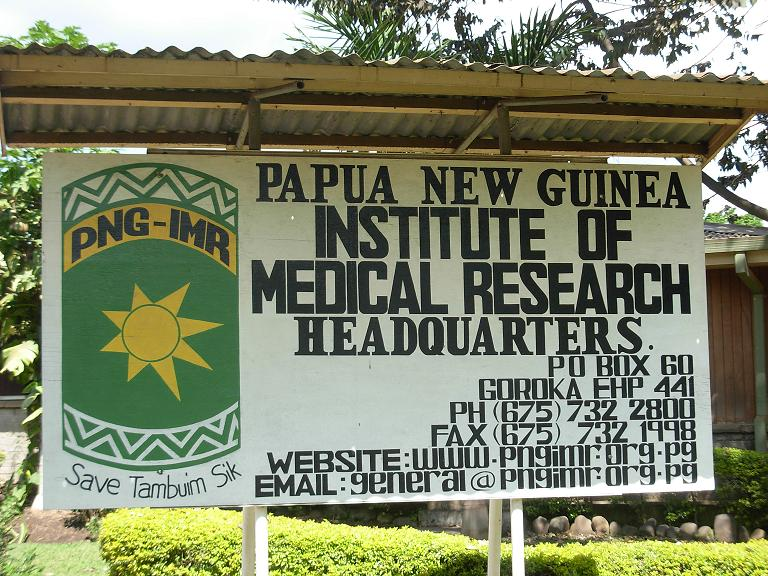
- Signboard at IMR Goroka
- Established: 1968

The Papua New Guinea Institute of Medical Research (PNG IMR) is the principal institution conducting health research in Papua New Guinea with a focus on health problems affecting the country's population.

== History ==
The Papua New Guinea Institute of Medical Research is a statutory body of the Government of Papua New Guinea (PNG). The Institute was established in 1968 through an Act of Parliament and it effectively acts as the research arm of the PNG Department of Health. The ultimate aim of all the Institute's research activities is to provide effective interventions, leading to improvements in people's health and the control and prevention of disease. The basis for achieving this aim is greater understanding of the disease process and constraints to change. In part, this understanding comes from knowledge of the external causative agents of disease and in part from examining the host factors involved.

Early work of the institute focused on respiratory diseases, pigbel (clostridial necrotizing enteritis), and kuru. Since then, major research programs have been established in respiratory diseases, malaria, malnutrition, enteric diseases, sexual health, women's health, and others.

The Institute's second director (1977-2000) was Professor Michael Alpers, an Australian medical researcher who was instrumental in the discovery of the epidemiology and transmission of kuru.

== Organization and Activities ==
The Papua New Guinea Institute of Medical Research has its headquarters with offices and laboratories in Goroka, Eastern Highlands Province. The headquarters also house the Michael Alpers Library and the Adolf Saweri Lecture Theatre. Another major branch is located at Yagaum, near the coastal town of Madang. The Institute has smaller branches and offices in Maprik and Wewak (East Sepik Province), and in the capital Port Moresby. Research activities are carried out in several additional field sites across the country, including Alotau (Milne Bay), Karkar Island (Madang) and Hides (Southern Highlands).

The PNG IMR is organized in an administrative and support services section and four scientific units:

- Vector Borne Disease Unit

The unit focuses on research into malaria and lymphatic filariasis. Most activities are concentrated in the branches in Madang and Maprik. The unit includes molecular and immunological laboratories, a large research microscopy section, and an entomology laboratory. The unit also conducts clinical trials with antimalarial drugs.

- Infection and Immunity Unit

The unit conducts research into enteric diseases, including cholera, and respiratory diseases including pneumonia and tuberculosis. The unit also conducts continuous surveillance of suspected cases of kuru.

- Population Health and Demography Unit

This unit emerged in 2011 from the former Operational Research Unit. The PHDU focuses on assessing large-scale trends in health and disease by applying an interdisciplinary population-based research approach. The unit’s current emphasis is on the evaluation of large-scale health interventions implemented at national or sub-national levels and the assessment of changes in health trends related to large-scale development projects. The PHDU’s mission is to conduct policy-relevant interdisciplinary research with the aim to understand population-level changes and determinants of health and disease in Papua New Guinea. In consideration of changes in disease patterns related to social and economical developments, the PHDU is planning to expand into the areas of Non Communicable Diseases and Cancers as well as Health Systems Research and Health Economics.

- Sexual and Reproductive Health Unit

This is the second unit that emerged from the previous Operational Research Unit. It conducts clinical, laboratory and social research into sexually transmitted infections including HIV/AIDS, and other sexual and reproductive health issues.

- Environmental and Emerging Diseases Unit

The most recently established unit deals with environmental pathogens and infectious diseases that have recently been emerging in PNG, such as cholera and influenza.

Research at IMR is interdisciplinary and often translational. Scientific disciplines represented at the institute include epidemiology, microbiology, immunology, entomology, medical anthropology, molecular genetics, biostatistics, public health, and demography.

The IMR headquarters in Goroka also houses the editorial office of the Papua New Guinea Medical Journal, a peer-reviewed scientific periodical published by the Medical Society of PNG. Electronic versions of the journal's publications can be obtained for many editions through the website of the institute.

== Research & Funding ==
The institute receives core funding from the Government of Papua New Guinea and from AusAID. While both the government and AusAID contribute to research studies, most research grants are competitively acquired from overseas funding agencies and additional studies are conducted as contract research. Thanks to the IMR's successful history and its extensive network of international collaborators, the institute has been able to secure research grants and contracts from major donor agencies, including the Bill & Melinda Gates Foundation, the Australian National Health and Medical Research Council, the U.S. National Institutes of Health (NIH), the Global Fund to Fight AIDS, Tuberculosis and Malaria, the World Health Organization, the Swiss National Science Foundation, and several others. In the last two years, the PNG Liquified Natural Gas (PNG LNG) project has been providing infrastructural and research support through IMR's engagement in the health impact assessment of this large development project.
