= Mazzella Maniwavie =

Mangrove scientist and climate activist from Papua New Guinea

- Born: 1987 (age 38–39)
- Occupations: Mangrove scientist and climate activist
- Employer: The Nature Conservancy

Mazzella Maniwavie (born 1987) is a mangrove scientist and climate change activist from Papua New Guinea.

== Career ==
Maniwavie links threats to mangroves to climate change and the maintenance of Papua New Guinea's culture, saying:

Our greatest challenge in the Pacific is climate change. If we do not use our mangroves wisely, we will have no defence against climate change impacts, and we will end up losing our way of life and our identities.

Maniwavie first worked in mangrove conservation as a volunteer at Motupore Island Research Centre. She attended the University of Papua New Guinea, studying general biology and marine biology. After university, she worked for the Wildlife Conservation Society, running community trainings on mangrove restoration.

In 2014, Maniwavie received the IBMM Young Achiever's Westpac Outstanding Women Award for her contributions to mangrove conservation.

She is the author of Community-based Mangrove Planting Handbook: A step-by-step guide to implementing a mangrove rehabilitation project for the coastal communities of Papua New Guinea, published in June 2014.

In 2018, Maniwavie earned a master's degree in marine biology and ecology from James Cook University in North Queensland, Australia. She then worked for The Nature Conservancy assessing mangrove forests and training communities on their restoration in Milne Bay Province, Papua New Guinea.

As of 2020, Maniwavie worked as a scientist for the Mangoro Market Meri program, which supports sustainable mangrove management, at The Nature Conservancy. As part of that work, she works to create mangrove protection legislation and promotes the blue carbon benefits of wetlands.

== Personal life ==
Maniwavie is married and has a daughter.

Maniwavie was born in 1987, and grew up in Bootless Bay, Papua New Guinea. She has two siblings. As a child, Maniwavie observed the disappearance of mangroves from communities near her home in Papua New Guinea. Maniwavie's father, Thomas Maniwavie, was a marine biologist whose profession inspired her career choice.

Maniwavie is described as Papua New Guinea's first female mangrove scientist. She has noted the challenges faced by women scientists in Papua New Guinea, and has spoken about her hope of serving as a role model for young women in her country.
