= Pepetua Serero =

Bougainvillean activist

Perpetua Serero (died June 14 1989) was a Bougainvillean activist.

Serero was raised in Guava village on Bougainville, and attended Catholic mission schools run by the Marist Order. She later worked as a broadcast officer for the Bougainville radio station of the Australian colonial administration. In August 1987, along with her cousin Francis Ona, she held a meeting of landowners surrounding the Panguna mine and formed a new, younger and more radical executive of the Panguna Landowners Association, with Serero as chairperson (chairlady) and Ona as general secretary. She was an outspoken advocate for the rights of local landowners and against the environmental damage caused by the mine.

Serero had been ill from the beginning of the crisis that was to become the Bougainville Civil War, and died from an asthma attack in June 1989, only months after the conflict over the mine had turned into a fight over Bougainvillean secession. Her cousin and colleague in the Panguna Landowners' Association leadership, Ona, would go on to lead the Bougainville Revolutionary Army in the war.
