= Alice Wedega =

Papuan politician (1905–1987)

Dame Alice Wedega
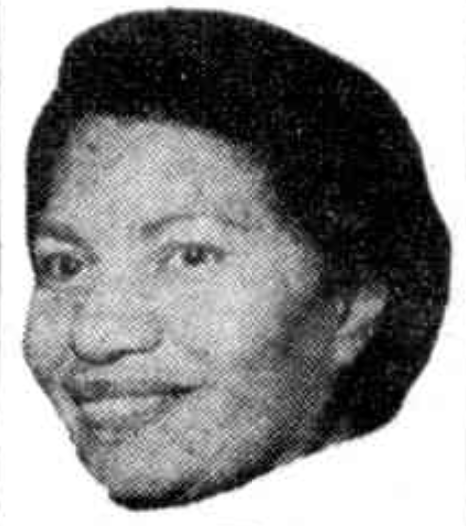
- Alice Wedega, Papuan teacher, c. 1952
- Born: 20 August 1905; Milne Bay district, Papua New Guinea
- Died: 3 December 1987 (aged 82); Ahioma, Papua New Guinea
- Occupations: Missionary, teacher, welfare officer, legislator
- Known for: First indigenous woman to serve on Papua New Guinea's national Legislative Council
- Notable work: Listen My Country
- Awards: Dame Commander of the Order of the British Empire

Dame Alice Wedega, DBE (20 August 1905 – 3 December 1987) was a Papuan politician, educator, peacemaker and conscientious objector.

== Biography ==
Born in Ahioma in Milne Bay, Wedega was raised in Kwato. She worked to educate her people and evangelise Christianity, and helped foster peace by "making enemies into friends" derived from her own education by Charles Abel, a missionary who established a school on the island of Kwato.

She served as a welfare office with the department of Native Affairs, and established a school for domestic science in Milne Bay. Wedega was also active in the Girl guides movement, and became the first national Girl Guide Commissioner in Papua New Guinea. She was appointed to the Legislative Council of Papua and New Guinea in 1961, the first indigenous woman to sit in the legislature. She served until 1963.

In 1981, she published her autobiography, Listen My Country, which focuses on "her experiences as a Christian and as a woman." She is considered to be the first woman from Papua New Guinea to publish a book, and her autobiography was reprinted in 2016. She travelled internationally to conferences, representing her country, and to Northern Ireland to help build peace.

== Quotes ==
- "... [o]ur people used to kill and eat men. They would practice payback. That is, if one of your side killed one of mine, my side would kill one of yours. But the missionaries came from Europe to stop us doing all that. And now I have been back to Northern Ireland to help the Europeans there stop doing it." (A. Wedega)
- "...we women of Papua can be a strong force to make this country a better country than it is today."

== Legacy and honours ==
On 13 June 1964, Wedega was appointed a Member of the Order of the British Empire, in recognition of her service to her community. Wedega was elevated to Dame Commander of the Order of the British Empire in June 1983, as part of the Queen's birthday honours. She was the first woman from Papua New Guinea to be made a Dame.

In 2002, Eric Johns wrote a biography of Wedega, written for secondary students.

== Works ==
- Listen My Country (2016) ISBN 9789980891808, 9980891807
