= Cybele Druma =

Introduced women's rugby union to Papua New Guinea

- Born: abt 1970; Papua New Guinea
- Occupation: rugby player

Cybele Druma is a rugby player and women's sports activist in Papua New Guinea. She is responsible for introducing women's rugby to the country, fighting deep societal resistance to women in sports. Druma was head of the Papua New Guinea Rugby Football Union, the national rugby organization; she is one of the only females in the world to have presided over a national rugby federation. She is also president of the new Papua New Guinea Women Rugby Union Board a role to which she was elected for consecutive terms in 2007 and 2009. In 2018 she became the president of Port Moresby's National Capital District Rugby Union.

She has been recognized internationally for her work, and is involved in promoting women's opportunities in rugby worldwide.

== Introduction of women's rugby ==
Although the Papua New Guinea Rugby Football Union was founded in 1963, followed by PNG joining World Rugby in 1993, it took until 2006 for women's rugby to begin in the country. Druma was at the forefront of the movement to introduce the sport for women; she organized the Women's Rugby Union, uniting over three hundred women to make it happen, so there would be opportunities for women to play. Although there were almost one thousand female players in Port Moresby soon after the game was introduced, players dropped off rapidly but has experienced a resurgence.

== Rookie Sevens tournament ==
Another event Druma founded in 2006 to support women's rugby is the "Rookie Sevens" tournament, originally for women and juniors who wanted to play seven-a-side rugby. That first tournament had 16 teams participating, whereas by 2019 the tournament had four divisions with a total of 60 participating teams. She had been expecting about 120 teams in 2020, before the COVID-19 pandemic hit.

== PNG on the international stage ==
Druma coached the women's team onto the world stage quite rapidly, competing in the Darwin Hottest Sevens tournament in 2006 and at the Hong Kong Sevens tournament in 2007.

When she first founded the women's union, she saw much potential in the women of PNG. Druma predicted that it would take fewer years for them to rise to participating in the Rugby World Cup than it would take the PNG men's team to do the same. In 2018, both the men's and women's teams qualified, making it a fifty-five year journey for the men's team, but only a twelve-year journey for the women.

== Awards ==
In 2017–2018, Druma was the Moore Printing Sports Award finalist in the Westpac Outstanding Women Awards.

Then, she was one of 14 women, selected from among 100 applicants, to receive the World Rugby Women's Executive Leadership Scholarship in 2019. She used some of her £10,000 prize to attend the first ever Oceania Rugby Women's Leadership Workshop in Fiji, along with completing the online Women in Leadership Certificate from Cornell University.

== Cultural impact ==
Druma is such a notable figure in PNG that the Department of Education's 2009 civics curriculum mentions her in their lesson "Is She a Leader?" when they ask the teacher to explain: “We can easily recognize leaders like the captain of the national rugby team, simply because people take their picture and they are always in the news. However, there are also many much less visible leaders who do less exciting but often more important jobs.”
