= Pallas-class frigate =

Two classes of frigate have been named the Pallas class:

- Pallas-class frigate (1791), a class of three British warships designed in 1791
- Pallas-class frigate (1808), a class of fifty-seven French warships designed in 1805
