= Allison Sudradjat =

Australian public servant

Allison Sudradjat was AusAID's Minister Counsellor in Indonesia.

== Early life and career ==
Sudradjat was born in Narrogin, Western Australia, in 1966 to Kevin and Elaine Keevil. She was awarded a scholarship to Perth College, where she studied Indonesian, before winning an undergraduate scholarship to the Australian National University (ANU) in 1983. At ANU she undertook a degree in Asian Studies, completing her Honours year in 1986 after majoring in Indonesian and history.

Sudradjat worked at the Indonesian embassy prior to traveling to Bandung, Indonesia, to undertake a university scholarship at Padjadjaran University awarded by the Indonesian Government.

Sudradjat began work at AusAID in 1989 and served in overseas postings in Indonesia and Papua New Guinea. While in Papua New Guinea, Sudradjat managed the AusAID assistance during the 1997-98 drought, and was involved in the aftermath of the 1998 tsunami that hit the Aitape region.

She coordinated for AusAID the 2004 Boxing Day tsunami emergency relief effort provided by the Australian Government, and served as AusAID's foreign affairs representative in Indonesia. Later, in 2005, Sudradjat was appointed to the role of minister-counsellor.

== Personal life, death and legacy ==
At the Indonesian embassy in Canberra Sudradjat met her future husband, Ris, whom she married in Jakarta in 1988. She had four children.

Sudradjat died in the crash of Garuda Indonesia Flight 200 on 7 March 2007.

In the AusAID magazine Focus, Alexander Downer, then Australia's Minister of Foreign Affairs, said of Sudradjat:

She was an exceptional human being who cared passionately for the aid program and what it can achieve. Allison coordinated the Australian Government's emergency response in Indonesia after the Indian Ocean tsunami, headed the reconstruction program in Aceh and later took over as head of all AusAID programs in Indonesia. She had enormous capacity and talent.

On 18 March 2008, Stephen Smith, Australia's Minister for Foreign Affairs, announced the inaugural winners of the Allison Sudradjat Scholarships, awarded to six scholars who undertake master's or PhD level courses, and include four from Indonesia and two from Papua New Guinea.
