= Cybele Rowe =

Australian ceramic artist

- Born: Cybele Rowe; 1963 (age 62–63); Sydney, Australia
- Education: Bachelor of Fine Arts in Fine Art
- Alma mater: UNSW Art & Design
- Occupations: ceramics artist, sculptor
- Years active: 1986—present
- Website: cybeleroweart.com

Cybele Rowe (born 1963 in Sydney, Australia), is an Australian ceramic artist based in Yucca Valley, California, United States.

She is known for monumental ceramic sculptures and has been actively exhibiting in the United States and Australia for nearly 30 years.

== Life and career ==
Cybele Rowe was born in 1963 in Sydney, Australia. She attended high school at Loreto Convent Kirribilli in Sydney, and received her Bachelor of The Arts in Fine Arts as well as a postgraduate degree at the City Art Institute University in New South Wales.

Following her graduate work, Rowe attracted the attention of the International Council of the Museum of Modern Art, and the Australian Council offered her a grant to study abroad and further develop her work in New York City. She moved to New York in 1990, where she maintained a studio in Upper East Side until relocating to Silverado in 1998. In 2016, she moved to her current residence in Yucca Valley, California.

Rowe actively exhibited in galleries in Australia including the Blaxland Gallery in Sydney and the Distelfink Gallery in Melbourne before she relocated to New York Cit; while there, her work has been displayed in the World Bank, the Kennedy Center, and the Smithsonian.

The 2018 Los Angeles Art Show and The Palm Springs Art Show saw her monumental sculptures as centerpieces, and she was named among the "Most Influential People" by the Orange County Weekly Magazine in 2015.

Rowe has taught sculpture and art during the course of her career. She taught elementary school aged children in an after school enrichment program titled “The Great Clay Adventure.” More recently, in 2013, she was the artist in residence and the head teacher at the National Art School in Sydney, Australia, teaching a class titled “Building Big with Cybele,” and also taught a Saddleback College course titled “Art Survival.”

== Sculpture ==
Much of Rowe’s art is monumental bronze casts, clay sculpture and ceramic work. Highly abstract with flowing patterns and colors, she states that she desires to create “organically and intuitively,” giving abstract thoughts and concepts physical forms while “constructing a unique model through almost subconscious anticipation.”

A large body of her work is dedicated to the conception of womanhood and the female experience. These series were titled Vessels, Pleasing Female Imagery, Femelements, Big Girls, Squat Girls, Fertility and Husks. Pleasing Female Imagery, Human Shells as Temples and Femelements were created in the three years after the birth of her first son, reestablishing her identity as an artist and sculptor; Fertility was finished after the birth of her daughter; a series of sculptures considered the essence emotions such as love and desire. Husks, a series of large, off white ceramic sculptures pockmarked with scratches and etchings, questions the identity of womanhood after childbirth.
