= Bundi Rural LLG =

Local-level government in Papua New Guinea

- Location within Papua New Guinea
- Coordinates: 5.747503°S 145.235028°E
- Country: Papua New Guinea
- Province: Madang Province
- District: Usino Bundi District

Area
  - Total: 2,344 km^{2} (905 sq mi)

Population (2021 Estimate)
  - Total: 26,524
  - Density: 11.32/km^{2} (29.31/sq mi)
- Time zone: UTC+10 (AEST)

Bundi Rural LLG is a local-level government (LLG) of Madang Province, Papua New Guinea.

== Wards ==
- 01. Bundi-kara
- 02. Snopass
- 03. Bononi
- 04. Imuri
- 05. Gobug-Agu
- 06. Yandara
- 07. Kindaukevi
- 08. Karamuke
- 09. Marum
- 10. Mokinangi
- 11. Guyebi
- 12. Emegari
- 13. Kobum
- 14. Mondinongra
- 15. Pupuneri
- 16. Biom
- 17. Promisi
- 18. Brahman
- 19. Tauya
- 20. Safi
- 21. Pendiva
- 22. Krumbukari

== Climate ==
Bundi has a tropical rainforest climate (Af) with heavy rainfall year-round.

Climate data for Bundi
Month	Jan	Feb	Mar	Apr	May	Jun	Jul	Aug	Sep	Oct	Nov	Dec	Year
Mean daily maximum °C (°F)	26.7 (80.1)	26.9 (80.4)	26.5 (79.7)	26.7 (80.1)	26.6 (79.9)	26.1 (79.0)	25.7 (78.3)	26.1 (79.0)	26.5 (79.7)	26.7 (80.1)	27.3 (81.1)	26.8 (80.2)	26.6 (79.8)
Daily mean °C (°F)	21.3 (70.3)	21.5 (70.7)	21.2 (70.2)	21.3 (70.3)	21.2 (70.2)	20.5 (68.9)	20.2 (68.4)	20.4 (68.7)	20.7 (69.3)	20.9 (69.6)	21.2 (70.2)	21.4 (70.5)	21.0 (69.8)
Mean daily minimum °C (°F)	16.0 (60.8)	16.2 (61.2)	16.0 (60.8)	15.9 (60.6)	15.9 (60.6)	15.0 (59.0)	14.8 (58.6)	14.8 (58.6)	15.0 (59.0)	15.2 (59.4)	15.1 (59.2)	16.0 (60.8)	15.5 (59.9)
Average precipitation mm (inches)	316 (12.4)	337 (13.3)	332 (13.1)	277 (10.9)	209 (8.2)	133 (5.2)	114 (4.5)	127 (5.0)	188 (7.4)	243 (9.6)	253 (10.0)	298 (11.7)	2,827 (111.3)
Source: Climate-Data.org
