= Goroka =

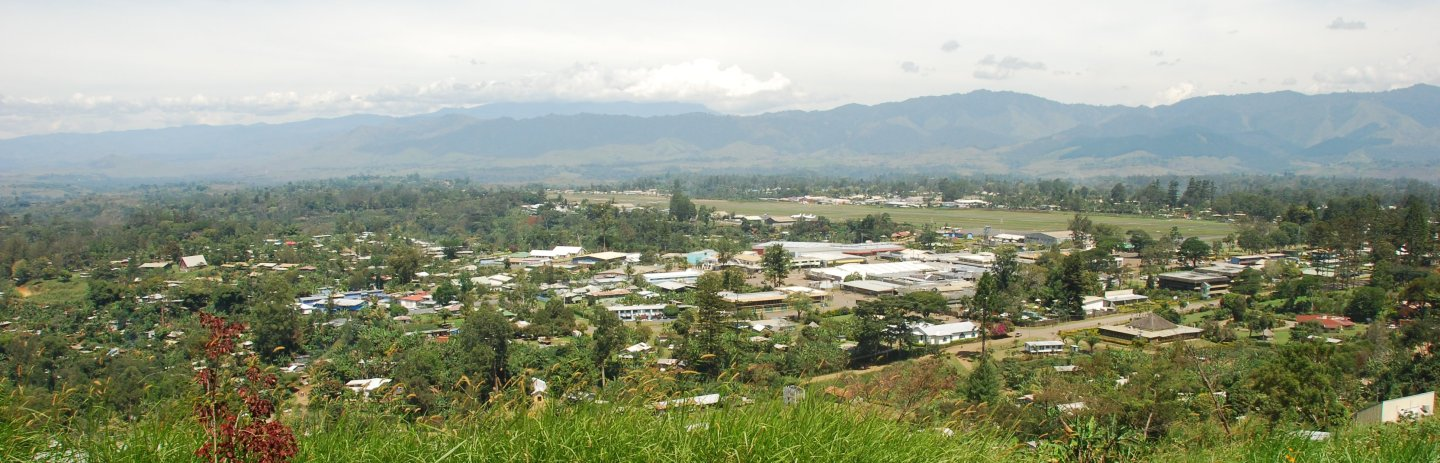
- Goroka from Mount Sitani (Mt. Kiss)

- Location within Papua New Guinea
- Coordinates: 6°05′S 145°23′E
- Country: Papua New Guinea
- Province: Eastern Highlands
- District: Goroka District
- LLG: Goroka Urban LLG
- Elevation: 1,546 m (5,072 ft)

Population
  - Total: 29,333
  - Rank: 6th
- Time zone: UTC+10 (AEST)
- Postcode: 441
- Location: 423 km (263 mi) from Port Moresby
- Climate: Am/Cfb

Goroka is the capital of the Eastern Highlands Province of Papua New Guinea. It is a town of approximately 29,333 people (2021), 1,600 meters (5,200 feet) above sea level. It has an airport (in the centre of town) and is on the "Highlands Highway", about 285 km (177 mi) from Lae in Morobe province and 90 km (56 mi) from the nearby town of Kainantu also in the Eastern Highlands. Other nearby towns include Kundiawa in Simbu Province and Mount Hagen in Western Highlands Province. It has a mild climate, known as a "perpetual Spring".

It is the home of several national institutions: CRMF Christian Radio Missionary Fellowship, the PNG Institute of Medical Research, the National Film Institute, the Liturgical Catechetical Institute, the Melanesian Institute, the Raun Raun Theatre Company and the University of Goroka. Several NGOs also have presences there, including Oxfam and Save the Children. The town's largest hotel is the Bird of Paradise, owned by the Coral Seas Hotels chain, with several mid-sized motels and numerous smaller accommodation providers also operating.

As the provincial seat for the Eastern Highlands Province, Goroka provides several services such as the provincial court, the provincial Department of Motor Vehicles, and numerous major chain stores. Goroka, similar to Mount Hagen and Lae, is home to a developing middle class and presents a unique blend of urban and rural life. Many residents of the town and its suburbs (known as the "blocks") have migrated to the region in search of jobs and a better quality of life.

Coffee is a common cash crop in the area; smaller industries include trout farms, pigs, bee keeping and food gardens (broccoli, kau kau or sweet potato, carrots, ginger and peanuts are examples of produce that grow well here; nearby Bena Bena is known for its pineapples). Goroka is also widely known for its bilum market.

== History ==
In May, Goroka hosts the PNG Coffee Festival. The festival features coffee tastings, barista competitions, and cultural performances.

The Goroka Show event takes place annually around the time of the country's Independence Day (September 16). It continues for two or three days. The Goroka Show began in 1956 and is the oldest show in Papua New Guinea.

== Climate ==
Goroka has a tropical monsoon climate (Köppen: Am). It features warm to very warm afternoons and cool to mild mornings year-round, with heavy rainfall most of the year and low rainfall from June to September.

Climate data for Goroka (1999–2007)
Month	Jan	Feb	Mar	Apr	May	Jun	Jul	Aug	Sep	Oct	Nov	Dec	Year
Mean daily maximum °C (°F)	26.7 (80.1)	26.5 (79.7)	26.5 (79.7)	26.9 (80.4)	26.3 (79.3)	26.1 (79.0)	25.6 (78.1)	26.0 (78.8)	26.2 (79.2)	27.0 (80.6)	27.0 (80.6)	27.5 (81.5)	26.5 (79.8)
Mean daily minimum °C (°F)	15.5 (59.9)	16.2 (61.2)	16.2 (61.2)	15.7 (60.3)	15.4 (59.7)	15.1 (59.2)	14.9 (58.8)	14.9 (58.8)	15.6 (60.1)	15.4 (59.7)	15.7 (60.3)	16.1 (61.0)	15.6 (60.0)
Average rainfall mm (inches)	153.4 (6.04)	214.5 (8.44)	272.2 (10.72)	175.7 (6.92)	151.9 (5.98)	43.8 (1.72)	70.4 (2.77)	49.2 (1.94)	150.1 (5.91)	132.1 (5.20)	145.4 (5.72)	163.8 (6.45)	1,722.5 (67.81)
Average rainy days	21	21	24	17	16	10	13	12	17	17	18	17	203
Source: World Meteorological Organization

== Notable people ==
- Former Premier of Tasmania Lara Giddings
- Rugby league players Stanley Gene and James Segeyaro.
- FIFA international soccer referee David Yareboinen.

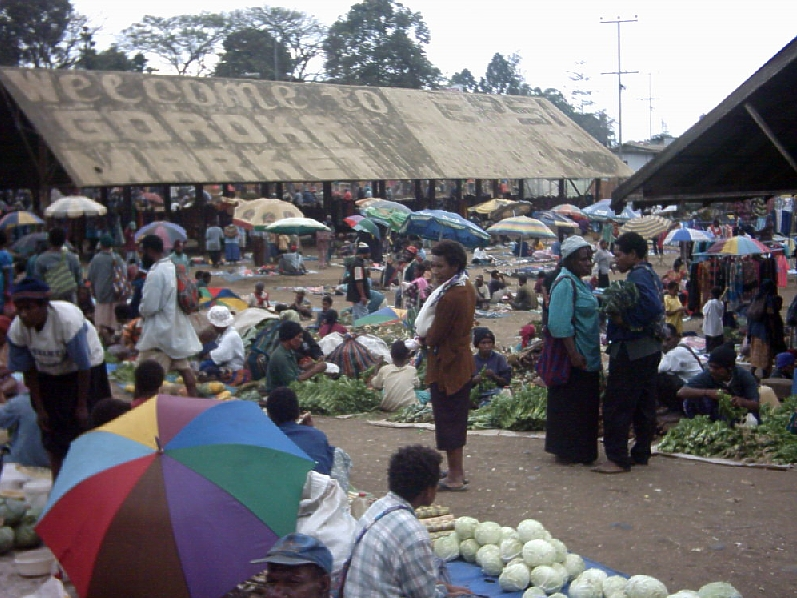
Old Goroka market

== See also ==
- Goroka Urban LLG
- Goroka District
- Goroka languages
