= Papua New Guinea University of Technology =

University in Papua New Guinea

Coordinates: 6.670°S 146.995°E

Papua New Guinea University of Technology (Unitech)
- Type: Public
- Established: 1965
- Affiliations: Association of Commonwealth Universities
- Chancellor: Jean Kekedo
- Vice-Chancellor: Ora Renagi
- Academic staff: 1,577 (including technical and administrative)
- Students: 3,500
- Location: Lae, Morobe, Papua New Guinea
- Campus: East Taraka, Bulolo and Kundiawa
- Website: www.unitech.ac.pg

The Unitech Kopi Haus (coffee house)

The Papua New Guinea University of Technology (Unitech) is a university located in Lae, Morobe Province of Papua New Guinea.

== Courses offered ==
Unitech offers courses in the following fields:

- Agriculture
- Architecture
- Construction Management (Previously Building in 2019 and back)
- Applied Sciences
  - Chemistry
  - Food Technology
  - Physics
- Business Studies
  - Accountancy
  - Management
  - Economics
  - Information Technology
- Communication for Development Studies
- Computer Science
- Engineering
  - Civil
  - Communications
  - Electrical

There are two bachelor's degree's offered by the Electrical Engineering department. The Communications Engineering and Electrical Engineering. Student's specialise in their chosen field during the final year of studies. This is a four year course.

  - Mechanical
  - Mining
- Forestry
- Forestry has both a 2-year diploma program and a 4-year degree program. Students undertaking bachelor of science in forestry usually do their first year at the main campus (Taraka), second and third years at Bulolo Forestry College (with the diploma students) and then final year back at the main campus.
- Mathematics
- Surveying

== See also ==
- List of forestry universities and colleges
- Unitech F.C.
