= East New Britain languages =

Language family of Papua New Guinea

East New Britain
- Geographic distribution: Gazelle Peninsula, New Britain
- Ethnicity: Baining people
- Linguistic classification: One of the world's primary language families
- Subdivisions: Baining; Taulil–Butam

Language codes
- Glottolog: None

The East New Britain languages are a possible small language family spoken on the Gazelle Peninsula of New Britain in Papua New Guinea. They were classified as East Papuan languages by Wurm, but this does not now seem tenable. The only comparative work that has been done between the two branches of the proposed family is Ross (2001), which shows similarities in the pronouns.

== Languages ==
The languages are:

- Baining: Mali, Qaqet, Kairak, Simbali, Ura, ?Makolkol (extinct?)
- Taulil–Butam: Taulil, Butam (extinct)

Makolkol is unattested.

Glottolog does not accept that a connection between the two branches has been demonstrated. Stebbins et al. (2018) note that further work needs to be done, and are uncertain how to explain the similarity in pronouns between the two families with the fact that the ancestors of the Taulil and Butam people had migrated from New Ireland and so presumably would have their closest relatives there.

== Pronouns ==
The pronouns Ross (2001) compares for East New Britain are as follows.

			1SG	2SG	3MSG	3FSG	1PL	2PL	3PL	1DU	2DU	3DU
proto-ENB			*ŋ(u)a	*ŋi(a)	*a	*E	*(d)udu	*ŋan(i)	*ta	*Nun	*(y)u	*i
Baining	free		ŋua	ŋia	ka	ki	uut	ŋen	ta~ra	uun	uin	ian~iam
Baining	POSS		gua	gia	aa							
Taulil	free	SBJ	ŋa	ŋi	aa	e	daa	yaa	taa	ŋu	yu	i~ip (3MDU), vitam (3FDU)
Taulil	free	OBJ	ŋaaŋ	ŋiŋ	aa	e	undu	ŋan	taa	ŋun	yu	ip (3MDU), vitam (3FDU)
Taulil	POSS		ŋa	ŋi	vaa	ve	du	ina	ina~ta	ŋunu	yu	ip (3MDU), ito (3FDU)
Butam	free		ŋa	ŋi	a	e	ur	ŋan	ta~ra	un	yu	ip
Butam	POSS		ŋaŋ	ŋiŋ	vat	vet	(r)uru	ŋan	(i)ra	(n)un	...	ip

== See also ==
- Baining people
- Papuan languages
