= Baining people =

Tribal peoples of Papua New Guinea

Baining
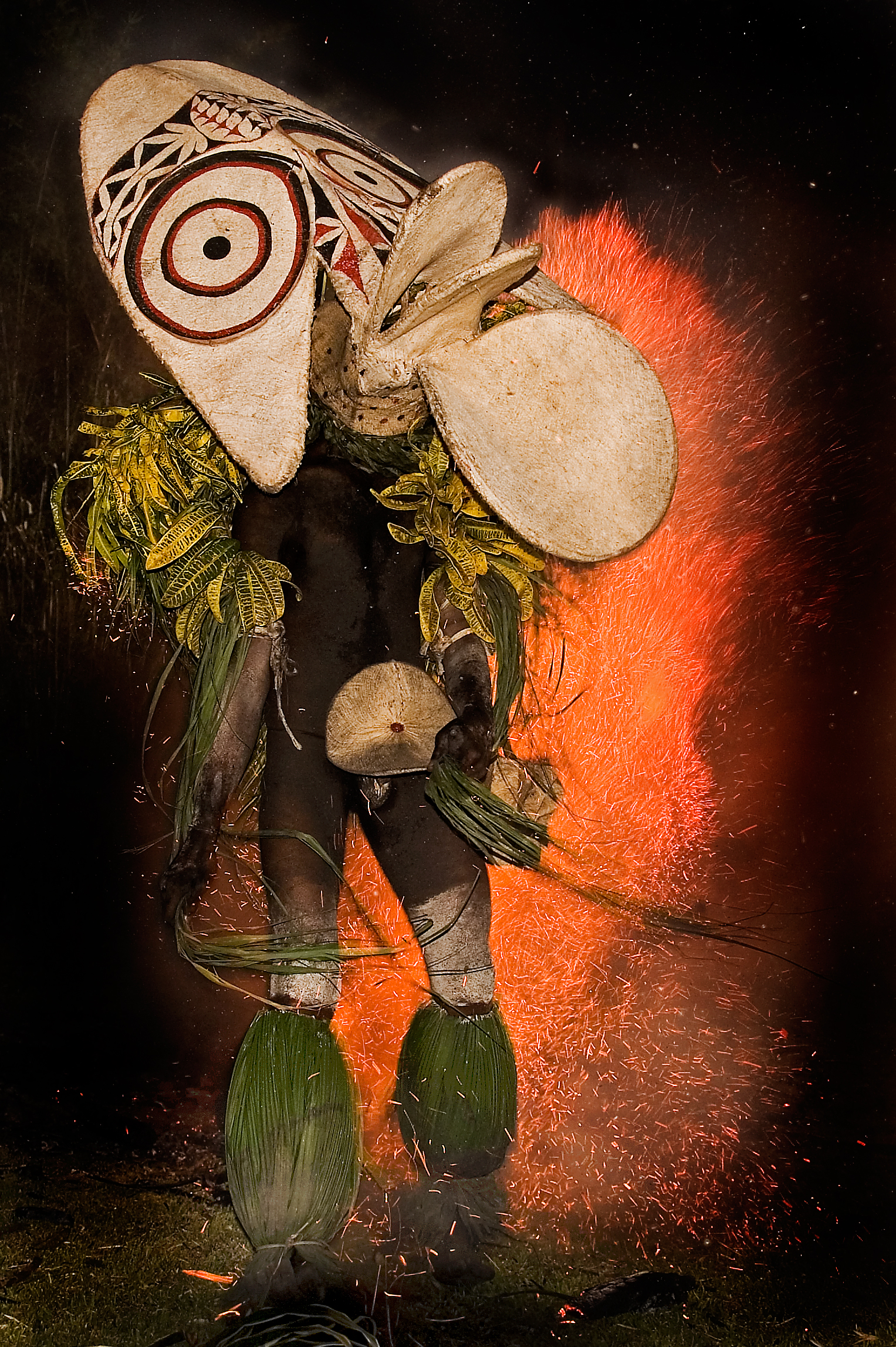
- Baining man performing traditional fire dance

Total population
- c. 12,000

Regions with significant populations
- East New Britain

Languages
- Baining languages

Religion
- Methodism; Catholicism; Pomio Kivung

Related ethnic groups
- None known

The Baining people are an ethnic group indigenous to the Gazelle Peninsula of East New Britain, Papua New Guinea; they currently inhabit the Baining Mountains, from which they take their name. They are considered a genetic isolate and speak the Baining languages, with each language corresponding to separate clan identities.

The Baining are thought to have been relatively recently driven to an inland area by the Tolai tribes who migrated to the coastal areas. The Baining migration westward may also have been influenced by major volcanic activity occurring over the centuries around the present day town of Rabaul on the north-east coast.

== History and culture ==
The Baining people are likely the original inhabitants of the Gazelle Peninsula. Their more recent history was defined by the arrival on the coast of Tolai immigrants, who subjugated the Baining and other nearby communities to raids. With the additional stress of epidemics and forced acculturation, mid 20th century missionaries spoke of the Baining as a "dying people", but the community has since recovered. Colonial administrators forced the Baining into settled villages, changing their previous semi-nomadic lifestyle, though their cultivation methods remained mostly unchanged.

The Baining are swidden (slash-and-burn) cultivators whose main traditional crop is taro: the 1957 taro blight caused considerable disruption to Baining agriculture, resulting in the replacement of most taro crops by singapu or kong-kong taro. Attempts to introduce bananas, beans and other staple crops to Baining villages were generally resisted, although a variety of other vegetables are grown alongside taro. Baining garden plots are often separated from villages and are provided with shelters in which people can temporarily stay.

Ethnographers have noted that, similar to Samoans, Baining culture focuses on an egalitarian outer social world where there is a strong commitment to the good of the community. Baining people have been described as having a culture which values work and encourages children to mature quickly by discouraging them from playing. However, this assessment has been challenged by several ethnographers, and Baining villagers themselves, who have confirmed that Baining children play regularly (including in local streams and in team sports) and that there is no general custom of punishing children for playing.

This supposed characteristic has contributed to a common modern Western perception that the Baining have a "dull" or "Puritan" culture focusing only on practical work and lacking symbolic logic, religion, and artistic expression: to some degree this mirrors early colonial-era studies which characterised them as a primitive 'Stone Age' people whose land was ripe for Western or Melanesian settlement. This modern "primitivist caricature" ignores studies which have described the Baining as having a rich cultural life, being based largely on two earlier "failed ethnographic projects" by Gregory Bateson and Jeremy Pool, both of whom failed to communicate effectively with the people they were studying.

A study conducted by Jane Fajans notes that existing anthropological theoretical frameworks are poor tools to analyse Baining culture. Online comment following an article by Thomas Hylland Eriksen, characterising the Baining as the "dullest culture" and based heavily on Fajans' work, was made almost entirely by writers unfamiliar with the Baining themselves or even with most of their ethnographers.

The Baining have a long history of localistic millenarian cults, notably Pomio Kivung, although the main leaders of the latter have been Mengen speakers. Several Baining villages have formed "proudly local" secessionist movements criticising Mengen cultural hegemony, while still following the main Kivung movement's structure.

=== Art and ceremonies ===
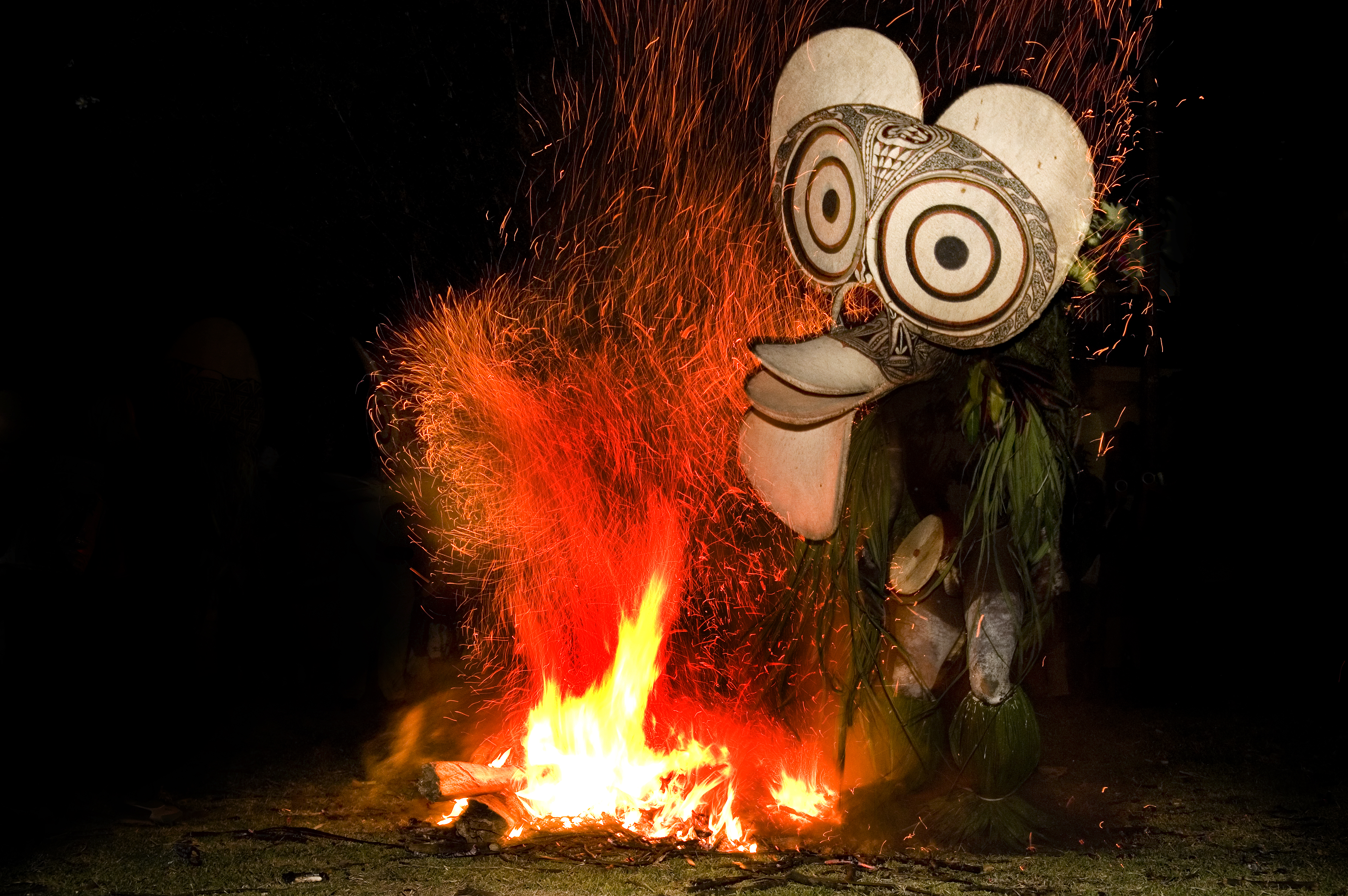
A Fire dancer of the Baining people, with kavat (bark cloth mask)

The best-known aspect of Baining artistic culture are night dance ceremonies, often called "fire dances", during which the dancers run through, leap over and kick the embers of a fire. The dances originated in Qaqet (northern) villages, where they were called atut, but have since been taken up by central and southern Baining. The dancers wear large masks laboriously made from bark cloth, bamboo and leaves: the masks are used just once for the fire dance ceremony before being discarded or destroyed. The masks are of two main types: in Kairak areas these are the kavat and the larger vungvung, the latter featuring an axial bamboo pole up to 13 feet (4.0 m) in length, and traditionally represented various male-associated animals and plants of the forest.

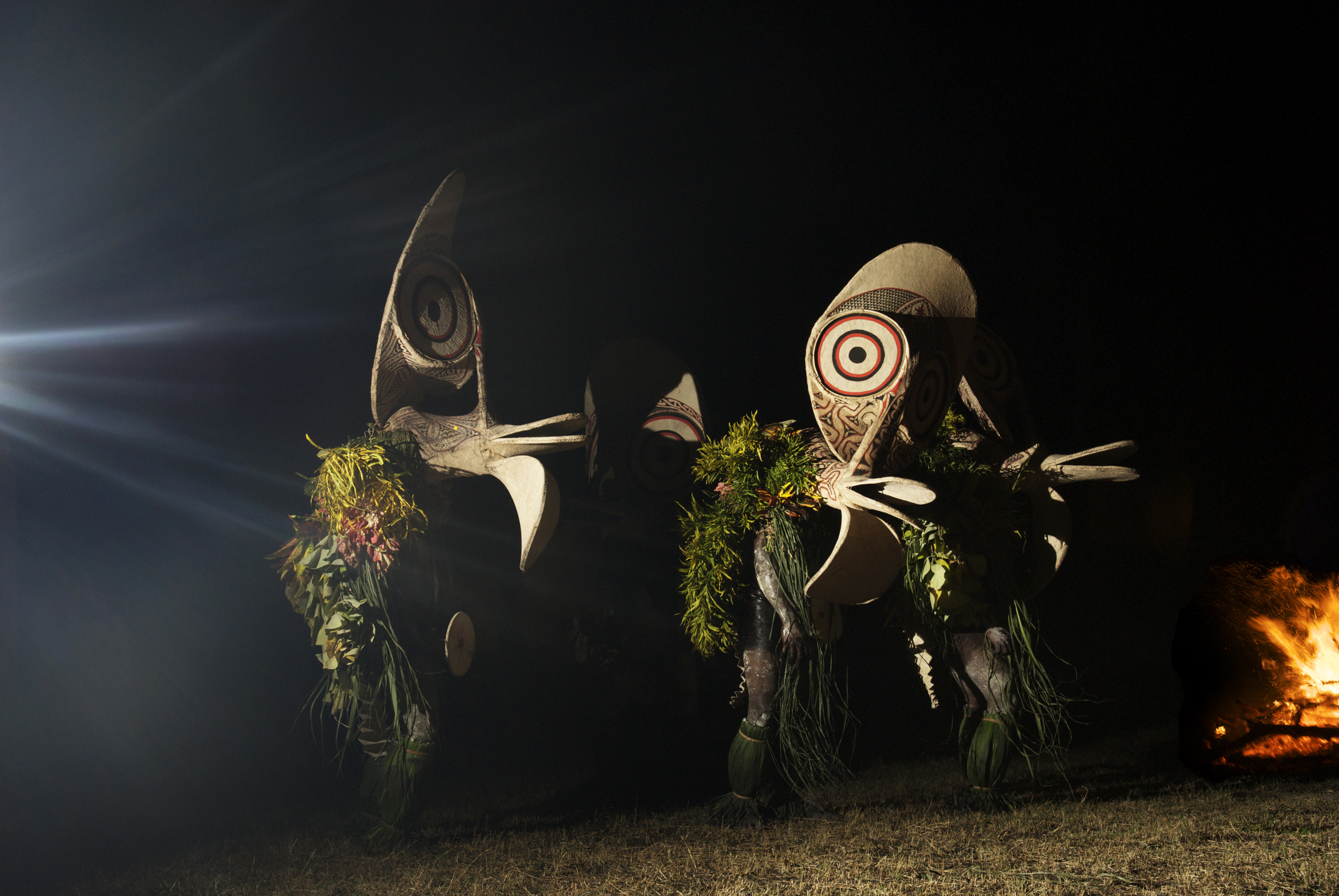
Group of Baining fire dancers

The origin of these fire dance ceremonies was to celebrate the birth of new children; the commencement of harvests and also a way of remembering the dead: in the late 20th century tourism has encouraged its revival. The Baining fire dance is also a rite of passage for initiating boys into adulthood; during the ceremony the dancers are considered to be possessed by anthropomorphised animal spirits or masalai that enhance the dancer's own masculinity. The dancers are accompanied by an all-male 'orchestra' of percussion instruments, and take turns parading through the dance ground: as the tempo increases the dancers will briefly dance through a large central bonfire. The dances last until daybreak, when members of the accompanying 'orchestra' chase the masks out of the dance grounds.

The fire dance is performed by men, and traditionally the Baining women and children act primarily as spectators, although the women often perform secret nocturnal rituals and dances to "cool" the main ritual site beforehand. In recent times the fire dance has become an essential part of local and international cultural festivals and a major draw to tourists: this has led the Baining to adopt it as a symbol of their cultural identity, using its iconic status as leverage to emphasise their differences from the Tolai.

== Languages ==
The Baining languages are a distinct language family spoken by the Baining. They are possibly related to the Taulil–Butam languages as well as to extinct Makolkol.

The languages, which correspond to clan groups, are:

- Kairak (900 speakers)
- Simbali (450 speakers)
- Mali (2,200 speakers)
- Qaqet (6,400 speakers)
- Ura (1,900 speakers)

Makolkol neighbored the (other) Baining languages to their southwest.

The label 'Baining' was originally applied to speakers of Qaqet, the first group in regular contact with administrators and missionaries, and the language family was originally classed as dialects of a single language. The wider genetic affiliation of the languages is unclear and they are usually classed negatively as non-Austronesian and non-Oceanic.

== Genetics ==
DNA studies indicate the Baining have experienced long-term genetic isolation, exhibiting an excess of long runs of homogeneity. The genetic split time between mainland Papuans and the Baining has been inferred to be 15.7 kya. Like other Papuans, the Baining have relatively high levels of Denisovan introgression (4%–6%), but slightly less than mainland Papuans.

== Bibliography ==
- Fajans, Jane (1997). They Make Themselves: Work and Play Among the Baining of Papua New Guinea. Chicago: University of Chicago Press. ISBN 0-226-23443-6.
- Falke-Simet, Naomi (2017). A Distinctive Voice in the Antipodes: Essays in Honour of Stephen A. Wild.
- Hellwig, Birgit (2019). A Grammar of Qaqet. De Gruyter Mouton.
- Ohreen, David (2004). The Scope and Limits of Folk Psychology. ISBN 3039104047.
- Pool, Gail. Lost Among the Baining: Adventure, Marriage, and Other Fieldwork. Columbia: University of Missouri Press, 2015. ISBN 0-826-22051-7
- Christakis, Nicholas (26 March 2019). "The Society Within Us". Blueprint. Little Brown Spark. ISBN 978-0-316-23003-2.
- Hudjashov, Georgi; Karafet, Tatiana M.; Lawson, Daniel J.; Downey, Sean; Savina, Olga; Sudoyo, Herawati; Lansing, J. Stephen; Hammer, Michael F.; Cox, Murray P. (1 October 2017). "Complex Patterns of Admixture across the Indonesian Archipelago". Molecular Biology and Evolution. 34 (10). doi:10.1093/molbev/msx196. ISSN 0737-4038. PMC 5850824. PMID 28957506.
- Jacobs, Guy S.; Hudjashov, Georgi; Saag, Lauri; Kusuma, Pradiptajati; Darusallam, Chelzie C.; Lawson, Daniel J.; Mondal, Mayukh; Pagani, Luca; Ricaut, François-Xavier; Stoneking, Mark; Metspalu, Mait; Sudoyo, Herawati; Lansing, J. Stephen; Cox, Murray P. (2019). "Multiple Deeply Divergent Denisovan Ancestries in Papuans" (PDF). Cell. 177 (4): 1010–1021.e32. doi:10.1016/j.cell.2019.02.035. PMID 30981557.
- Lattas, A (July 2020). "Re‐analysing the Baining: The Mytho‐Poetics of Race, Gender and Art". Oceania. 90 (2). Wiley. doi:10.1002/ocea.5248. hdl:11250/2763268.
- Pugach, Irina; Duggan, Ana T; Merriwether, D Andrew; Friedlaender, Françoise R; Friedlaender, Jonathan S; Stoneking, Mark (2 January 2018). "The Gateway from Near into Remote Oceania: New Insights from Genome-Wide Data". Molecular Biology and Evolution. 35 (4). Oxford University Press (OUP). doi:10.1093/molbev/msx333. hdl:21.11116/0000-0001-69C4-C. ISSN 0737-4038. PMC 5889034. PMID 29301001.
