= Qaqet language =

Baining language of Papua New Guinea

Qaqet
- Baining
- Pronunciation: [ɣɑɣə̆t̚]
- Native to: Papua New Guinea
- Region: New Britain
- Native speakers: 15,000 (2019)
- Language family: Baining: Qaqet

Language codes
- ISO 639-3: byx
- Glottolog: qaqe1238
- ELP: Qaqet
- Coordinates: 4.456156°S 151.784413°E

Qaqet (Kakat, Makakat, Maqaqet), or Baining, is a non-Austronesian language from the Baining family spoken in East New Britain Province on the island of New Britain, Papua New Guinea.

== Overview ==
Qaqet is spoken by some 15,000 people in the Gazelle Peninsula in the East New Britain Province of Papua New Guinea. Historically, the Qaqet used to lead highly mobile lives, subsisting of horticulture and hunting. Rather recently, colonial administrators have created permanent settlements. Today, villages with major Qaqet-speaking populations are:

- Raunsepna (4.456156°S 151.784413°E) in Inland Baining Rural LLG
- Kamanakam (4.284842°S 151.839181°E) in Inland Baining Rural LLG
- Walmetki (4.370491°S 151.554196°E) in Lassul Baining Rural LLG

Raunsepna is located in the mountainous interior, while the other two villages are located near the coast. Raunsepna's relative remoteness has implications for Qaqet's sociolinguistic status: as there are few outsiders there, Qaqet remains the dominant language in everyday life, and children acquire it as their first language. Kamanakam, by contrast, has seen an influx of settlers from adjacent ethnic groups, making inter-ethnic marriages common. This has resulted in Tok Pisin becoming the dominant language of that village.

== Classification ==
Qaqet belongs to the small Baining family, hence being a so-called Papuan language. The term Papuan is an umbrella classification that describes languages native to New Guinea and surrounding islands which are not part of the Austronesian language family. The other members of the Baining family are Mali, Qairaq, Simbali, Ura, and possibly Makolkol. Makolkol is probably extinct, and the information available for it is insufficient for determining its genetic affiliation.

The Baining languages are grouped with the other non-Austronesian languages of the region into the East Papuan Languages. However, despite attempts at establishing East Papuan as a genetic unit, the grouping remains purely geographical. Attempts at establishing relationships with neighbouring Papuan languages, such as Taulil or Butam, have so far not been successful.

== Phonology ==
Qaqet has a moderately small phoneme inventory consisting of 16 consonantal and 4 vowel phonemes. The orthography used here follows Hellwig (2019), which is in turn based on the orthography developed by Parker & Parker (1974). Where different from the IPA notation, the orthographic representation is given in square brackets.

=== Consonants ===
		Labial	Alveolar	Retroflex	Palatal	Velar
Nasal		m	n		ɲ ⟨ny⟩	ŋ ⟨ng⟩
Stop	voiceless	p	t			k
Stop	voiced	ᵐb ⟨b⟩	ⁿd ⟨d⟩			ᵑg ⟨g⟩
Fricative		β ⟨v⟩	s		ʝ~ɣ ⟨q⟩	
Tap/Trill			r	ɽ ⟨rl⟩		
Lateral			l			

The voiceless stops /p t k/ are often aspirated word-initially and unreleased word-finally. They have two other predictable allophones: voiced /b d g/ following a nasal, and lenited /v r q/ intervocalically. These last three phonemes probably arose historically out of their stop counterparts and are in the process of being phonemicized. While the alternation is still for the most part predictable, it has become contrastive for some aspectual verb stems. Also, loanwords don't undergo the lenition process: akar 'cars' (from Tok Pisin kar).

The velar stop is almost always palatalized in the vicinity of the vowel /i/. This holds for its voiced and fricativized allophones as well. Hence: a=vadem-ki [aβaⁿdəmɟi] 'trap', vrli-ki [βɽiʝi] 'cousin'. However, there are a couple of counterexamples, where palatalization doesn't occur even though it would be expected. For instance, in the word [aɣiapki] 'chicken', the velar fricative is not palatalized, even though it is followed by /i/. This might be explained by an earlier form of the word containing the sequence /ai/. In fact, the alternative realization [aɣaiapki] is attested.

The voiced stops appear as allophones of voiceless stops (as explained above), but also as phonemes in their own right. They can occur initially, intervocalically as well as after consonants, but not at the end of a syllable. They are usually prenasalized.

The voiceless fricative /s/ alternates with [h] in free variation. Speakers tend to associate [s] with the southern and [h] with the northern dialect, respectively. In practice, however, both variants seem to be used by speakers of all dialects, with no change in meaning.

=== Vowels ===
Qaqet has four short vowel phonemes:

	Front	Central	Back
Close	i		u
Mid		ə ⟨e⟩	
Open		a	

The close vowels are usually realized as lax [ɪ ʊ]. /i u/ can have allophones of semivowels [j w] when preceding other vowels. The open vowel /a/ undergoes assimilation to adjacent sounds: it is realized as back [ɑ] before [ɣ], but as front [æ] before palatal consonants, as well as front vowels in the next syllable. There is also variation across speakers between [a] and [ɐ]. The phoneme /ə/ is much shorter than the other vowels, especially in the vicinity of sonorants, where it is frequently elided, particularly in rapid speech. The vowel [o] only occurs in recent loanwords, such as botol 'bottle' (from Tok Pisin).

Vowel quantity is generally not contrastive in Qaqet, but long vowels do occur as the result of vowel sequences across morpheme boundaries. Sequences of /a/ and a high vowel become long monophthongs: a=ilany [eːlæɲ] 'leg/foot', a=ulan [oːlan] 'eel'. The vowel /i/ generally does not have a long counterpart, but is realized as [eː]: [meː] ~ [miː] 'most'. The short vowel /ə/ does not have a long counterpart. There are a small number of roots with long vowels which cannot be explained as the result of underlying vowel sequences, e.g. laan 'type of bamboo' vs. lan 'bones'.

There are diphthongs /ia/, /iu/, /ui/, /ua/, which occur even within roots. The diphthongs /ai/ and /au/ do occur, but are more commonly realized as long vowels [eː] and [oː].

=== Phonotactics ===
Qaqet's syllable structure can be summarized as (C)(C)V(V)(C). All consonants can occur at the onset of a syllable. Consonant clusters at the onset of a syllable usually consist of an obstruent followed by a sonorant, e.g. slep 'intensely', brasuqa 'eagle'; but there are also clusters of a nasal and a liquid, as in mrarlik 'cross'. In coda position, the plain stops /p t k/, the nasals /m n ɲ ŋ/, the fricative /s/ and the liquids /ɽ l/ can occur, but not the voiced stops /b d g/ or the lenited versions of the stops /β r ɣ/.

== Morphology and syntax ==
Word classes in Qaqet include nouns, adjectives, verbs, adverbs, and particles. As in many Indo-European languages, adjectives share many properties with nouns, but they are still different enough to be considered their own word class. However, many roots can occur in different word classes without any derivational morphology. This process, known in linguistics as conversion, is reminiscent of English (e.g. 'to walk' and 'a walk').

The most striking feature of Qaqet nominal morphology is its noun class system: all nouns belong to one of eight classes, two of which are based on sex, the others on shape. Additionally, nouns are marked for number (singular, dual, and plural). Typologically unusual, some nouns have an unmarked plural, rather than singular form. Adjectives, demonstratives, pronouns and verbs agree with nouns with respect to noun class and number. Both nominal classification as well as the singular-dual-plural distinction are common in East Papuan Languages. Qaqet also has articles, but no case.

Qaqet verbs distinguish aspect by using different verbal stems, and tense by using different subject indexes. They can also encode the object. Qaqet uses prepositions rather than postpositions. Just as in English, they can introduce arguments and adjuncts. They also frequently combine with verbs to form idiomatic meanings. There is also a dedicated class of particles, which are never obligatory but convey important discourse information. This is similar to languages like German.

Word order is generally SVO. This fact, along with the use of prepositions, is rather unusual, since Papuan languages tend to be verb-final and postpositional. Those features might be attributed to influence from the neighboring Austronesian languages.

=== Nouns ===
Within the noun phrase, determiners (including possessor indexes, articles, indefinite pronouns and demonstratives) usually precede the head noun, while modifiers (adjectives, numerals, quantifiers, prepositional phrases, directionals) tend to follow it, although there are exceptions. In the following example, the noun is preceded by the demonstrative luqa and the article ama-, while the adjective follows it:

mani ngutlu luqa amarluimga amatluqa
mani ngu=tlu lu-ka-a ama=rluim-ka ama=tlu-ka
recently 1SG.SBJ.NPST=see.CONT DEM-SG.M-DIST ART=child-SG.M ART=good-SG.M
'yesterday I saw that nice boy'

As can be seen from the example, adjectives agree with the noun they modify in noun class and number.

Nouns are almost always preceded by some determining element: an article, a possessor index, a demonstrative or an indefinite pronoun, or combinations of these. The generic noun marker a contrasts with the articles ama and ma. The former can be described as a Stage III article following Greenberg (1978): it probably evolved from a definite article, but has now lost all of those functions and merely marks nouns. It cannot occur with most proper names, nor in combination with possessor indexes. The articles ama and ma can occur even with proper names, and they have a more specific meaning than the general noun marker a. Their main function is to mark a noun for referentiality. Moreover, ama can connect a qualifying adjective to a preceding noun, as can be seen in the example above. The difference between ama and ma is that the latter marks a noun as inherently identifiable. Hence, it frequently occurs with proper nouns.

=== Numerals ===
Below is a list of Qaqet numerals (see Hellwig 2019: 90–91, Tab. 31).

1	qunaska	11	malepka ngenaqa	30	malev amadepguas ~ depguas namamalep
2	qunasiam	12	malepka ngenaiam	40	malev amarlatpes ~ rlatpes namamalep
3	depguas	13	malepka ngenadepguas	50	malev amangariqit ~ ngariqit namamalep
4	rlatpes	14	malepka ngenarlatpes	60	malev amangariqit ngenaqa ~ ngariqit ngenaqa namamalep
5	ngariqit	15	malepka ngenangariqit	70	malev amangariqit ngenaiam ~ ngariqit ngenaiam namamalep
6	ngariqit ngenaqa	16	malepka ngenangariqit ngenaqa	80	malev amangariqit ngenadepguas ~ ngariqit ngenadepguas namamalep
7	ngariqit ngenaiam	17	malepka ngenangariqit ngenaiam	90	malev amangariqit ngenarlatpes ~ ngariqit ngenarlatpes namamalep
8	ngariqit ngenadepguas	18	malepka ngenangariqit ngenadepguas	100	malepka namamalep ~ ganemgi
9	ngariqit ngenarlatpes	19	malepka ngenangariqit ngenarlatpes	1000	ngerlnanngi
10	malepka	20	maleviam		

Qaqet's number system is basically decimal, with base words for 10, 100, and 1000. However, 5 is used as an auxiliary base, such that the words for 6-9 are formed by adding the numerals for 1–4 to the number 5. The word for 1 consists of the root qunas and the noun class suffix -ka, while the word for 2 uses the same root with the dual suffix -iam. The same logic is applied to form the numerals for 10 and 20. Addition is expressed through the element ngena- 'plus, together with'.

There are two structures for forming higher multiples of ten. One puts malev 'ten' first, then adds the factor with the article ama-. The other puts the factor first and inserts the preposition ne- 'from, with' (nama- is a contraction of that preposition and the article ama-). Both of these structures were obtained through elicitation. In practice, Qaqet speakers generally switch to Tok Pisin for numerals above 10. It is not known whether any of the higher numerals are used in natural speech.
