= Baining =

Baining may refer to:

- Baining people
- Baining languages
- Baining Mountains
- Inland Baining Rural LLG
- Lassul Baining Rural LLG
