= Vunakapeake =

- Village
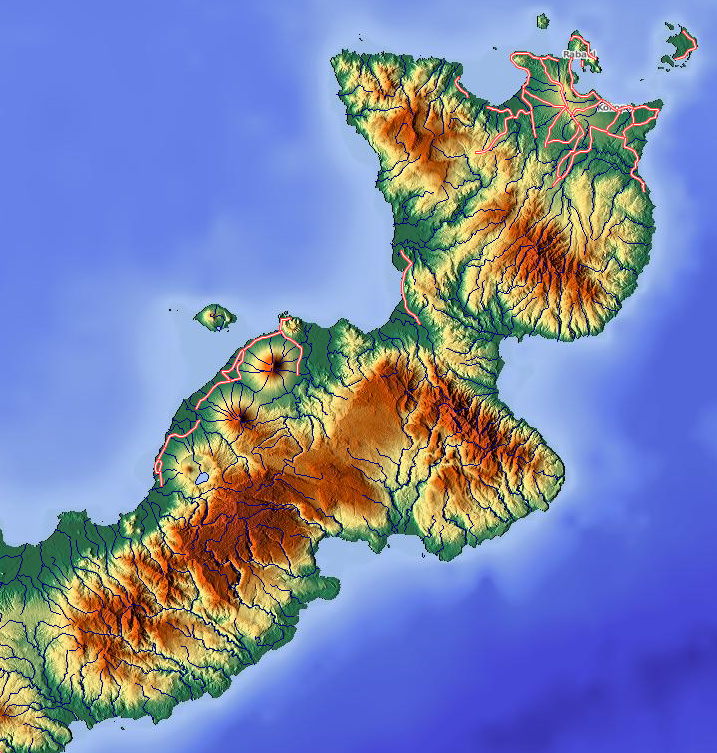
- Location in New Britain
- Coordinates: 4°13′S 151°48′E
- Country: Papua New Guinea
- Province: East New Britain Province
- District: Gazelle District

Vunakapeake is a village located on the north coast of the Gazelle Peninsula on the island of New Britain, East New Britain Province, Papua New Guinea. The village lies to the east of Lassul Bay and to the west of Ataliklikun Bay.
