= Pomio Kivung =

Millenarian movement in Papua New Guinea

The Pomio Kivung movement ("Meeting") is a millenarian movement, sometimes called a cargo cult, practiced among the villagers in the Baining and Pomio areas in East New Britain, Papua New Guinea.

== History ==
The movement merged two millenarian influences, one belonging to Koriam Urekit who had tried to start a movement in the Arawe area, and the other by Bernard Balatape who began a local movement feeding the dead at the Pomio of Kaiton. The movement was instrumental in electing Koriam to the House of Assembly as member for Kandrian-Pomio Open. Later the movement encompassed the Baining people when the electorate was redrawn to remove the Kandrian area and to include the Baining in the south Gazelle Peninsula. In the Baining area, around this time (prior to 1974 when he returned to Pomio), Kolman Kintape who was originally from Pomio, was managing Warwick Plantation (near the villages of Sunam and Dadul). He was developing magic to make money multiply and possess ritual knowledge for feeding the dead. Kolman was visited at Warwick Plantation by Koriam and Alois Koki. The history of the Baining peoples is strongly influenced by the seventeenth-century migration of the Tolai, a Melanesian people who drove the Papuan Baining from the fertile volcanic regions of the north-east of New Britain. Following the arrival of European colonists, Tolai people had favourable access to Western education and government, enabling further exploitation of the neighbouring Baining. The emulation of Western government and the sense of ethnic unity produced by the rivalry with the Tolai provided the bases of Baining culture that resulted in Pomio Kivung.

The movement itself was founded by Koriam Urekit upon his election in 1964, following a prophecy made by the Pomio spiritual leader Bernard Balatape ('Bernard') the year before. During Koriam's parliamentary career he, Bernard, and his successor Kolman Kintape Molu ("Kolman") were all accorded a divine stature by Pomio Kivung devotees, as intermediaries between the physical and spiritual worlds. Koriam held the Pomio-Kandrian parliament seat until his death in 1973; Alois Koki occupied the seat until his own death in 2000 and the seat was continuously held by other Pomio Kivug members.

== Beliefs ==
The Pomio Kivung movement incorporates narratives of sovereignty and economic development, syncretic Christianity, and traditional Papuan ancestor worship into a single religious system. Its adherents believe in a coming millennium, during which the ancestors of Pomio-Baining people will return as "Western scientists and industrialists" to transform East New Britain into a vast urban metropolis, politically and economically independent from Papua New Guinea. During this period – referred to as the "Period of the Companies" (Tok Pisin: Taim bilong Kampani), every material need will be provided for. However, those who do not indulge themselves in this time and instead devote themselves to the movement will enter a second millennium, the paradisaical "Period of Government" (Taim bilong Gavman) free of death, disease, reproduction, work and warfare. During the Period of Government, the living Baining will be able to remove their brown skin to find healthy white skin underneath. Those who give into hedonism during the Period of the Companies will instead find themselves in Hell or "jail" (kalibus).

This millenarian vision is accompanied by a mystical belief in the present existence of "government" (Gavman) on a spiritual plane. God and virtuous ancestors reside on this plane, referred to as the "Ancestral Council" (Kaunsel Tumbuna) or "Village Government" (Vilij Gavman), and devotees look forward to joining it after death. Ancestors on this plane also take part in voting during elections, providing success to Pomio Kivung candidates over their opponents. Unlike the Christian Heaven, this plane is conceptually located underground, as part of a web of metaphors contrasting the material surface or "skin" (patuna) with underlying spiritual reality or "food" (kaikai). Devotion to this spiritual plane is described in the language of government (a request for ancestral intercession, for example, is often called a "report", and its recipients are called "secretaries"), partly as a kind of anti-language to disguise its meaning from Melanesian authorities and partly as a real spiritual expression of material needs.

Pomio Kivung is also characterised by a strong reverence for an altered version of the Ten Commandments (Tenpela Lo), which are represented by a decorative pole inscribed with the Roman numerals I to X placed in every Pomio Kivung village. These Commandments, followers believe, were taught to Koriam by a white man named "brother" (Brata). Those who break the Commandments are required to perform penance in the form of silent contemplation, called a "Check" (Sek), in front of a money jar called "Television". The spiritual essence of money raised through "Televisions" is believed to go to the Gavman under the earth, while its "skin" (material existence) is sent to "buy government" (Baim gavman) around the world to hasten the arrival of the millennium.
