= Mondrabet =

- Village
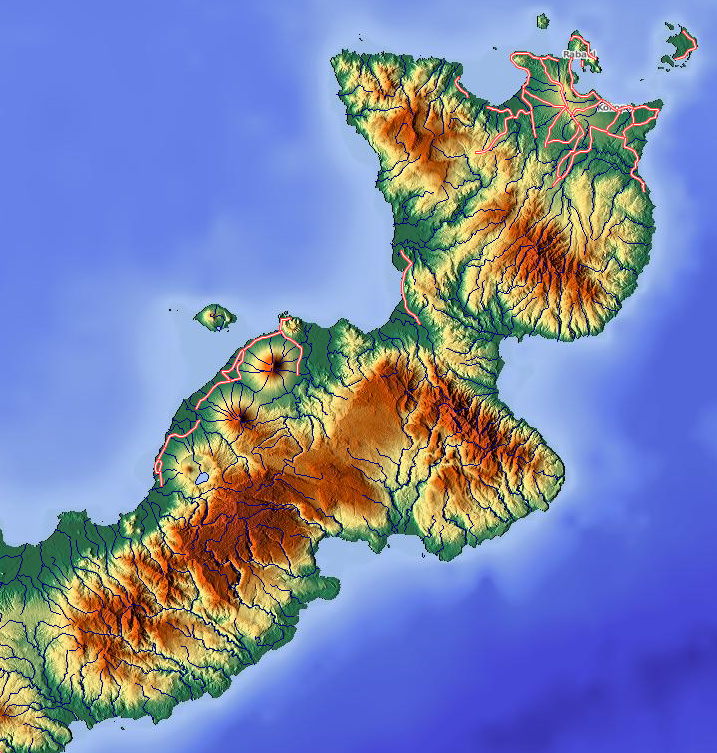
- Location in New Britain
- Coordinates: 4°43′35″S 151°45′10″E
- Country: Papua New Guinea
- Province: East New Britain Province

Mondrabet is a large village on the island of New Britain, East New Britain Province, Papua New Guinea. The village lies in the south-western part of the Gazelle Peninsula, to the east of coastal village of Torin, upstream along the Torin River near its confluence with another river. It is also connected by dirt road to Matanakunai on the coast in the south-west.
