= TUH =

TUH or tuh may refer to:

- Taulil language, New Britain, Papua New Guinea, ISO 639-3 code
- Temple University Hospital, an academic medical center in Philadelphia, Pennsylvania
- Tulse Hill railway station, London, National Rail station code
