= Lassul Bay =

Bay in Papua New Guinea

- Location within Papua New Guinea
- Coordinates: 4°12′45″S 151°43′27″E
- Type: Bay
- Basin countries: Papua New Guinea

Lassul Bay is a bay of East New Britain Province, Papua New Guinea, opening into the Bismarck Sea. It is located in the north-western part of New Britain, to the west of Ataliklikun Bay on the Gazelle Peninsula. The communities around Lassul Bay are incorporated into the twenty-one wards of the Lassul-Baining Local-Level Government (LLG) including the settlement of Lassul. The land around the shoreline is swampy and the area has a history of plantation cultivation. The area was invaded in February 1942 by the Japanese during the Battle of Rabaul.
