= Black Silent Majority =

2015 book by Michael Javen Fortner

- Author: Michael Javen Fortner
- Language: English
- Genre: Non-fiction
- Publisher: Harvard University Press
- Publication date: 2015
- Publication place: United States
- Media type: Print (Hardback)
- Pages: 368 pp
- ISBN: 978-0674743991

Black Silent Majority: The Rockefeller Drug Laws and the Politics of Punishment is a non-fiction book written by Michael Javen Fortner.

== Overview ==
A look into the role of how America's drug policies impact African Americans and crime in their own neighborhoods.

== Critical reception ==
The New York Times said in a review of the book, "The history of black people’s ability to express and to act on their punitiveness—to be tough on crime—is at the heart of a fascinating though severely flawed new book by Michael Javen Fortner."

The Boston Review wrote: "Black Silent Majority skillfully incorporates and blunts opposing arguments but refuses to take seriously the consequences of poverty, redlining, and other forms of structural exclusion."

== Awards ==
- 2015, The Herbert H. Lehman Prize for History
