= Sinivit Rural LLG =

Local-level government in Papua New Guinea

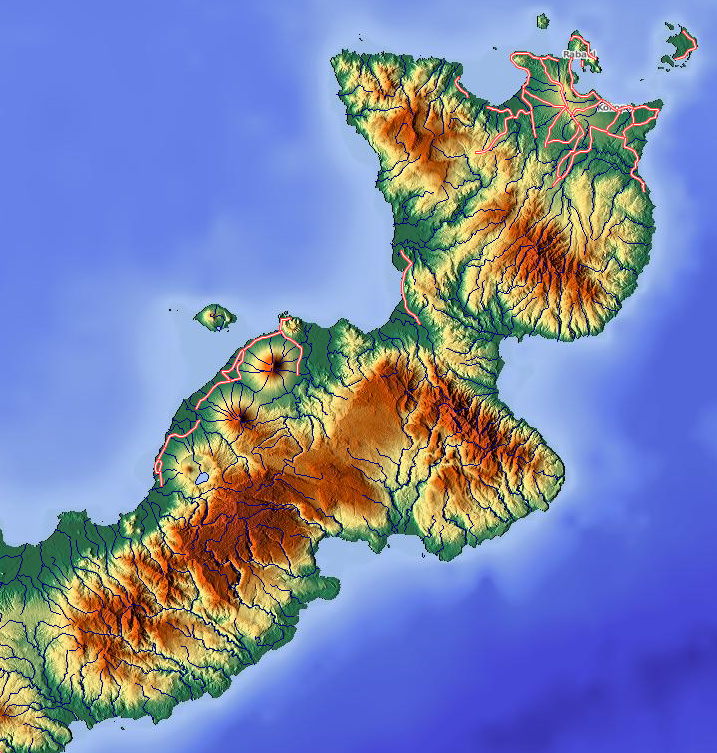
- Location within Papua New Guinea
- Coordinates: 4.970382°S 152.043503°E
- Country: Papua New Guinea
- Province: East New Britain Province
- Time zone: UTC+10 (AEST)

Sinivit Rural LLG is a local-level government (LLG) of East New Britain Province, Papua New Guinea.

== Wards ==
- 01. Rieit
- 02. Arabam
- 03. Maranagi
- 04. Reigal
- 05. Sanbum
- 06. Marambu
- 07. Lat
- 08. Gar
- 09. Merai
- 10. Ili
- 11. Karong
- 12. Sunam
- 13. Marunga (Mali language speakers)
- 14. Kavudemki (Simbali language speakers)
- 15. Tol
- 16. Sikut
- 17. Ivon/Gore
- 18. Laup
- 19. Kadalung No. 1
