= West Pomio/Mamusi Rural LLG =

Local-level government in Papua New Guinea

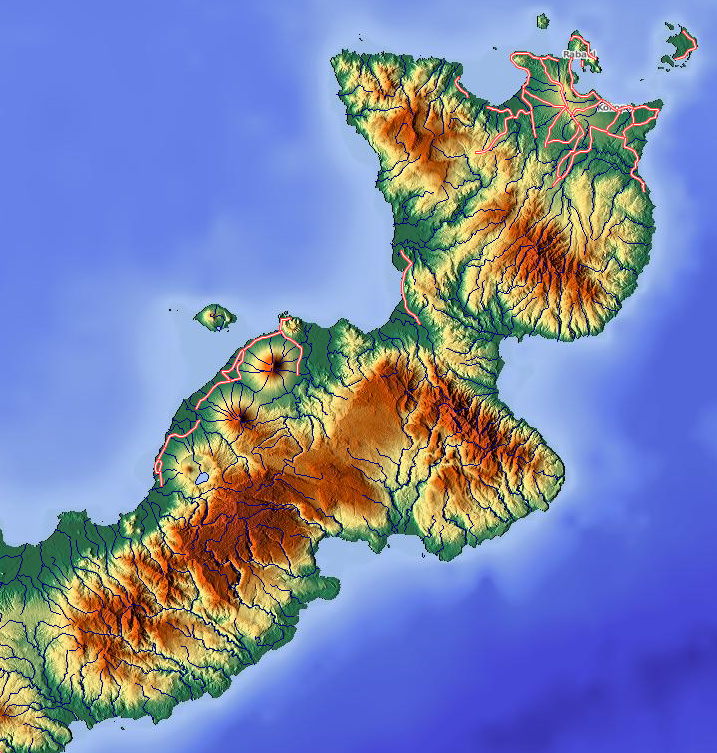
- Location within Papua New Guinea
- Coordinates: 5.63033°S 151.49322°E
- Country: Papua New Guinea
- Province: East New Britain Province
- Time zone: UTC+10 (AEST)

West Pomio/Mamusi Rural LLG is a local-level government (LLG) of East New Britain Province, Papua New Guinea. The Upper dialect of the Ata language is spoken in the LLG.

== Wards ==
- 01. Gugulena
- 02. Malmal
- 03. Manginuna
- 04. Totongpal
- 05. Kaiton
- 06. Puapal
- 07. Rowan/Malo
- 08. Pomai/Mu
- 09. Poro/Salel
- 10. Irena
- 11. Kangelona
- 12. Mauna
- 13. Lau
- 14. Bairaman
- 15. Tolel
- 16. Maitao
- 17. Serenguna
- 18. Paliavulu
- 19. Viosopuna
- 20. Pokapuna
- 21. Bili
- 22. Pakia
- 23. Okempuna
- 24. Kaitoto
- 25. Mapuna
- 26. Peling
- 27. Aona
- 28. Yauyau
- 29. Kaikou
- 30. Kinsena
- 31. Ulutu
- 32. Kerongkorona
- 33. Sivaona
- 34. Pepeng
