= Gail Pool =

American writer and critic

Gail Pool is an American writer and critic, whose work has focused on books, the culture of magazines, and travel.

== Early life and education ==
Pool was born in New York City, where she attended Little Red School House and Hunter College High School. She concentrated in Greek and Latin at Harvard University, graduating in 1967. In 1966, Gail married Harvard classmate, Jeremy Pool, and in 1969-70, for Jeremy's fieldwork in anthropology at the London School of Economics, the couple spent sixteen months (1969–70) living with the Baining of New Britain, in what was then the Territory of Papua and New Guinea. Pool wrote about this powerful experience for the New York Times, and in her book, Lost Among the Baining: Adventure, Marriage, and Other Fieldwork (University of Missouri Press, 2015). Pool has lived in San Francisco, where she received an MA in English and Creative Writing at San Francisco State University, and in Brookline, Massachusetts, where she received an MLS at Simmons School of Library and Information Science and was elected to the board of trustees at the Brookline Public Library. She and her husband now live in Cambridge, Massachusetts, and spend winters in Sanibel, Florida. She has one son.

== Work ==
In 1976, Pool became editor of Boston Review, then a newly founded arts magazine called New Boston Review. She left in 1980, passing the publication on to Arthur J. Rosenthal, director of the Harvard University Press, and for the next decade wrote about the culture and business of magazines, writing a column in Wilson Library Bulletin, and articles in such publications as Columbia Journalism Review, Massachusetts Review, and the Radcliffe Quarterly. As a book critic in the 1980s and 1990s, Pool wrote a travel literature column for the Christian Science Monitor, and a fiction column for the Cleveland Plain Dealer that also appeared in the San Diego Union-Tribune and the Houston Post. She reviewed for many publications, including the New York Times, was a regular contributor to the Women’s Review of Books, and for many years was books editor of the Radcliffe Quarterly. In two essays she wrote during this time—"Inside Book Reviewing," which appeared in Boston Review and was selected for Best of Library Literature 1987, and “Too Many Reviews of Scholarly Books are Puffy, Nasty, or Poorly Written,” which appeared in the Chronicle of Higher Education—she developed her critique of reviewing that led to her book, Faint Praise: The Plight of Book Reviewing in America. Pool taught writing at Emmanuel College and at the Radcliffe Seminars.

== Bibliography ==
- Other People’s Mail: An Anthology of Letter Stories, University of Missouri Press (2000), ISBN 978-0-8262-1246-7
- Faint Praise: The Plight of Book Reviewing in America, University of Missouri Press (2007), ISBN 978-0-8262-1727-1
- Lost Among the Baining: Adventure, Marriage, and Other Fieldwork, University of Missouri Press (2015), ISBN 978-0-8262-2051-6

== Selected essays and reviews ==
“An Interview with Grace Paley,” New Boston Review, Winter 1976.

“Anne Sexton: Poetry and Witchcraft,” New Boston Review, Spring 1978, reprinted in Contemporary Literary Criticism.

“Jean Rhys: Life’s Unfinished Form,” Chicago Review, Spring 1981; reprinted by Gale, 2005–2006.

“Women’s Publications: Some Issues,” The Massachusetts Review, Spring 1983.

“Can Magazines Find Happiness With Cable?” Columbia Journalism Review, January 1983; reprinted in Readings in Mass Communications, Scott, Foresman, 1988.

“How to Cook Your Goose: A Survey of Women’s Magazines,” Radcliffe Quarterly, 1984.

“Are Health Magazines Good For You?”, Radcliffe Quarterly, June 1985; reprinted in Medica: Women Practicing Medicine, December 1985.

“The Computer Magazines’ Puffery Problem,” Columbia Journalism Review, September 1, 1985; reprinted in Computer User, Spring 1986, and in Newsday, 1987.

“Inside Book Reviewing,” Boston Review, 1987; reprinted in Best of Library Literature 1987, ed. Bill Katz, Scarecrow Press, 1988.

“View from the Masthead: Women in Magazine Publishing,” Radcliffe Quarterly, Spring 1988.

“Point of View: Book Reviewing,” Chronicle of Higher Education, July 20, 1988; reprinted in Contemporary Literary Criticism Select, Gale, 2001.

“Travelers in a Golden Age,” Boston Review, August 1988.

“Nonfiction in Children’s Magazines,” The Horn Book Magazine, July/August 1990.

“Imagination’s Invisible Ink: Carol Shields’s Stone Diaries,” Women's Review of Books, May 1994; reprinted in Contemporary Literary Criticism.

“Censorship/Self-Censorship in Book Reviewing,” Women's Review of Books, September 1994.

“Dawn Powell,” entry in American Women Writers, Crossroad/Continuum, 1994.

Cynthia Ozick, entry in American Women's Writers, Crossroad/Continuum, 1994.

“Magazines for Children,” in The Reader's Companion to Twentieth-Century Children's Literature, Houghton Mifflin, 1995.

“A Tradition of Terror: Women in the Trees,” Women's Review of Books, March 1997.

“Defensive Reading,” New York Times Sunday Travel Section, October 25, 1998.

“Pictures From an Expedition: Master Georgie by Beryl Bainbridge,” Women's Review of Books, Jan. 1999; reprinted in Contemporary Literary Criticism.

“Gail Pool is Enchanted by Lee Smith,” Women's Review of Books, July 1999.

“When A Grand View Has a Steep Price,” New York Times Sunday Travel Section, October 24, 1999.

“Book Reviewing: Do It Yourself,” Women's Review of Books, March/April 2008.
