= Mark Silk =

American academic

- Born: May 12, 1950 (age 76); Boston, Massachusetts

Academic background
- Education: Harvard College (1972 AB) magna cum laude Harvard University (1982 PhD)

Mark Silk is an American academic. He is Professor of Religion in Public Life at Trinity College, where he also serves as the Director the Leonard E. Greenberg Center for the Study of Religion in Public Life. In addition, Silk is a Contributing Editor of the Religion News Service, specializing in Spiritual Politics.

== Early life and education ==
Silk was born in Cambridge, Massachusetts, on May 12, 1950, and graduated from Harvard College in 1972, magna cum laude. In 1982 he earned a Ph.D. in medieval history from Harvard. He was editor of the Boston Review from 1985 to 1986, and worked as a reporter, editorial writer, and columnist for the Atlanta Journal-Constitution.

== Career ==
Silk is the author of Spiritual Politics: Religion and America Since World War II and Unsecular Media: Making News of Religion in America and co-editor of Religion by Region, an eight-volume series on religion and public life in the United States, and columnist for the Religion News Service. With Andrew Walsh he wrote the series summary volume, One Nation Divisible: How Regional Religious Differences Shape American Politics, published in hardcover in 2008.

In the 1980s and 1990s Silk was a regular contributor to the New York Times, contributing essays and book reviews on feminist theology, new religious movements, Jewish identity, and other religion-related topics. In 1984 he traced the use of "Judeo-Christian" in American culture. In 1995 he argued that the American news media approach religion with certain Western religious preconceptions that do not always do justice to the varieties of religious belief and behavior. In 2005, he traced the history of the idea of civil religion through changing views of the figure of Numa Pompilius, the second king of Rome. Since 2007 Silk has blogged about religion in public life at Spiritual Politics that began as "A blog on religion and the 2008 election campaign" and is hosted at Religion News Service.

Silk's areas of speciality include religion in America, religion and media, medieval history, and intellectual history of the West. As of 2021, Silk teaches Religion and American Politics and Religion and Climate Change at Trinity College.
