= Butam language =

Papuan language of New Britain

Butam
- Region: New Britain
- Extinct: (date missing)
- Language family: East New Britain: Taulil–Butam; Butam

Language codes
- ISO 639-3: None (mis)
- Glottolog: buta1242

Butam is a possibly extinct Papuan language spoken in East New Britain Province on the island of New Britain, Papua New Guinea. It is related to Taulil. Like the Taulil, the Butam people had originally migrated from New Ireland.
