= Kokopo/Vunamami Urban LLG =

Local-level government in Papua New Guinea

Kokopo/Vunamami Rural LLG
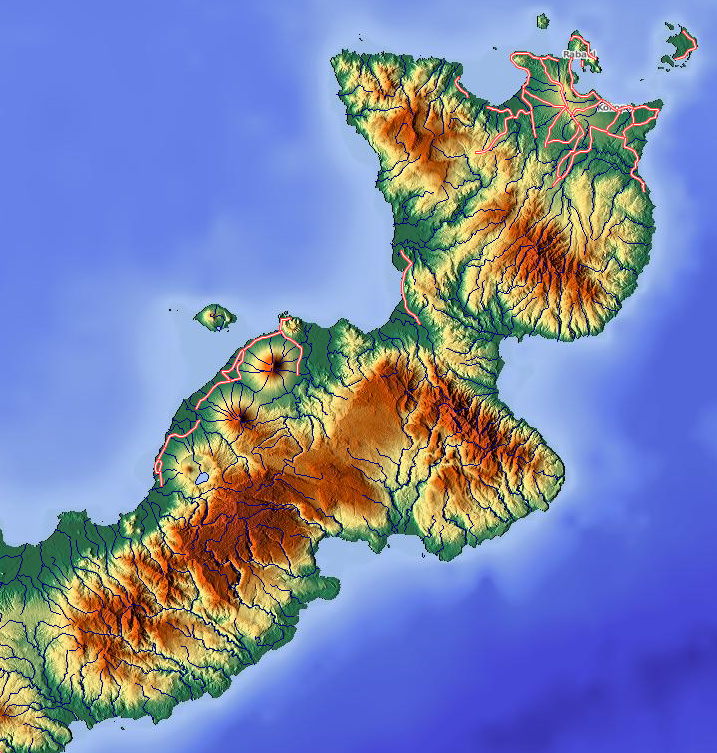
- Location within Papua New Guinea
- Coordinates: 4.330171°S 152.25522°E
- Country: Papua New Guinea
- Province: East New Britain Province
- Time zone: UTC+10 (AEST)

Kokopo/Vunamami Rural LLG is a local-level government (LLG) of East New Britain Province, Papua New Guinea.

== Wards ==
- 01. Karavi
- 02. Vunamami
- 03. Bitarebarebe
- 04. Vunabalbal
- 05. Gunanba
- 06. Tinganavudu
- 07. Malakuna
- 08. Ulagunan
- 09. Livuan
- 10. Ramale
- 11. Bitagalip
- 12. Kabakaul
- 13. Takubar
- 14. Palnakaur
- 15. Ulaulatava
- 16. Vunapope
- 17. Ngunguna
- 18. Gunanur
- 19. Palavirua
- 20. Vunamami No.2
- 80. Kokopo Town
