= Ata language =

Papuan language spoken on New Britain island

Ata
- Pele-Ata
- Native to: Papua New Guinea
- Region: New Britain
- Native speakers: 2,000 (2007)
- Language family: West New Britain?: Ata

Language codes
- ISO 639-3: ata
- Glottolog: pele1245
- ELP: Pele-Ata

The Ata language, also known as Pele-Ata after its two dialects, or Wasi, is a Papuan language spoken on New Britain island, Papua New Guinea. It appears to be related to neighboring Anêm, and possibly also to Yélî Dnye in a proposed Yele-West New Britain family. There are about 2000 speakers.

Ata is spoken in West Pomio-Mamusi Rural LLG, East New Britain Province, and in Talasea District, West New Britain Province.

== Dialects ==
According to Yanagida (2004), there are two dialects of Ata, a Lower dialect spoken in the lowlands and an Upper dialect spoken in the mountains. The Lower dialect is spoken in Bialla Rural LLG, West New Britain Province, while the Upper dialect is spoken mostly in West Pomio-Mamusi Rural LLG, East New Britain Province:

Lower dialect (in Bialla Rural LLG, West New Britain Province):

- Kiava (Old Kiava) (5.43047°S 151.047°E)
- Korovasi
- Malasi (5.46557°S 150.978°E)
- Milikina (Elobe) (5.56842°S 150.892°E)
- Mulusi
- Ole
- Sale (Gogosi) (5.52855°S 150.963°E)
- Sege (5.52977°S 150.923°E)
- Silanga [settlement] (5.55438°S 150.849°E)

Upper dialect (in West Pomio-Mamusi Rural LLG, East New Britain Province, unless noted otherwise):

- Sipa (Bauka), West New Britain (5.59544°S 150.887°E)
- Uasilau [settlement], West New Britain (5.58284°S 150.884°E)
- Kaikou (5.652238°S 150.992254°E)
- Lavugi (5.641182°S 150.967552°E)
- Luge, West New Britain (5.56239°S 150.851°E)
- Ti (5.644822°S 151.000275°E)
- Yauyau (5.627284°S 150.959744°E)
- Kukulu (5.644822°S 151.000275°E)

Both the lower and upper dialects are spoken in the settlement of Silanga.

There are some lexical differences between the dialects. Some examples are listed below.

gloss	Upper Ata	Lower Ata
rain	uali	laʔiua
sweet potato	totoʔo	kelatu
cassava	mio	mio, mioxa
throw something	paxele	pei
yes	iou	ani
the day before yesterday	malakaumei	malaʔo
2nd person dual independent pronoun	ngolou	ngongou
3rd person dual independent pronoun	olou	ilou

== Phonology ==
Phonology of the Ata language:

Consonant sounds
	Labial	Alveolar	Velar	Glottal
Nasal	m	n	ŋ	
Plosive	p	t	k	ʔ
Fricative	β	s	x	
Approximant		l		

/s/ is pronounced as alveolo-palatal [ɕ] before /i/, /x/ is voiced as [ɣ] when occurring intervocalically.

A word-initial /i/ is realized as a [j], and a word-initial /u/ becomes a [w] when preceding /o/ or /ɑ/.

Vowel sounds
	Front	Back
High	i iː	u uː
Mid	ɛ ɛː	o oː
Low	ɑ ɑː	

== Noun classes ==
Ata makes use of noun classes, some of which are:

- Class 1 nouns: stationary and function in a state of relative stagnancy
- Class 2 nouns: portable and function in a state of relative motion
- Class 3 nouns: relating to the body's internal needs

Below are some Ata noun class paradigms, using the noun roots lavo'o 'stone' and lexe 'song' as examples:

root	lavo'o	/stone/	'stone'
Class 1	lavo'o-silo	/stone-my/	'my stone to be used for a house'
Class 2	lavo'o-xeni	/stone-my/	'my stone to be used for breaking nuts'
Class 3	lavo'o-xo	/stone-my/	'my stone for a stone oven'

root	lexe	/song/	'song'
Class 1	lexe-silo	/song-my/	'a song to be sung for me'
Class 2	lexe-xeni	/song-my/	'the song I sing'
Class 3	lexe-xo	/song-my/	'the song about me'

== Vocabulary ==
Selected basic vocabulary items in Ata:

gloss	Ata
bird	ngiala
blood	sialuxu
bone	xine
breast	susu
ear	sangalie
eat	'ie
egg	atolu
eye	iei
fire	navu
give	iti; losie
go	lai
ground	lia
leg	tava'a
louse	meni
man	aliko
moon	so'io
name	uala
one	vile
road, path	vote'i
see	maisou
sky	loxotolo
stone	lavo'o
sun	aso
tongue	levexe
teeth	anaxu ilaanu (anaxu = 'mouth')
tree	aiinu; ovu
two	tamei
water	lexa
woman	sema

== See also ==
- East Papuan languages
