= Gazelle Peninsula =

Peninsula in Papua New Guinea

Coordinates: 4.6°S 152°E

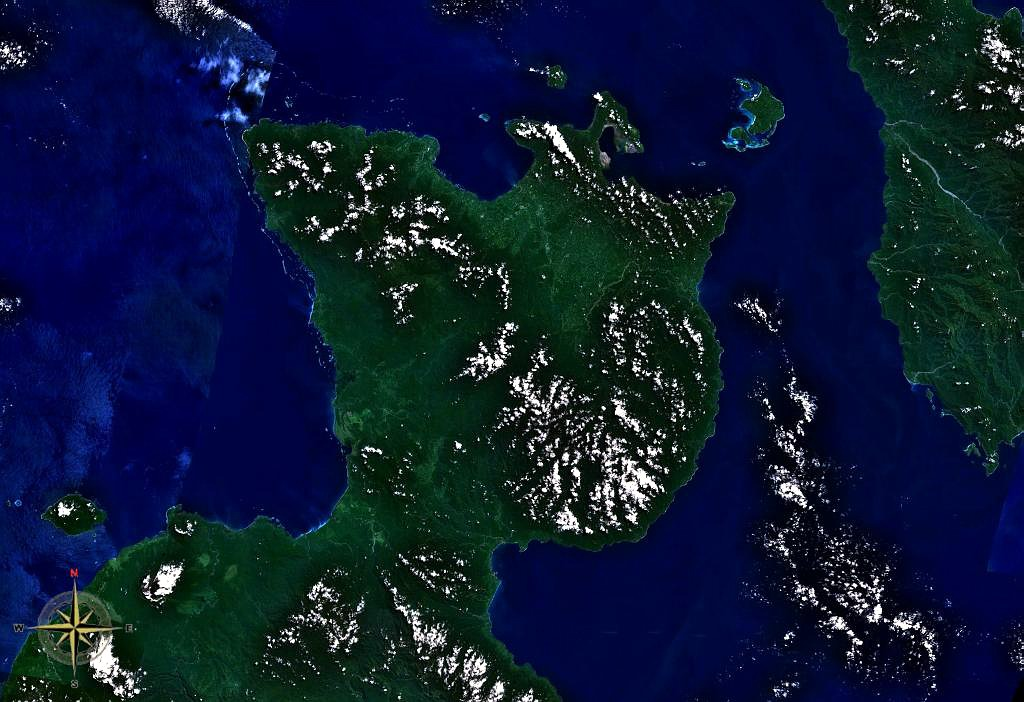
Gazelle Peninsula seen from space

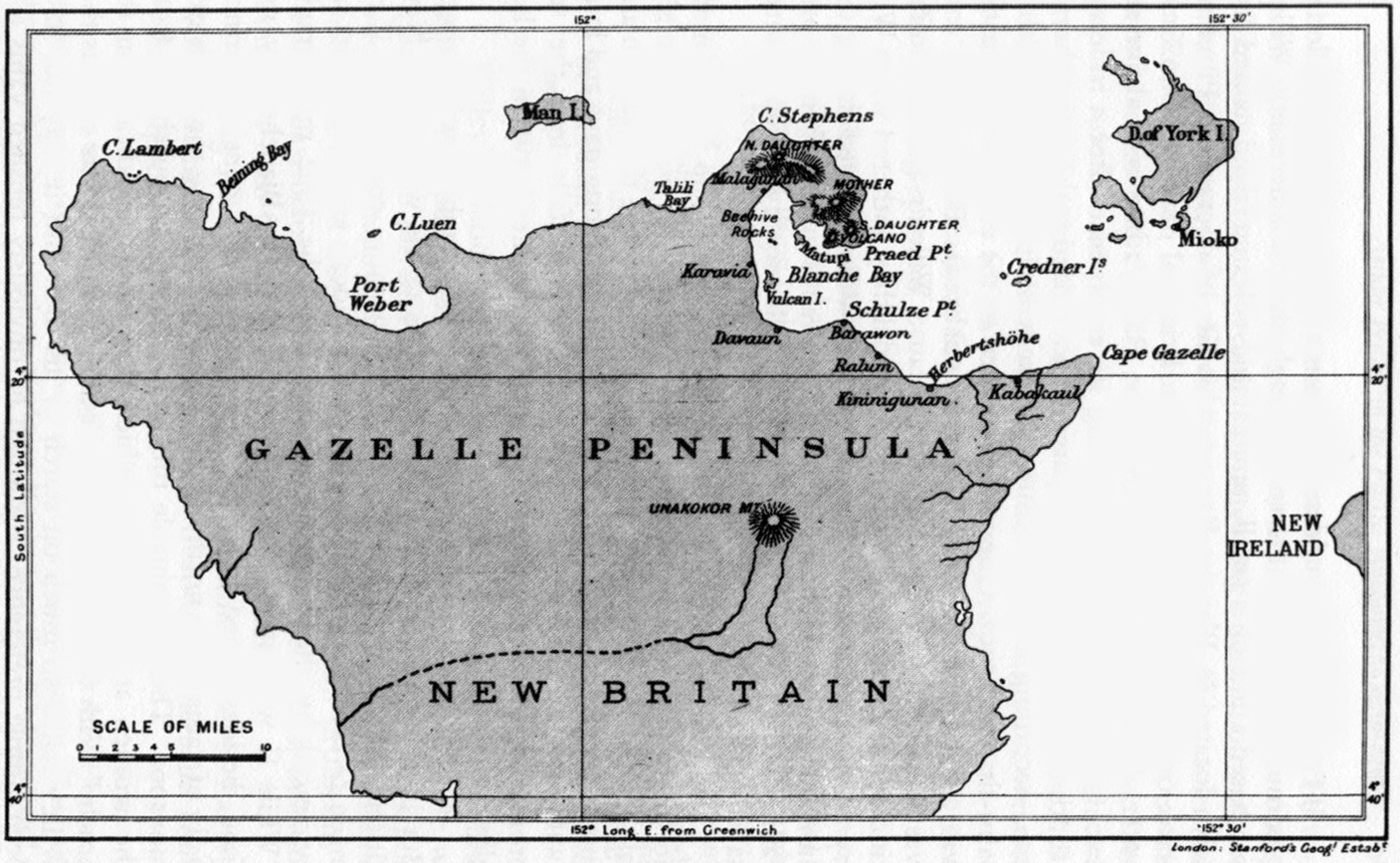
Map of Gazelle Peninsula, 1912

Map of New Guinea, Papuan Archipelgao, 1895

The Gazelle Peninsula is a large peninsula in northeastern East New Britain, Papua New Guinea located on the island of New Britain within the Bismarck Archipelago, situated in the southwestern Pacific Ocean. The Rabaul caldera is located on the northern tip of the peninsula. Upon the Gazelle Peninsula are the Baining Mountains, of which the highest point is Mount Sinewit at 2,063 m (6,768 ft). The Gazelle Peninsula houses Vulcan Crater and Mount Tavurvur, both of which conducted volcanic activity in the 20th and 21st centuries and have provided extremely fertile soils. The body of the Gazelle Peninsula is about 80 km (50 mi). The southern isthmus upon which the Gazelle Peninsula is connected to the main body of East New Britain is reduced to about 32 km (20 mi).

== History ==
The Tolai people of the peninsula probably colonised the peninsula from New Ireland not long before German arrival, although it is likely the area had earlier inhabitants.

The peninsula was named by Prussian explorer Georg von Schleinitz after his ship, SMS Gazelle.

=== 1884-1909 ===
1884: German forces seized territories of what is known (as of April 22, 2019) as German New Guinea and New Britain. 1899: Until this point the German New Guinea Company controlled these territories, then control was relinquished to the Imperial Government. 1909: Administrative headquarters of the Imperial Government in Papua New Guinea were relocated to Rabaul.

=== 1914-1937 ===
1914: Australian forces seized and controlled Papua New Guinea. 1921: Australia was mandated Papua New Guinea by the League of Nations. 1937: Vulcan and Tavurvur erupted, resulting in the destruction of Rabaul.

=== 1941-1966 ===
1941: Suspension of Australia's mandated Papua New Guinea was absolved when Japan seized control of Rabaul until 1945. 1946: Trusteeship of Papua New Guinea was awarded to Australia by the United Nations General Assembly. 1966: New Britain was divided into West New Britain and East New Britain. Rabaul remained as the headquarters of East New Britain, Kokopo became the capital of East New Britain, and Lassul Bay became a significant point of interest in the administration of East New Britain.

== Culture ==
The indigenous people of the Gazelle Peninsula are mostly concentrated within the Rabaul caldera, particularly the town of Rabaul.

Ethnically the people are typically of Melanesian descent and are referred to as Tolai by title of government. A second and less common indigenous people referred to as Baining, are semi-nomadic and tend to live in the Baining Mountains. They are distinct from the Tolai's Melanesian ethnicity. The Tolai are regarded as being the most successful people of Papua New Guinea; defined by wealth, sophistication, adaptation to modern culture, and instinct for trade.

In Tolai society, currency is used in similar fashion to coin via the medium known as tambu, a shell. Tambu can be bound together as coils to form alternative values and may be used to purchase goods in the Gazelle Peninsula. Marriage for Tolai is typically handled in economic fashion between two groups known as moieties and the son of one family is responsible for paying the bride-price in tambu to the family of the daughter. Marriage of two people within the same moiety is not allowed and the bride-price is generally determined by family status and wealth of the daughter.

== Administrative divisions ==
Administratively, the peninsula falls under Gazelle District in East New Britain Province. The district comprises the following local-level governments.

- Central Gazelle Rural
- Inland Baining Rural
- Lassul Baining Rural
- Livuan-Reimber Rural
- Vunadidir-Toma Rural

== Villages ==
- Mondrabet
- Vunakapeake
