= Lassul Baining Rural LLG =

Local-level government in Papua New Guinea

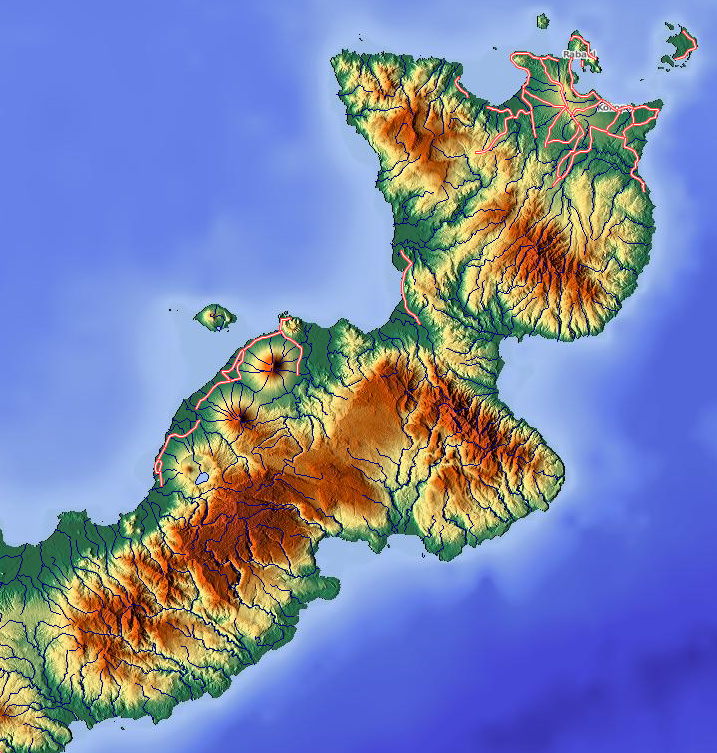
- Location within Papua New Guinea
- Coordinates: 4.227408°S 151.691376°E
- Country: Papua New Guinea
- Province: East New Britain Province
- Time zone: UTC+10 (AEST)

Lassul Baining Rural LLG is a local-level government (LLG) of East New Britain Province, Papua New Guinea.

== Wards ==
- 01. Poniar/Kanako
- 02. Mobilum
- 03. Takis
- 04. Nangasn
- 05. Traiwara
- 06. Lassul
- 07. Puktas
- 08. Karo
- 09. Matanakunai
- 10. Mandrambit (Simbali language speakers)
- 11. Wilambemki/Poiniara
- 12. Panarupkap
- 13. Laan
- 14. Yalom
- 15. Komgi
- 16. Naviu/Mamapit
- 17. Open Bay Timbers
- 18. Walmetki (Qaqet speakers)
- 19. Kolopom Settlement
- 20. Warakindam
- 21. Morokindam
- 22. Mobisberg Plantation
