= Livuan/Reimber Rural LLG =

Local-level government in Papua New Guinea

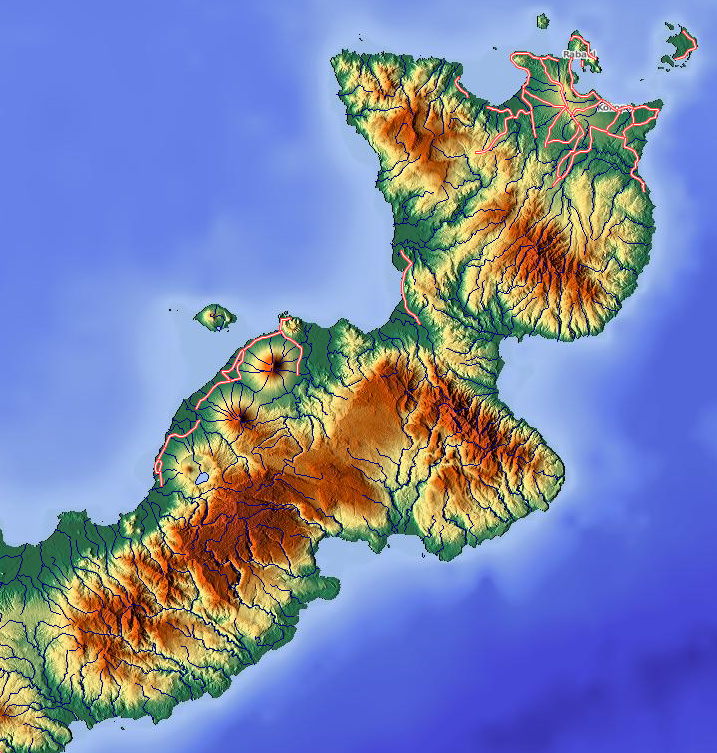
- Location within Papua New Guinea
- Coordinates: 4.249141°S 152.089785°E
- Country: Papua New Guinea
- Province: East New Britain Province
- Time zone: UTC+10 (AEST)

Livuan/Reimber Rural LLG is a local-level government (LLG) of East New Britain Province, Papua New Guinea.

== Wards ==
- 01. Rababat
- 02. Vunairoto
- 03. Kabakada
- 04. Nabata
- 05. Toboina
- 06. Raluan No.3
- 07. Putanagororoi
- 08. Vunalir
- 09. Ratongor
- 10. Vunadavai
- 11. Lungalunga
- 12. Mei-Livuan
- 13. Volavolo
- 14. Kuraip
- 15. Vunalaka
- 16. Vunakalkalulu
- 17. Taranga
- 18. Raburbur
- 19. Rakotop
- 20. Ramalmal
- 21. Vunailaiting
- 22. Vunakainalama
- 23. Towaleka
- 24. Ramale
- 25. Kikitabu
- 26. Vunaulaiting
- 27. Totovel
- 28. Rakada
- 29. Vunapaka
