= Taulil–Butam languages =

Language family in Papua New Guinea

Taulil–Butam
- Geographic distribution: East New Britain Province, Papua New Guinea
- Linguistic classification: East New Britain?: Taulil–Butam
- Subdivisions: Taulil; Butam

Language codes
- Glottolog: taul1250

The Taulil–Butam or Butam–Taulil languages are a small language family spoken in East New Britain Province, Papua New Guinea. They may be related to the Baining languages. Speakers consistently report that their ancestors came from New Ireland.

== Classification ==
The languages are:

- Taulil
- Butam (extinct)

The languages are not close but are clearly related. They are classified with the Baining languages in an East New Britain family by Ross (2001, 2005), based on similarities in their pronominal paradigms, but so far no other work has been done to support such a connection. The Austronesian impact on the languages, or at least on Taulil, is small.

== See also ==
- Baining languages
- Papuan languages
