= Inland Baining Rural LLG =

Local-level government in Papua New Guinea

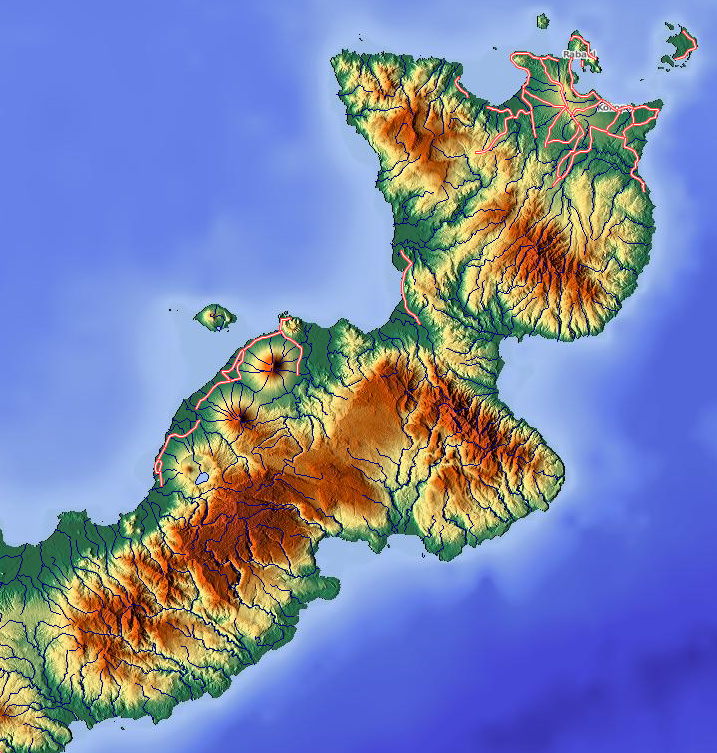
- Location within Papua New Guinea
- Coordinates: 4.379391°S 151.969689°E
- Country: Papua New Guinea
- Province: East New Britain Province
- Time zone: UTC+10 (AEST)

Inland Baining Rural LLG is a local-level government (LLG) located in the Baining Mountains of East New Britain Province, Papua New Guinea.

== Wards ==
- 01. Alakasam
- 02. Lamarain
- 03. Raunsepna (Qaqet speakers)
- 04. Yayami
- 05. Malasaet
- 06. Burit
- 07. Manapki
- 08. Liaga
- 09. Kereba
- 10. Vudal
- 11. Vunapalading No.1
- 12. Vunapalading No.2
- 13. Rangulit
- 14. Lamarainam
- 15. Mandressem Sett
- 16. Lulit
- 17. Radingi
- 18. Kamanakam (Qaqet speakers)
- 19. Ragaga
- 20. Rhungagi
- 22. Kadaulung No.2 (Taulil language speakers)
- 23. Vungi
- 24. Gaulim
- 25. Kainagunan
- 26. Ivere (Kairak language speakers)
- 27. Malabonga (Kairak language speakers)
