= Central Gazelle Rural LLG =

Local-level government in Papua New Guinea

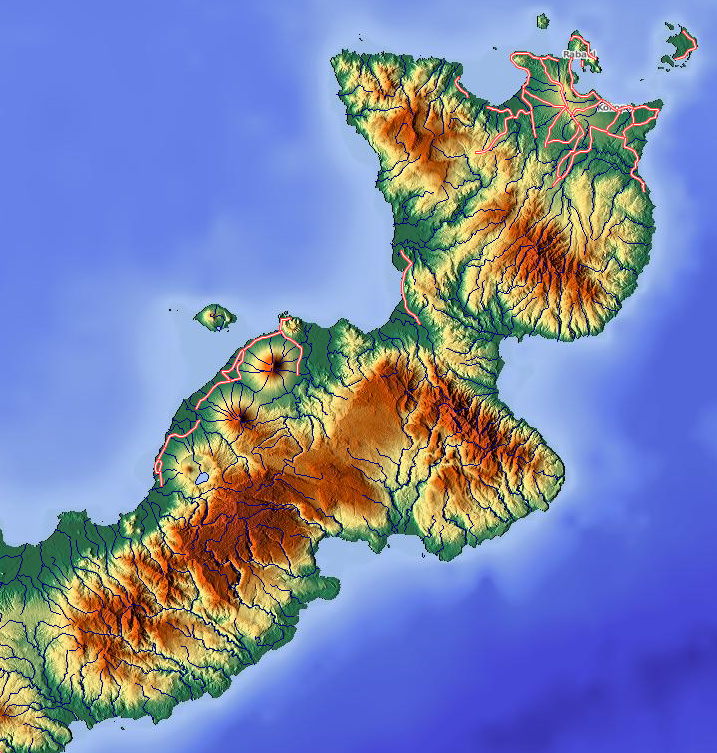
- Location within Papua New Guinea
- Coordinates: 4.34921°S 152.041466°E
- Country: Papua New Guinea
- Province: East New Britain Province
- Time zone: UTC+10 (AEST)

Central Gazelle Rural LLG is a local-level government (LLG) of East New Britain Province, Papua New Guinea.

== Wards ==
- 01. Napapar No.1
- 02. Napapar No.2
- 03. Napapar No.3
- 04. Napapar No. 4
- 05. Napapar No. 5
- 06. Vunagogo
- 07. Takekel
- 08. Kadakada
- 09. Rakunai
- 10. Latlat
- 11. Navunaram
- 12. Tavui-Liu
- 13. Malmaluan
- 14. Karavia No.I
- 15. Karavia No.2
- 16. Tavilo Settlement
- 17. Talakua
- 18. Kerevat Township
- 19. Tinganagalip
- 82. Kerevat Urban
