= Vunadidir/Toma Rural LLG =

Local-level government in Papua New Guinea

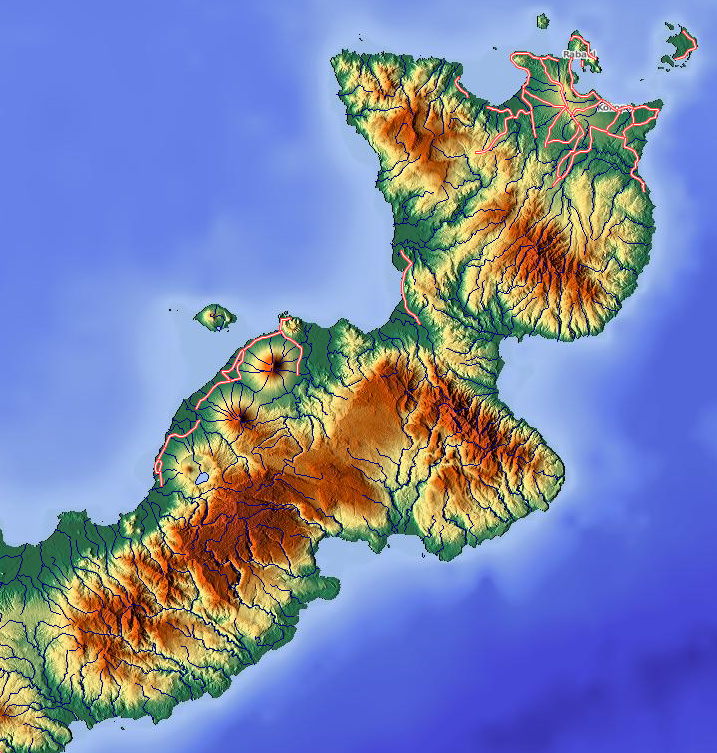
- Location within Papua New Guinea
- Coordinates: 4.354906°S 152.144099°E
- Country: Papua New Guinea
- Province: East New Britain Province
- Time zone: UTC+10 (AEST)

Vunadidir/Toma Rural LLG is a local-level government (LLG) of East New Britain Province, Papua New Guinea.

== Wards ==
- 02. Rabagi No.1
- 03. Rabagi No.2
- 05. Rapitok No.1
- 06. Rapitok No.2
- 07. Rapitok No.3
- 08. Rapitok No.4
- 09. Ratavul
- 10. Vunakabi
- 11. Tanaka
- 12. Taulil No.1 (Taulil language speakers)
- 13. Taulil No.2 (Taulil language speakers)
- 14. Vunadidir
- 15. Bitakapuk No.1
- 16. Bitakapuk No.2
- 17. Tagitagi No.1
- 18. Tagitagi No.2
- 19. Wariki No.1
- 20. Wariki No.2
- 21. Wariki No.3
- 22. Wariki No.4
- 23. Viviran No.1
- 24. Viviran No.2
- 25. Vunakaur
- 26. Baie
- 27. Papalaba
- 28. Vunararere
- 29. Tamanairik No.1
- 30. Tamanairik No.2
- 31. Rabata
- 32. Gunanur-Gbone
- 33. Raim
- 34. Rapitok

== See also ==
- Toma, Papua New Guinea
