= Baining Mountains =

Mountain range in Papua New Guinea

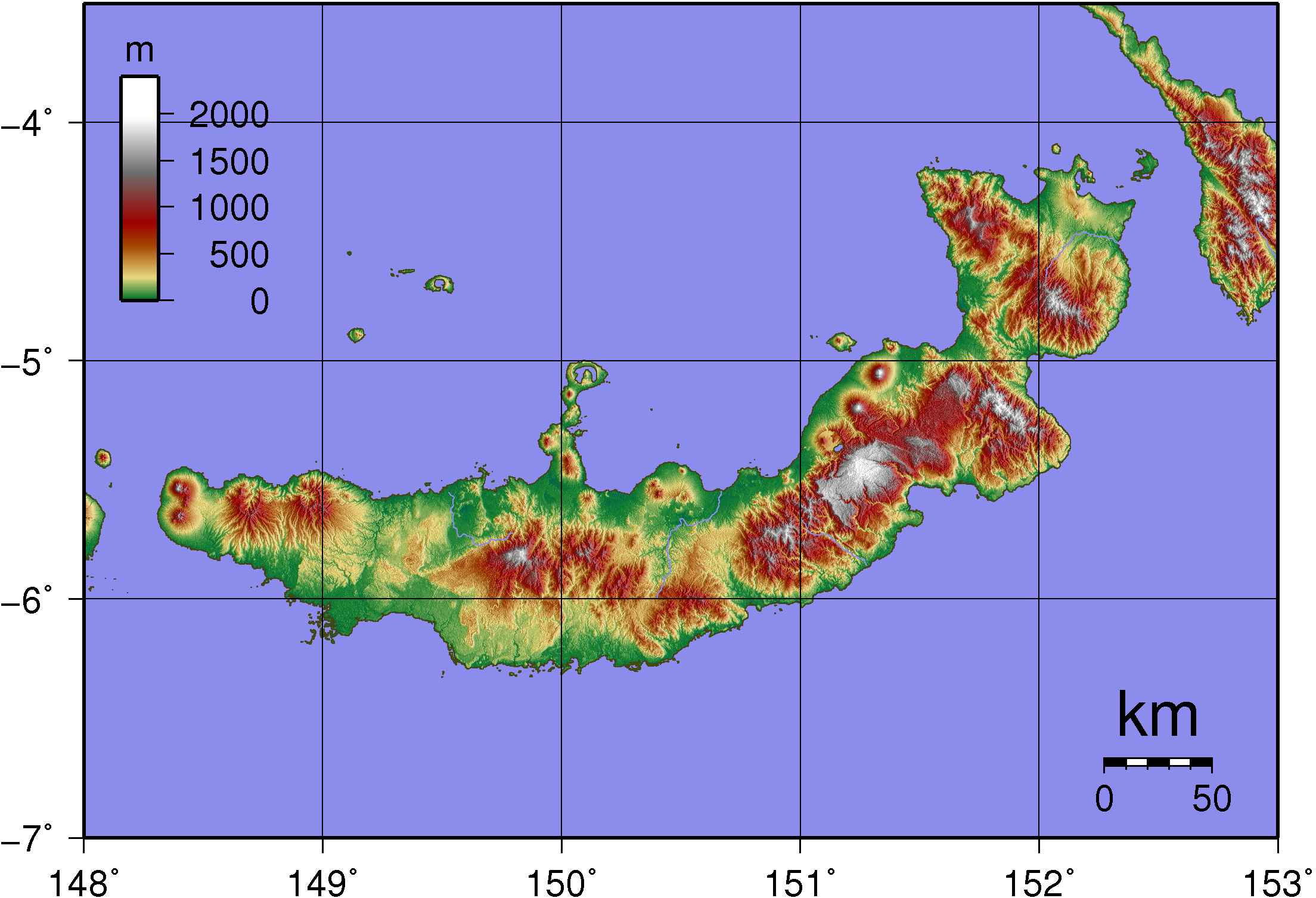
- Topography of New Britain (island in Papua New Guinea).

Geography
- Location within Papua New Guinea
- State: Papua New Guinea
- Range coordinates: 4.6666667°S 152°E

The Baining Mountains is a mountain range on the Gazelle Peninsula of New Britain island, in northern Papua New Guinea. The highest point of the range is Mount Sinewit at 2,063 metres (6,768 ft).

The Baining languages are spoken in the region.

== See also ==
- Geography of New Britain
