= Boston Review =

American political and literary magazine

- January/February 2011 issue
- Editors: Deborah Chasman; Joshua Cohen
- Categories: Politics; literature; culture
- Frequency: Quarterly
- Circulation: 62,000
- Publisher: Boston Critic, Inc.; MIT Press
- Founded: 1975
- Country: United States
- Based in: Cambridge, Massachusetts
- Language: English
- Website: bostonreview.net
- ISSN: 0734-2306

Boston Review is an American quarterly political and literary magazine. It publishes political, social, and historical analysis, literary and cultural criticism, book reviews, fiction, and poetry, both online and in print. Its signature form is a "forum", featuring a lead essay and several responses. Boston Review also publishes an imprint of books with MIT Press. The editors in chief are Deborah Chasman and political philosopher Joshua Cohen. The magazine is published by Boston Critic, Inc., a nonprofit organization. It has received praise from notable intellectuals and writers including John Kenneth Galbraith, Henry Louis Gates Jr., John Rawls, Naomi Klein, Robin Kelley, Martha Nussbaum, and Jorie Graham.

== History ==
Boston Review was founded as New Boston Review in 1975. A quarterly devoted to literature and the arts, the magazine was started by a group that included Juan Alonso, Richard Burgin, and Anita Silvey. In 1976, after the departure of some of the founding editors, the publication was co-edited by Juan Alonso and Gail Pool, and then by Gail Pool and Lorna Condon. In the late seventies, it switched from quarterly to bimonthly publication. In 1980, Arthur Rosenthal became publisher of the magazine, which was renamed Boston Review and edited by Nick Bromell. Succeeding editors were Mark Silk and then Margaret Ann Roth, who remained until 1991. During the eighties, the focus of the magazine broadened and during the nineties became more politically oriented, while maintaining a strong profile in both fiction and poetry.

Joshua Cohen replaced Roth in 1991, and has been editor since then. The full text of Boston Review has been available online since 1995. Since 1996, thirty books have been published based on articles and forums that originally appeared in the Boston Review. Since 2006, MIT Press has been publishing a "Boston Review Books" series. Deborah Chasman joined the magazine as co-editor in 2001. In 2010, Boston Review switched from black and white tabloid to a glossy, all-color format. The same year, it was the recipient of Utne Reader magazine's Utne Independent Press Award for Best Writing. The magazine switched print formats again in 2017, merging its bimonthly general interest magazine and book publications into quarterly, themed bookazines.

== Features ==
=== New Democracy Forum ===
The New Democracy Forum is a special feature of the Boston Review. It offers an arena for fostering and exploring issues regarding politics and policy. A typical forum includes a lead article by an expert and contributions from other respondents. Past forums have covered topics such as making foreign aid work, a strategy to disengage from Iraq, and new economic stress in the middle class.

=== New Fiction Forum ===
The New Fiction Forum was created as "a space for wide-ranging dialogue about contemporary fiction, a dialogue founded on a simple premise: that despite the intense commercialism of current publishing, there are original, vital novels published every season and readers to whom such narratives are of the profoundest importance". Past forums include fiction and reviews by Jhumpa Lahiri and Emily Barton.

=== Fiction contests ===
The publication sponsors well-regarded annual contests in fiction; past winners include Michael Dorris, Tom Paine, and Jacob M. Appel.

=== "Discovery" prize ===
The annual "Discovery"/Boston Review prize is given for a group of poems by a poet who has not yet published a book. Typically, the prize is awarded to four winners and four runners-up; winners read from their work at the 92nd Street Y's Unterberg Poetry Center. Begun in the 1960s as The Nation/"Discovery" prize, the Boston Review took over administration of the prize in 2007 when The Nation ended its partnership. Previous winners of the "Discovery" prize include John Ashbery, Alice James Books, Emily Hiestand, John Poch, and Martin Walls.

== Notable contributors ==
- Bruce Ackerman, professor of law
- Sadik Al-Azm, philosopher
- John Ashbery, poet
- Mary Jo Bang, poet
- Dan Beachy-Quick, poet
- Saul Bellow, novelist
- Seyla Benhabib, philosopher and political scientist
- John Berger, artist, writer, and critic
- Jagdish Bhagwati, economist
- Joseph Biden, US President
- Hans Blix, diplomat, UN weapons inspector
- Harold Bloom, literary scholar
- Roberto Bolaño, Chilean novelist and poet
- Roger Boylan, novelist and critic
- Lucie Brock-Broido, poet
- Stephanie Burt, literary scholar
- Rafael Campo, poet, doctor and writer
- Aimé Césaire, poet and politician
- Philip N. Cohen, sociologist
- Noam Chomsky, linguist and political activist
- Juan Cole, historian
- Paul Collier, economist
- Colin Dayan, professor of American studies
- Rita Dove, Poet Laureate of the United States
- Khaled Abou El Fadl, professor of law
- Owen Fiss, professor of law
- Robert Frank, photographer and filmmaker
- John Kenneth Galbraith, economist
- Akbar Ganji, journalist
- Michael Gecan, political activist
- Vivian Gornick, essayist and critic
- Jorie Graham, poet
- Lani Guinier, professor of law
- Donald Hall, Poet Laureate of the United States
- Pamela S. Karlan, professor of law
- Elias Khoury, Lebanese novelist and journalist
- Paul Krugman, economist
- Jhumpa Lahiri, novelist
- Glenn Loury, economist
- Tim Maudlin, philosopher
- Heather McHugh, poet
- Honor Moore, poet
- Luis Moreno-Ocampo, International Criminal Court chief prosecutor
- Martha Nussbaum, philosopher
- Daniel Olivas, writer, playwright and attorney
- Susan Okin, feminist political philosopher
- George Packer, journalist
- Grace Paley, writer and activist
- Gerald Peary, film critic
- Marjorie Perloff, literary scholar
- Rick Perlstein, historian and political commentator
- Robert Pinsky, Poet Laureate of the United States
- Eric Posner, professor of law
- Hilary Putnam, philosopher
- John Rawls, philosopher
- Kay Ryan, Poet Laureate of the United States
- John Roemer, economist
- Adrienne Rich, feminist poet
- Richard Rorty, philosopher
- Nir Rosen, journalist
- Saskia Sassen, sociologist
- Elaine Scarry, literary scholar
- Don Share, poet and literary critic
- Charles Simic, Poet Laureate of the United States
- Anne-Marie Slaughter, international affairs scholar
- Susan Sontag, essayist and social critic
- Eliot Spitzer, former Governor of New York
- Richard Stallman, software developer
- Marshall Steinbaum, economist
- Nicholas Stern, economist
- Alan A. Stone, professor of law, psychologist, and film critic
- Mark Strand, Poet Laureate of the United States
- Cass Sunstein, professor of law, administrator of the Office of Information and Regulatory Affairs
- Olúfẹ́mi Táíwó, philosopher
- Charles Taylor, philosopher
- Charles Tilly, sociologist
- John Updike, writer
- Hal Varian, economist
- Eliot Weinberger, essayist and translator
- Stephen Walt, international affairs scholar
- C. D. Wright, poet
- Howard Zinn, historian and social critic
- Jonathan Zittrain, professor of law

== See also ==
- List of literary magazines
