= Kokopo =

Capital of East New Britain, Papua New Guinea

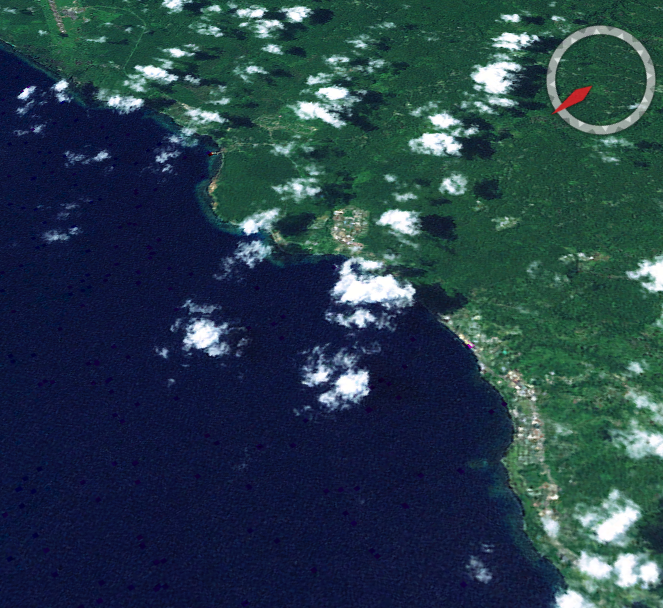
- Satellite image

- Location within New Britain and Ireland
- Coordinates: 4°21′00″S 152°16′25″E
- Country: Papua New Guinea
- Province: East New Britain
- District: Kokopo District
- LLG: Kokopo/Vunamami Urban
- Elevation: 4 m (13 ft)

Population (2000)
  - Total: 20,262
  - Rank: 8th

Languages
  - Main languages: Kuanua, Tok Pisin, English
- Time zone: UTC+10 (AEST)
- Location: 20 km (12 mi) from Rabaul
- Mean max temp: 31.0 °C (87.8 °F)
- Mean min temp: 23.3 °C (73.9 °F)
- Annual rainfall: 2,003 mm (78.86 in)
- Climate: Af

Kokopo is the capital of East New Britain Province in Papua New Guinea. It is administered under Kokopo/Vunamami Urban LLG. The capital was moved from Rabaul in 1994 when the volcanoes Tavurvur and Vulcan erupted. As a result, the population of the town increased more than sixfold from 3,150 in 1990 to 20,262 in 2000.

Kokopo was known as Herbertshöhe (Herbert's Heights), named in honour of Herbert, eldest son of German Chancellor Otto von Bismarck, during the German New Guinea administration, which controlled the area between 1884 and formally until 1919. Until 1910, it was the capital of German New Guinea.

On Sunday, March 29, 2015, a strong earthquake, of a preliminary magnitude of at least 7.5, which at that time was the largest earthquake of 2015, was recorded near Kokopo, and a tsunami warning was issued. This was surpassed a month later by the April 2015 Nepal earthquake, which measured a magnitude 7.8.

In 2015, a research and conservation project was suggested to study and protect spinner dolphins living around Kokopo beach, as this population may be threatened if construction of a new port for larger shipping lanes is initiated.

== Communication links ==
The remains of the former capital Rabaul are located some 20 km (12 mi) to the north-west of Kokopo, when using the Kokopo-Rabaul Highway. There are around 4,000 inhabitants in Rabaul, down from over 17,000 before the latest volcanic eruption.

Rabaul Airport (also called "Tokua Airport"), one of Papua New Guinea's largest domestic airports, is located a few kilometres east of Kokopo.

== Climate ==
Kokopo has a tropical rainforest climate (Köppen Af) with heavy rainfall and hot temperatures year-round.

Climate data for Kokopo
Month	Jan	Feb	Mar	Apr	May	Jun	Jul	Aug	Sep	Oct	Nov	Dec	Year
Mean daily maximum °C (°F)	30.7 (87.3)	30.8 (87.4)	30.6 (87.1)	30.6 (87.1)	30.8 (87.4)	30.6 (87.1)	29.9 (85.8)	30.1 (86.2)	31.0 (87.8)	31.2 (88.2)	31.3 (88.3)	30.8 (87.4)	30.7 (87.3)
Daily mean °C (°F)	27.0 (80.6)	27.0 (80.6)	27.0 (80.6)	26.9 (80.4)	27.2 (81.0)	27.0 (80.6)	26.5 (79.7)	26.5 (79.7)	27.1 (80.8)	27.2 (81.0)	27.4 (81.3)	27.1 (80.8)	27.0 (80.6)
Mean daily minimum °C (°F)	23.4 (74.1)	23.3 (73.9)	23.5 (74.3)	23.3 (73.9)	23.6 (74.5)	23.4 (74.1)	23.1 (73.6)	23.0 (73.4)	23.3 (73.9)	23.3 (73.9)	23.5 (74.3)	23.4 (74.1)	23.3 (74.0)
Average rainfall mm (inches)	185 (7.3)	188 (7.4)	209 (8.2)	191 (7.5)	124 (4.9)	139 (5.5)	167 (6.6)	154 (6.1)	130 (5.1)	127 (5.0)	156 (6.1)	217 (8.5)	1,987 (78.2)

== PNG Hunters ==
The Papua New Guinea Hunters (PNG Hunters) are a rugby league football club based in Kokopo. They were established in 2013 and currently compete in the QRL's Intrust Super Cup. The Hunters' home ground is Kalabond Oval in Kokopo and their team colours are red, black and gold.
