= Ura language (Papua New Guinea) =

Baining language spoken in Papua New Guinea

Ura
- Region: New Britain
- Native speakers: (1,900 cited 1991)
- Language family: Baining: Ura

Language codes
- ISO 639-3: uro
- Glottolog: urap1240
- ELP: Ura (Papua New Guinea)

Ura (Uramät) is a Papuan language spoken in East New Britain Province on the island of New Britain, Papua New Guinea. Uramät is the autonym of the people.

== Names ==
Ura is alternatively known as Uramet, Uramit, Uramot, Uramät, Auramot and Neu-Pommern.

== Phonology ==
=== Consonants ===
The following table shows Ura's consonantal phonemes:

	Bilabial		Dental		Alveolar	Palatal		Velar	
Nasal	m		n			ɲ		ŋ	
Plosive	p	b	t	d		c	ɟ	k	ɡ
Fricative					s				
Tap					ɾ				
Lateral approximant					l				

=== Vowels ===
The following table shows Ura's vowel phonemes:

	Front	Central	Back
Close	i		u
Close-mid	e		
Mid		ə	
Open-mid			ɔ
Open		a	
