= Taulil language =

East New Britain language of Papua New Guinea

Taulil
- Region: New Britain
- Native speakers: 2,000 (2012)
- Language family: East New Britain: Taulil–Butam; Taulil

Language codes
- ISO 639-3: tuh
- Glottolog: taul1251
- ELP: Taulil
- Taulil is classified as Vulnerable by the UNESCO Atlas of the World's Languages in Danger.

Taulil is a Papuan language spoken in East New Britain Province on the island of New Britain, Papua New Guinea.

It is spoken in Kadaulung village of (4.452603°S 152.118398°E) of Inland Baining Rural LLG, and in Taulil 1 (4.413301°S 152.092147°E) and Taulil 2 (4.419937°S 152.087372°E) villages of Vunadidir/Toma Rural LLG.

Butam (now extinct) is related. Like the Butam, the Taulil people trace their ancestry to New Ireland.

== Phonology ==
Taulil has the following consonants:

| | Bilabial | Alveolar | Palatal | Velar |
|---|---|---|---|---|
| Plosive (voiceless) | p | t | | k |
| Plosive (voiced) | b | d | | ɡ |
| Nasal | m | n | | ŋ |
| Tap/Flap | | ɾ | | |
| Fricative | β | | | |
| Approximant | | | j | |
| Lateral approximant | | l | | |
