= Kairak language =

Papuan language of New Britain, PNG

Kairak
- Region: New Britain
- Native speakers: 900 (2012)
- Language family: Baining: Kairak

Language codes
- ISO 639-3: ckr
- Glottolog: kair1267

Kairak is a Papuan language spoken in East New Britain Province on the island of New Britain, Papua New Guinea. It is spoken in Ivere (4.443496°S 152.079799°E) and Malabunga (4.435562°S 152.082349°E) villages of Inland Baining Rural LLG.
