= Baining languages =

Papuan language family

Baining
- Geographic distribution: Gazelle Peninsula, New Britain
- Ethnicity: Baining people
- Linguistic classification: East New Britain: Baining

Language codes
- Glottolog: bain1263

The Baining languages are a small language family spoken by the Baining people on the Gazelle Peninsula of New Britain in Papua New Guinea. They appear to be related to the neighboring Taulil–Butam languages, which diffused from New Ireland.

== Languages ==
The languages are:

- Mali (2,200 speakers)
- Qaqet (6,400 speakers)
- Kairak (900 speakers)
- Simbali (450 speakers)
- Ura (1,900 speakers)

Extinct Makolkol neighbored the (other) Baining languages to their southwest but is unattested.

== Vocabulary comparison ==
The following basic vocabulary words are from SIL field notes (1970, 1971, 1975), as cited in the Trans-New Guinea database.

The words cited constitute translation equivalents, whether they are cognate (e.g. sʌdᶺm, asdɛmgi for “ear”) or not (e.g. tʌƀəřʌk, it for “louse”).

gloss	Mali (Makunga dialect)	Mali (Arambum dialect)	Qaget	Ura
head	aŋʌpʌski	u^{w}ʌski	niŋaǥa; ʌ niŋʌg̶ʌ	amʌ niŋʌɣi; auwʌski; ʌmʌ niŋʌɣɩ
hair	aɣʌsɛŋ	ǥʌsɛŋ	aǥsiŋ; ʌg̶asiŋ	aɣʌsɛŋ; kʌsiŋ; kʌsɩŋ
ear	sʌdᶺm	asdɛmgi	as^{n}dəmgi; s^{ə}d^{ə}mki	asdʌmgi; dʌsdəmgɩ; dʌsdəmgi
eye	saǥɔŋ	saǥoŋ	ʌ rʌsʌkŋiʌm; saknaǥa	asauɣoŋ; ʌ̂ sʌǥon; ʌ sʌǥoŋ
nose	kulimki	ulɩmgi	ǥəřɩmki; ʌ rʌg̶ʌrimgi	awʌlyʌmgi; ʌ ǥulimgɩ; ʌ ǥulimgi
tooth	alkɛŋ	ǥɛŋ	ařkiŋ; ařkingi	atkiŋgi; ʌ ǥʌřʌ; naeyɛŋ; næyɛŋ
tongue	aǥulbiŋka	ǥɔbɩnga	ǥalbi^{n}ka; og̶lbinga	aɣuebunga; duɛbingʌ
leg	alaǥar; s^{ə}lʌpiřom	aǥař	ʌ laiŋyat; ɩla^{i}ŋ	ʌgʌřʌ
louse	tʌƀ^{ə}řʌk	it	ᶩa^{i}t; ʌ ɛɛtki	məa^{ι}t; məa^{i}t; ɩr̰aɩt
dog	paimka	imga	daŋka; ʌ dʌŋgʌ	imga; mɛmgʌ
pig	ƀlam; pᶺlᶺmka^{h}	ƀɛmga^{h}	ƀiləmgʌ; ƀlam	ƀɩɛmgʌ; ƀiɛmgʌ; wemga
bird	isᶺmka	i sʌmga	wa^{i}ṱki; ʌ wʌitka	ɛɛ'sumgʌ; ɛɛsumgʌ; isʌmga
egg	pa·lo	la	luaǥa; ʌ luʌg̶ʌ	duřaiṱ; duřa^{ι}t̯; luaɣa
blood	a^{m}bias	ab^{i}ʌska	ʌg̶ʌřʌkʌ; ǥ^{ə}ř^{ə}ka	a biaska; biʌskʌ
bone	s^{ə}lʌp	atlɨp	lan; sləpki	a Lləp; ʌ Lləp; o slʌpki
skin	kᶺ^{n}dʌ^{n}ki	ŋᶺndᶺŋ	ǥət·dinki; ʌrʌgʌtdəŋit	aslɩɣɩge; ʌ sliyɩgɛ; ʌ sliyigɛ
breast	kʌmkʌ	ǥumuk^{h}	ǥomʌk; og̶əmək	at gəmuk; atkʌmuk
tree	amʌŋka	ŋumuŋ	mʌŋk^{h}a; munkʌ	ʌ muŋgʌ; ŋʌmuga
man	aroǥa; umᶺska	umʌska	ǥ^{w}atka; ʌ g̶wʌtkʌ	gamoɛɣa; gʌmuɛgʌ
woman	lɛƀɔpki	aƀop^{ə}kin	nanki; ʌ nʌngi	ɛwəpkɩ; ɛwəpki; Ewopki
sun	kunʌŋka	^{w}unɛŋga	ʌ niřag̶a; niřaǥa; nɩlaǥa	ɣunʌga; wunʌgʌ
moon	ayaƀunki	'aǥɔngi	yaǥunki; ʌ yɔg̶ungi	yaǥunǥɩ; yaɣungi; yʌǥungi
water	ařɛŋki	řiŋgi	ǥřapki; ʌ kʌinʌg̶i	mʌřiŋgi; mʌřɩŋgɩ; rigi
fire	a mundʌm	mudʌmbʌs	altiŋki; ʌltiŋgi	mundʌbʌs; mundʌm
stone	dulki	diǥa	ʌ dulkʌ; dulka	duɩɣa; mʌ duɩ; mʌ dui
road, path	a^{i}ska^{h}	iska^{h}	aiskʌ; a^{i}ska	iska; mʌiskʌ; mʌɩskʌ
name	aŋařɛpki	ŋʌrɩpki^{h}	d^{y}iʌringi namgi; řɨnki	diŋyiřipki; diŋyɩrɩpkɩ; ŋʌr̰iþki
eat	katɨs	katɨs	ka tɨs; kʌ t^{ə}s	ɣat tʌs; ka ts; kʌ t^{ə}s
one	asʌŋgʌk	sɛgɨk^{h}	ǥ^{w}anaska; og̶unʌskʌ	sɩgʌk; sʌgʌk; sigʌk
two	a^{un}dom	udion	ǥ^{w}anas^{i}am; og̶unʌsiʌm	undiom; undɩom
