= Makolkol language =

Extinct Papuan language

Makolkol
- Native to: Papua New Guinea
- Region: New Britain
- Native speakers: 7 in 1988. May still be alive (2016)
- Language family: unclassified

Language codes
- ISO 639-3: zmh
- Glottolog: mako1250
- ELP: Makolkol

Makolkol is a possible Papuan language formerly spoken on the Gazelle Peninsula of East New Britain Province on the island of New Britain, Papua New Guinea. Stebbins (2010) reports it is unattested. Palmer (2018) treats it as unclassified.

It is not known if it was related to the neighboring Baining languages.

Rosensteel (1988) contains a 174-word list of Makolkol.

== Sociolinguistic situation ==
Makolkol was spoken only in the village of Gunapeo. Speakers were shifting to Tok Pisin and Meramera. Rosensteel (1988) reported that out of a total population of about 35 ethnic people, there were 7 elderly fluent speakers.
