= Mali language =

Language spoken in Papua New Guinea

Mali
- Gaktai
- Region: New Britain
- Native speakers: (2,200 cited 1988)
- Language family: Baining: Mali

Language codes
- ISO 639-3: gcc
- Glottolog: mali1284
- Coordinates: 4.970382°S 152.043503°E

Mali or Gaktai is a Papuan language spoken in East New Britain Province on the island of New Britain, Papua New Guinea.

== Dialects ==
There are two dialects of Mali:

- Arongda dialect (standard dialect; with two groups), spoken in the mountains, including in Marunga village (4.970382°S 152.043503°E) in Sinivit Rural LLG, East New Britain Province
- Abilta dialect, spoken along the coast

== Phonology ==
The phonology of the Mali language:

=== Consonants ===
| | | Labial | Alveolar | Palatal | Velar |
|---|---|---|---|---|---|
| Plosive | voiceless | p | t | | k |
| Plosive | prenasal | ᵐb | ⁿd | | ᵑɡ |
| Fricative | | β | s | | |
| Nasal | | m | n | | ŋ |
| Approximant | | w | ɹ | j | ɰ |
| Lateral | | | l | | |
| Rhotic | | | r | | |

=== Vowels ===
| | Front | Central | Back |
|---|---|---|---|
| High | i | | u |
| Mid | e | ə | o |
| Low | | a | |

== Noun classes ==
Mali makes use of noun classes. Below are some Mali noun class paradigms, using the noun root amēng ‘tree’ as an example:

| Noun class | Singular | Dual | Plural | Gloss |
|---|---|---|---|---|
| Masculine (m) | amēng-ka | amēng-iom | amēng | ‘slender tree’ |
| Feminine (f) | amēng-ki | amēng-vem | amēng | ‘large full grown tree’ |
| Diminutive (dim) | amēng-ini | amēng-ithom | amēng-ithong | ‘stick’ |
| Reduced (rcd) | amēng-ēm | amēng-vam | amēng-vap | ‘tree stump’ |
| Flat (flat) | ― | ― | ― | ― |
| Excised (exc) | amēng-igl | amēng-iglem | amēng-igleng | ‘plank’ |
| Long (long) | amēng-vēt | amēng-imelēm | amēng-imelēk | ‘pole’ |
| Extended (ext) | amēng-ia | amēng-inēm | amēng-inēk | ‘large log’ |
| Count neutral (cn) | amēng | | | ‘wood or trees’ |

== Bibliography ==
- Stebbins, Tonya N. (2011). Mali (Baining) grammar. ANU, Canberra: Pacific Linguistics. p. 415. ISBN 9780858836297.
- Stebbins, Tonya N.; Tayul, Julius (2012). Mali (Baining) dictionary: Mali-Baining Amēthamon Angētha Thēvaik. Studies in the Languages of Island Melanesia. Canberra: Asia-Pacific Linguistics. p. 455. hdl:1885/9273. ISBN 9781922185006.
