= Simbali language =

Papuan language of New Britain, PNG

Simbali
- Native to: Papua New Guinea
- Region: New Britain
- Native speakers: 450 (2012)
- Language family: Baining: Simbali

Language codes
- ISO 639-3: smg
- Glottolog: simb1259

Simbali is a poorly-documented Baining language spoken in the southern Gazelle Peninsula on New Britain, Papua New Guinea.

== Names ==
Simbali is alternatively known as Asimbali or Neu-Pommern.

== Location ==
In 2012, the language was described as being strongest in the villages of Alingirka, Avungi (4.755811°S 151.815774°E) and Kavudemki (4.928481°S 151.960992°E).

== Status ==
A 2012 SIL report described the language as vigorous and used across all ages, with speakers having a strong ethno-linguistic identity and a desire to maintain the language. This is seemingly no longer true; the Simbali have since lost most of their land to palm oil and logging companies, a large risk factor for language death.
