= New Britain =

Island in Papua New Guinea

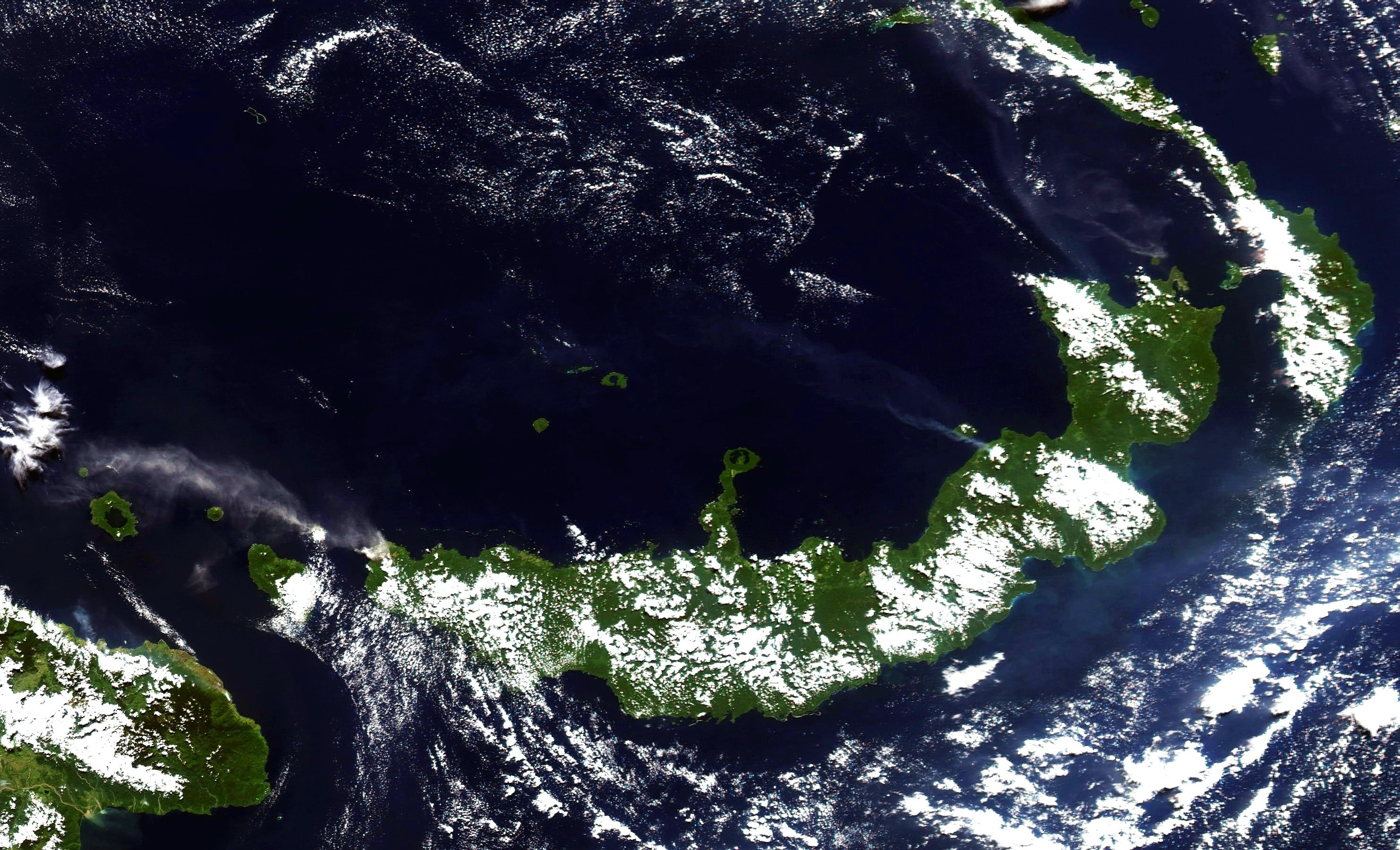
- New Britain from space, June 2005. Clearly visible are ash plumes from Langila and Ulawun volcanoes

- Location within Papua New Guinea

Geography
- Coordinates: 5°45′S 150°36′E
- Archipelago: Bismarck Archipelago
- Area: 35,144.6 km^{2} (13,569.4 sq mi)
- Area rank: 38th
- Length: 520 km (323 mi)
- Width: 146 km (90.7 mi)
- Highest elevation: 2,334 m (7657 ft)
- Highest point: Mount Ulawun

Administration
- Papua New Guinea
- Provinces: East New Britain; West New Britain

Demographics
- Population: 513,926 (2011)
- Pop. density: 14.07/km^{2} (36.44/sq mi)
- Ethnic groups: Papuans and Austronesians

New Britain (Tok Pisin: Niu Briten) is the largest island in the Bismarck Archipelago, part of the Islands Region of Papua New Guinea. It is separated from New Guinea by a northwest corner of the Solomon Sea (or with an island hop of Umboi the Dampier and Vitiaz Straits) and from New Ireland by St. George's Channel. The main towns of New Britain are Rabaul, Kokopo, and Kimbe. The island is roughly the size of Taiwan.

When the island was part of German New Guinea, its name was Neupommern ("New Pomerania"). In common with most of the Bismarcks it was largely formed by volcanic processes, and has active volcanoes including Ulawun (highest volcano nationally), Langila, the Garbuna Group, the Sulu Range, and the volcanoes Tavurvur and Vulcan of the Rabaul caldera. A major eruption of Tavurvur in 1994 destroyed the East New Britain provincial capital of Rabaul. Most of the town still lies under metres of ash, and the capital has been moved to nearby Kokopo.

== Geography ==
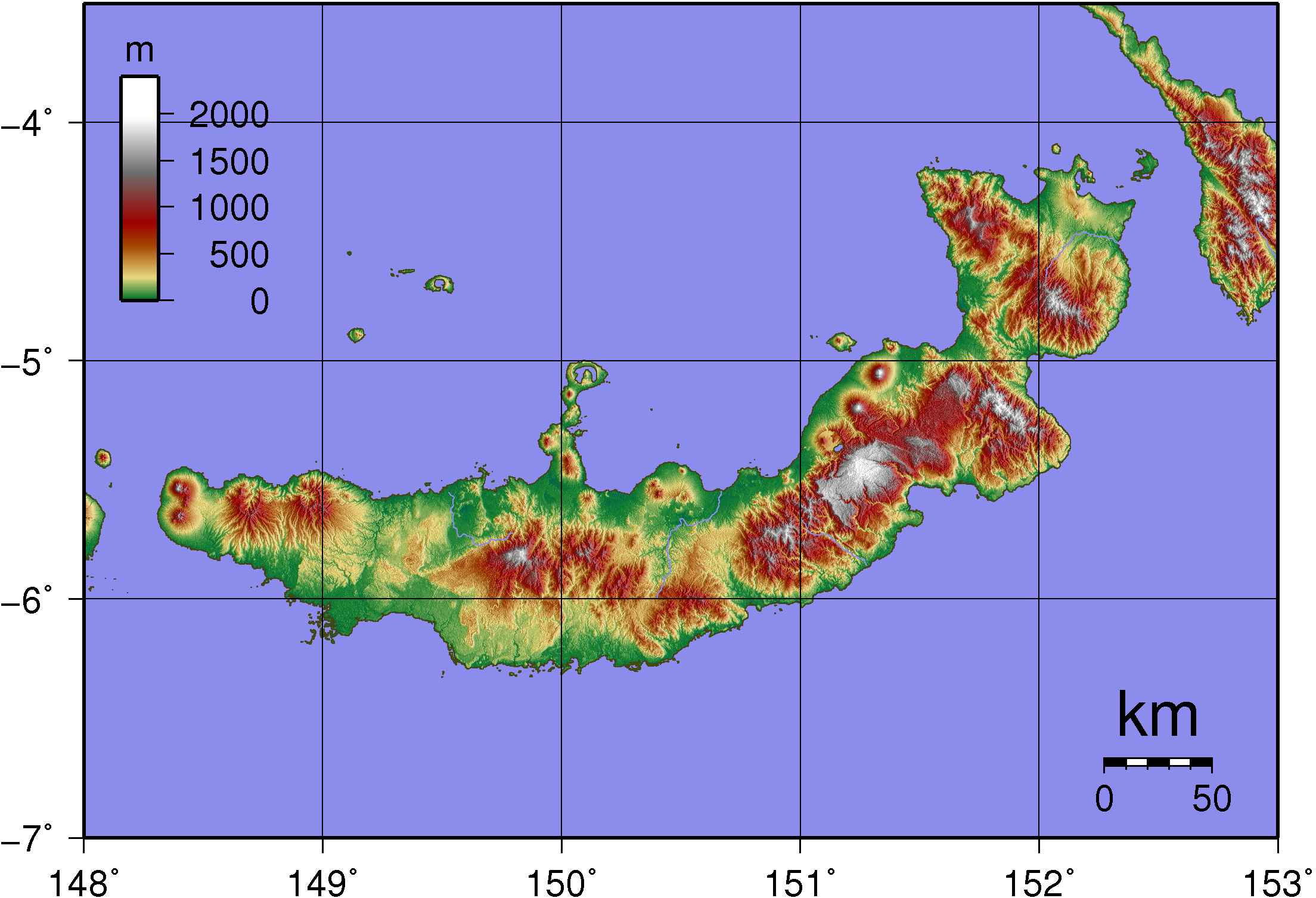
Topography of New Britain

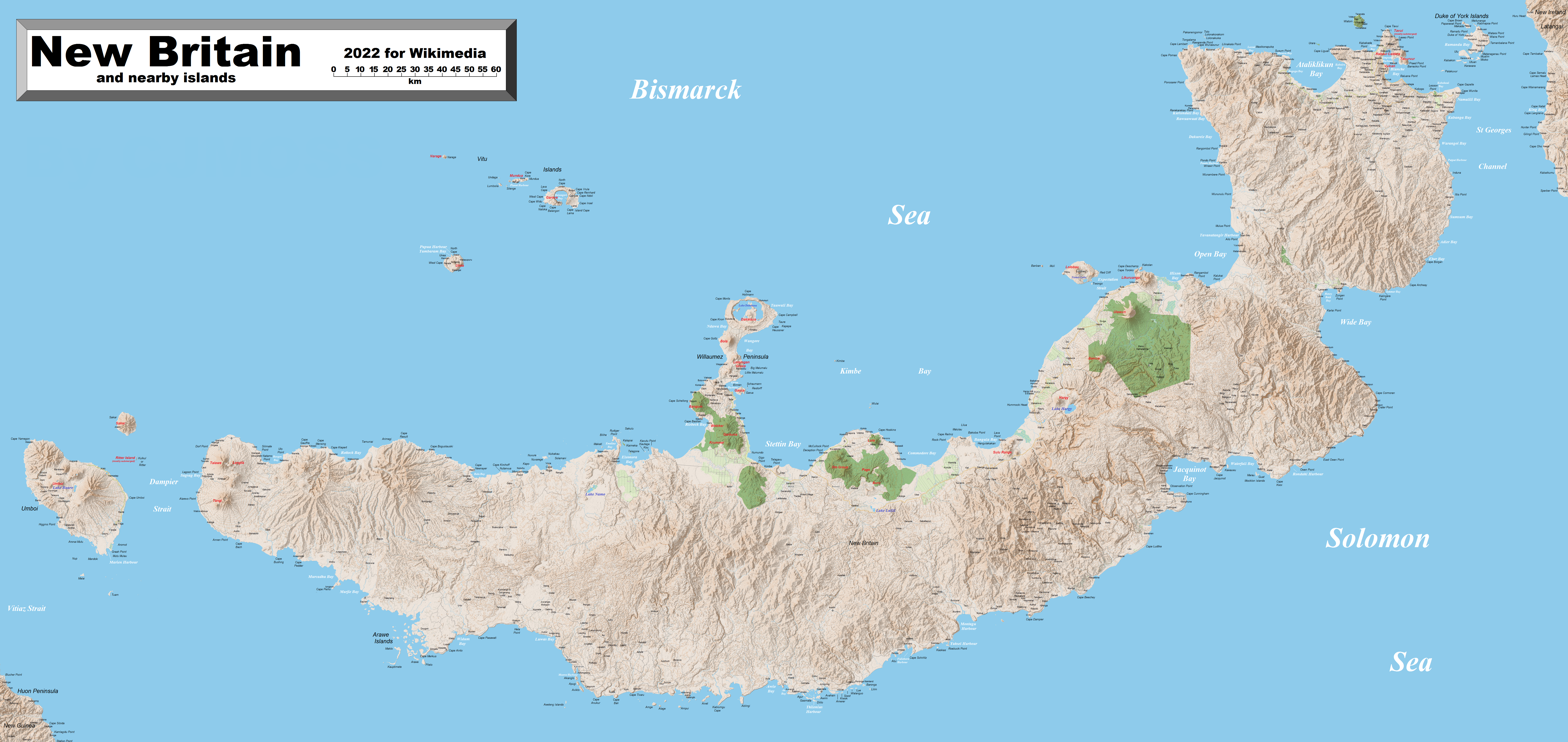
New Britain, with selected volcanoes named in red

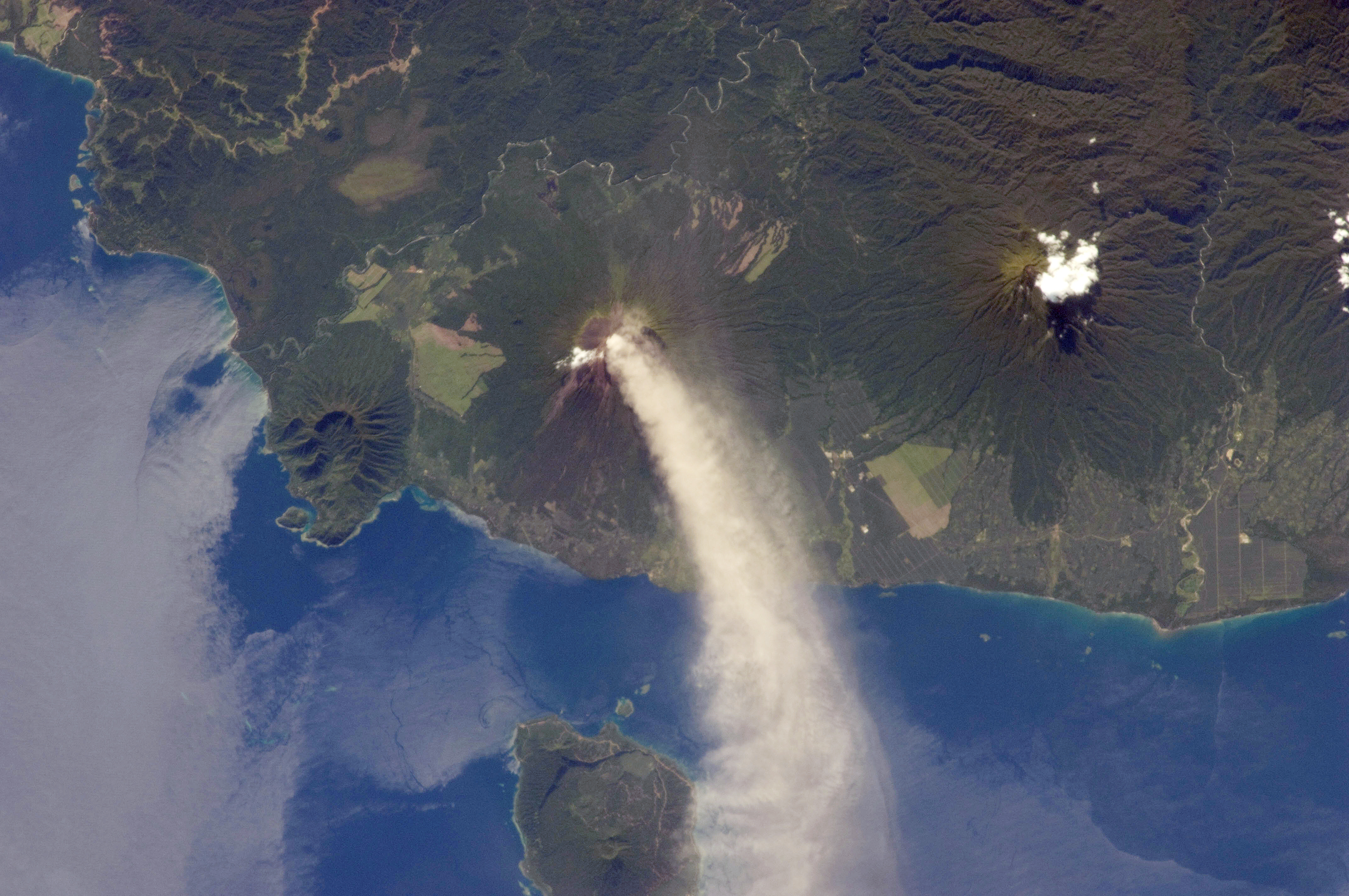
Ulawun Volcano and Lolobau Island

New Britain extends from 148°18′28″ to 152°24′15″ E longitude and from 4°08′00″ to 6°18′57″ S latitude. It is crescent-shaped, approximately 520 km (320 mi) along its southeastern coastline, and from 29 to 146 km (18 to 91 mi) wide, not including a small central peninsula. The air-line distance from west to east is 477 km (296 mi). The island is the 38th largest in the world, with an area of 35,140 km^{2} (13,570 sq mi).

Steep cliffs form some sections of the coastline; in others the mountains are further inland, and the coastal area is flat and bordered by coral reefs. The highest point, at 2,334 metres (7,657 ft), is the stratovolcano Mount Ulawun in the east. Most of the terrain is covered with tropical rainforest, and several large rivers are fed by the high rainfall.

The Nakanai Range in East New Britain is composed largely of limestone karst, which extends from the mountain peaks to the southern coast. Erosion of the porous limestone has created large sinkholes, or dolines, and extensive caves and river cave systems. The Nakanai Caves, together with two other karst regions on the New Guinea mainland, were nominated to the World Heritage Tentative List in 2007 as The Sublime Karsts of Papua New Guinea.

== Administrative divisions ==
New Britain forms part of the Islands Region, one of four regions of Papua New Guinea. It comprises the mainland of two provinces:

- East New Britain with headquarters in Kokopo (formerly in Rabaul)
- West New Britain with headquarters in Kimbe

== History ==
In research science, there is evidence with Pleistocene-era cultural deposits discovered in open-site excavations in near Yombon, which show that New Britain has been inhabited by indigenous Papuans for thousands of years, with human occupation dating back to 21,000 BC.

=== Modern history ===
==== 1700–1914 ====
William Dampier became the first known British man to visit New Britain on 27 February 1700; he dubbed the island with the Latin name Nova Britannia (lit. 'New Britain').

Whaling ships from Britain, Australia and the United States called at the island in the 19th century for food, water and wood. The first on record was the Roscoe in 1822. The last known whaling visitor was the Palmetto in 1881.

In November 1884, Germany proclaimed its protectorate over the New Britain Archipelago; the German colonial administration gave New Britain and New Ireland the names of Neupommern (or Neu-Pommern; "New Pomerania") and Neumecklenburg (or Neu-Mecklenburg; "New Mecklenburg") respectively, and the whole island group was renamed the Bismarck Archipelago. New Britain became part of German New Guinea.

In 1909, the indigenous population was estimated at 190,000; the foreign population at 773 (474 white). The expatriate population was practically confined to the northeastern Gazelle Peninsula, which included the capital, Herbertshöhe (now Kokopo). At the time 5,448 hectares (13,460 acres) had been converted to plantations, primarily growing copra, cotton, coffee and rubber. Westerners avoided exploring the interior initially, believing that the indigenous peoples were warlike and would fiercely resist intrusions.

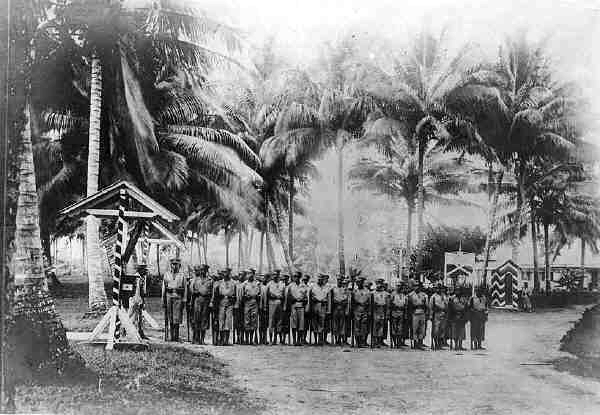
Native recruits during drill in German New Guinea, 1910

==== World War I ====
On 11 September 1914, New Britain became the site of one of the earliest battles of World War I when the Australian Naval and Military Expeditionary Force landed on the island. They quickly overwhelmed the German forces and occupied the island for the duration of the war.

==== Interwar period ====
After World War I, the Treaty of Versailles was signed in June 1919. Germany was stripped of all its possessions outside Europe. In 1920 the League of Nations included New Britain, along with the former German colony on New Guinea, in the Territory of New Guinea, a mandated territory of Australia.

==== World War II ====
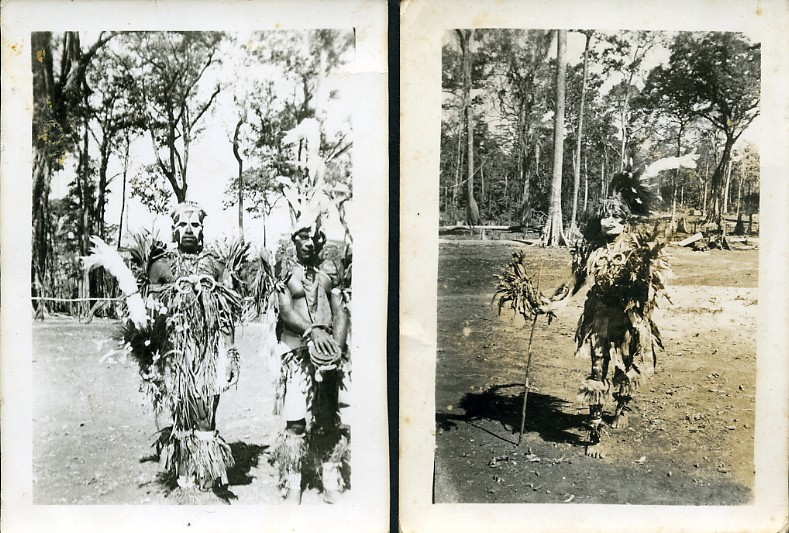
Two photographs of native New British Islanders, 1944

During World War II the Japanese attacked New Britain soon after the outbreak of hostilities in the Pacific Ocean. Strategic bases at Rabaul and Kavieng (New Ireland) were defended by a small Australian detachment, Lark Force. During January 1942, the Japanese heavily bombed Rabaul. On 23 January, Japanese marines landed by the thousands, starting the Battle of Rabaul. Two hundred and fifty civilians were evacuated from places on New Britain in March 1942, but others were captured in Rabaul when it fell. The Japanese used Rabaul as a key base until 1944; it served as the key point for the failed invasion of Port Moresby on New Guinea (May to November 1942).

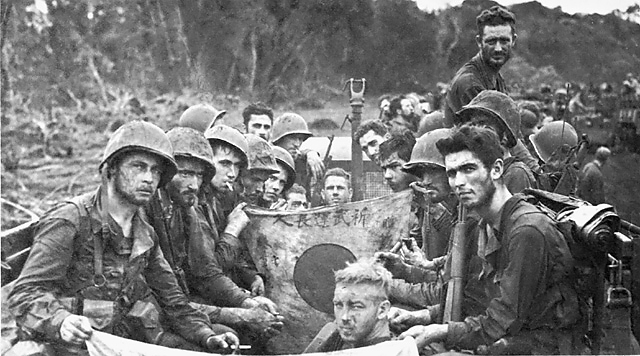
Men of the 1st Marine Division display Japanese flags captured during the Battle of Cape Gloucester.

New Britain was invaded by the U.S. 1st Marine Division in the Cape Gloucester area of the very western end of the island, and also by U.S. Army soldiers at some other coastal points. As for Cape Gloucester, with its swamps and mosquitos, the Marines said that it was "worse than Guadalcanal". They captured an airfield but accomplished little toward reducing the Japanese base at Rabaul.

The Allied plan involved bypassing Rabaul by surrounding it with air and naval bases on surrounding islands and on New Britain itself. The adjacent island of New Ireland was bypassed altogether. Much of the story from the Japanese side, especially the two suicide charges by the Baalen group, are retold in Shigeru Mizuki's Onward Towards Our Noble Deaths. The television film Sisters of War recounts experiences of Australian Army nurses and Catholic nuns during the conflict.

==== After 1945 ====
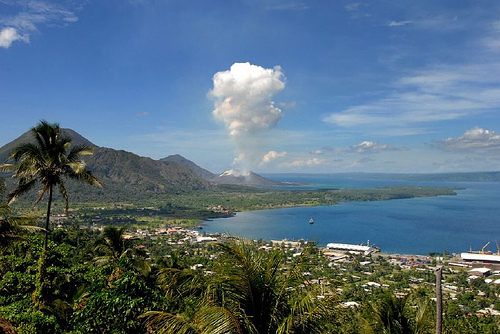
Rabaul and Tavurvur volcano

The population of the main town of Rabaul was evacuated as a result of volcanic activity in 1994 which buried the town under a thick layer of volcanic ash.

== People and culture ==
The indigenous people of New Britain fall into two main groups: the Papuans, who have inhabited the island for tens of thousands of years, and the Austronesians, who arrived around three thousand years ago. There are around ten Papuan languages spoken and about forty Austronesian languages, as well as Tok Pisin and English. The Papuan population is largely confined to the eastern third of the island and a couple of small enclaves in the central highlands. At Jacquinot Bay, in the south-east, they live beside the beach where a waterfall crashes directly into the sea.

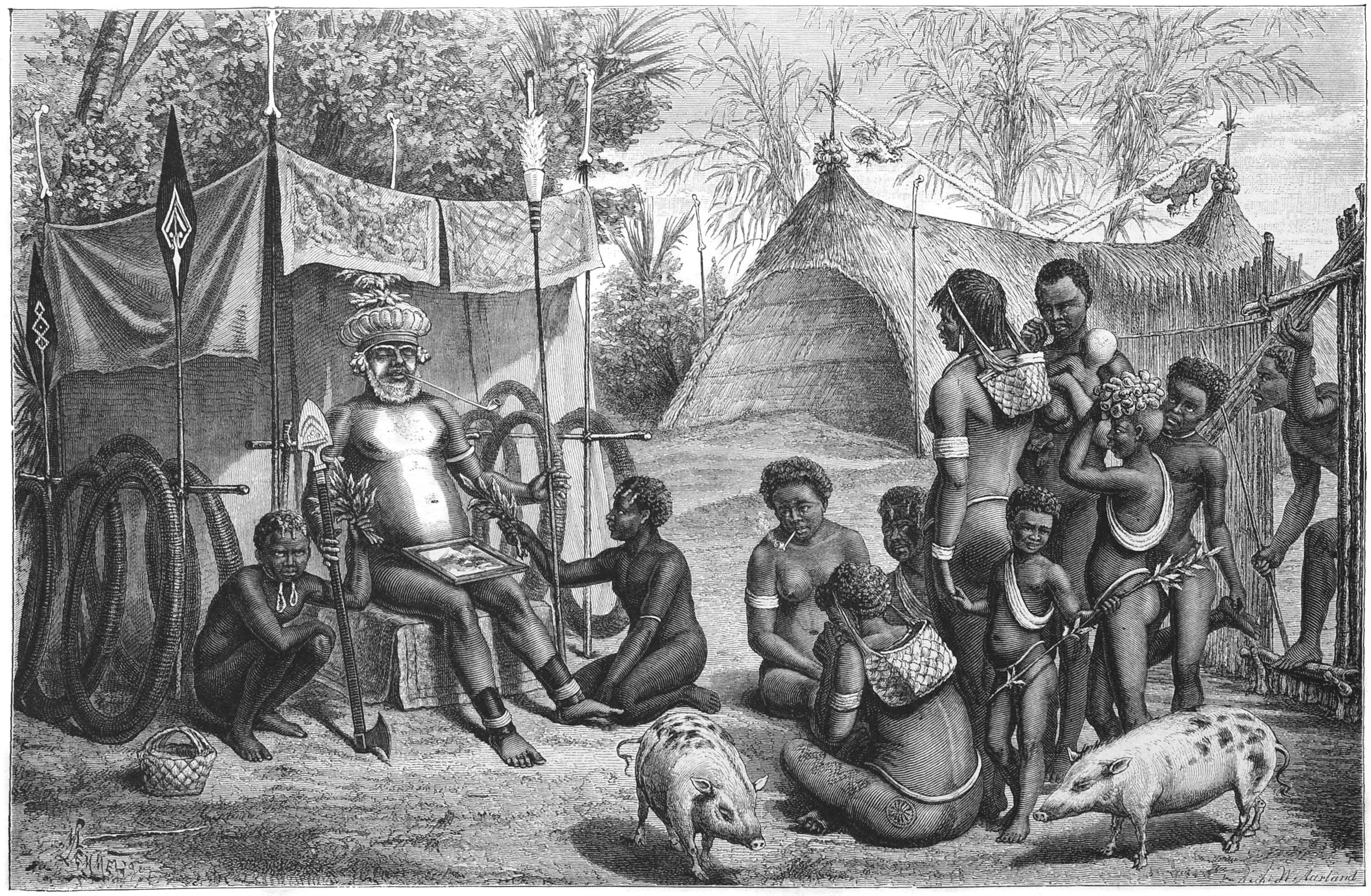
New Britain, c. 1882

The population of New Britain was 493,585 in 2010. Austronesian people make up the majority on the island. The major towns are Rabaul/Kokopo in East New Britain and Kimbe in West New Britain.

New Britain hosts diverse and complex traditional cultures. While the Tolai of the Rabaul area of East New Britain have a matrilineal society, other groups are patrilineal in structure. There are numerous traditions which remain active today, such as the dukduk secret society (also known as tubuan) in the Tolai area.

== Languages ==
Non-Austronesian (Papuan) languages spoken on New Britain:

- Taulil–Butam languages: Taulil, Butam (extinct) (originally from New Ireland)
- Sulka (originally from New Ireland)
- Baining languages: Mali, Kaket, Kairak, Simbali, Ura
- Kol
- Makolkol
- Anêm
- Ata

The last two are spoken in West New Britain, and the rest in East New Britain.

Austronesian languages include Tolai, Lungalunga, Siasi, Kimbe, Lamogai, Mengen and other North New Guinea languages.

== Ecology ==
The island is part of two ecoregions. The New Britain–New Ireland lowland rain forests extend from sea level to 1,000 metres (3,300 ft) elevation. The New Britain–New Ireland montane rain forests cover the mountains of New Britain above 1,000 metres (3,300 ft) elevation.

Forests on New Britain have been rapidly destroyed in recent years, largely to clear land for oil palm plantations. Lowland rainforest has been hardest hit, with nearly a quarter of the forest below 100 metres (330 ft) disappearing between 1989 and 2000. If those rates of deforestation continue, it is estimated that all forest below 200 metres (660 ft) will be cleared by 2060. Despite this, most forest birds on New Britain are still widespread and secure in conservation status, though some forest-dependent species such as the New Britain kingfisher are considered to be at risk of extinction if current trends continue.

== See also ==
- Postage stamps of New Britain
