= East New Britain Province =

Province in Papua New Guinea

East New Britain Province Is Niu Briten Provins (Tok Pisin)
- Flag

- East New Britain Province in Papua New Guinea
- Coordinates: 5°10′S 151°45′E
- Country: Papua New Guinea
- Formation: 1976
- Capital: Kokopo
- Districts: List: Gazelle District; Kokopo District; Pomio District; Rabaul District

Government
  - Governor: Michael Marum

Area
  - Total: 15,724 km^{2} (6,071 sq mi)

Population (2011 census)
  - Total: 328,369
  - Density: 20.883/km^{2} (54.087/sq mi)
- Time zone: UTC+10 (AEST)
- HDI (2022): 0.613 medium · 3rd of 22
- Website: www.eastnewbritain.gov.pg

East New Britain is a province of Papua New Guinea, consisting of the north-eastern part of the island of New Britain and the Duke of York Islands. The capital of the province is Kokopo, not far from the old capital of Rabaul, which was largely destroyed in a volcanic eruption in 1994. East New Britain covers a total land area of 15,816 square kilometres (6,107 sq mi), and the province's population was reported as 220,133 in the 2000 census, rising to 328,369 in the 2011 count. Provincial coastal waters extend over an area of 104,000 square metres (26 acres). The province's only land border is with West New Britain Province to the west, and it also shares a maritime border with New Ireland Province to the east.

East New Britain has a dual economy: a cash economy operates side by side with the subsistence-farming sector. The main crops produced for export are cocoa and copra. Tourism continues to be an increasingly important sector of the provincial economy.

== Languages ==
There are sixteen Austronesian languages spoken in the province, of which Kuanua, spoken by the Tolai on the Gazelle Peninsula is the most widely spoken. Papuan languages are also spoken in the province, including the Baining, Taulil, Ata, Kol, Makolkol, and Sulka languages.

== Districts and LLGs ==
Each province in Papua New Guinea has one or more districts, and each district has one or more Local Level Government (LLG) areas. For census purposes, the LLG areas are subdivided into wards and those into census units.

District	District Capital	LLG Name
Gazelle District	Kerevat	Central Gazelle Rural
Gazelle District	Kerevat	Inland Baining Rural
Gazelle District	Kerevat	Lassul Baining Rural
Gazelle District	Kerevat	Livuan-Reimber Rural
Gazelle District	Kerevat	Toma-Vunadidir Rural
Kokopo District	Kokopo	Bitapaka Rural
Kokopo District	Kokopo	Duke of York Rural
Kokopo District	Kokopo	Kokopo-Vunamami Urban
Kokopo District	Kokopo	Raluana Rural
Pomio District	Pomio	Central-Inland Pomio Rural
Pomio District	Pomio	East Pomio Rural
Pomio District	Pomio	Melkoi Rural
Pomio District	Pomio	Sinivit Rural
Pomio District	Pomio	West Pomio-Mamusi Rural
Rabaul District	Rabaul	Balanataman Rural
Rabaul District	Rabaul	Kombiu Rural
Rabaul District	Rabaul	Rabaul Urban
Rabaul District	Rabaul	Watom Island Rural

== Provincial leaders ==
The province was governed by a decentralised provincial administration, headed by a premier, from 1977 to 1995. Following reforms taking effect that year, the national government reassumed some powers, and the role of Premier was replaced by a position of Governor, to be held by the winner of the province-wide seat in the National Parliament of Papua New Guinea.

=== Premiers (1978–1995) ===
Premier	Term
Koniel Alar	1977–1978
Ereman Tobaining Sr.	1978–1980
Jacob Timele	1980–1981
Ronald ToVue	1981–1989
Sinai Brown	1989–1995

=== Governors (1995–present) ===
Governor	Term
Francis Koimanrea (died 2019)	1995–2000
Leo Dion	2000–2012
Ereman Tobaining Jr.	2012–2017
Nakikus Konga	2017–2022
Michael Marum	2022–present

== Members of the National Parliament ==
The province and each district is represented by a member of the National Parliament. There is one provincial electorate and each district is an open electorate.

Electorate	Member
East New Britain Provincial	Michael Marum
Gazelle Open	Jelta Wong
Kokopo Open	Ereman ToBaining Jr
Pomio Open	Elias Kapavore
Rabaul Open	Allan Marat

== See also ==
- Bismarck Archipelago
