= Kerevat =

- Town
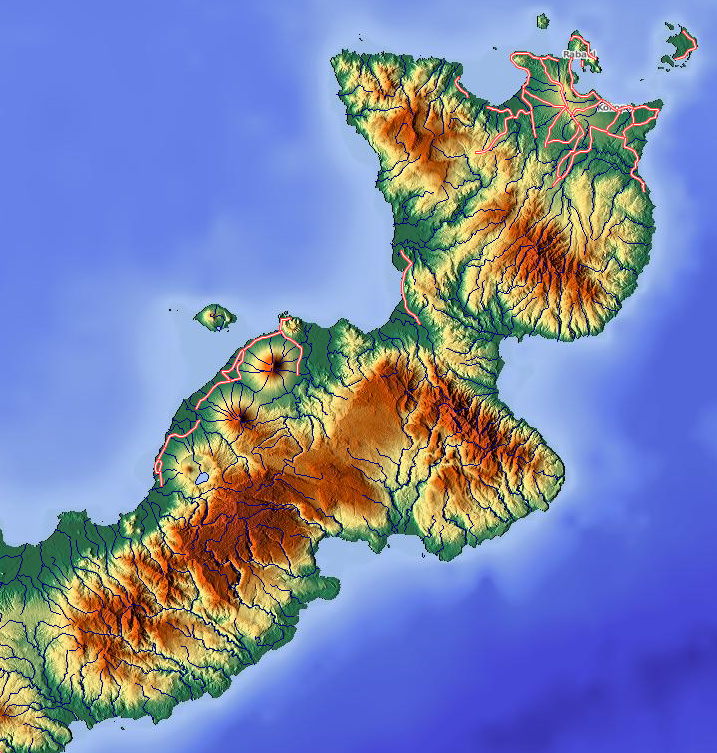
- Location in New Britain
- Coordinates: 4°21′S 152°2′E
- Country: Papua New Guinea
- Province: East New Britain Province
- District: Gazelle District

Population
  - Total: <1,000
- Climate: Af

Kerevat (or Keravat) is a town and seat of Gazelle District in East New Britain Province, on the island of New Britain, Papua New Guinea. It is home to a prison, the Kerevat National High School, the Kerevat Education Centre, and the Cocoa and Coconut Research Institute. Its principal crop is cocoa. An airfield was constructed here by the Imperial Japanese in World War II during September 1943.

== Geography ==
Kerevat lies near Ataliklikun Bay, 6 miles (9.7 km) east of Vunakanau. The Kerevat River flows through Keravet, 3 miles (4.8 km) from the beach to the prison (known as "Kindaim", meaning “crayfish" or “shrimp”). The river flows between the Keravat High School and the prison fence. A coastal road connects Kerevat to Rabaul in the north-east. The average annual rainfall in Kerevat is 278 centimetres (109 in).

== History ==
Keravat Airfield was constructed September 1943 by the Imperial Japanese during World War II, but was never fully operational. The airfield was neutralized by Allied air bombing from 1944, and was abandoned after the cessation of hostilities. In the 1970s, "small trials in natural regeneration management" were conducted here. The New Guinea Electricity Commission operated a power station of 1065 kW in Kerevat as of June 1973.

== Economy ==
The Kerevat area has been subject to land resettlement and is a notable producer of cocoa; Australians began cultivating the land in May 1930. Due to its status in cocoa production, Kerevat contains the Cocoa and Coconut Research Institute. Kerevat has also been a notable research centre for entomology. A new center for entomological activity was established in Kerevat in 1928 by the Department of Agriculture, operated by scientists such as J. L. Froggatt, B. A. O'Connor, and Gordon Dun. Kerevat Correctional Institution, or Kerevat Prison, nicknamed "Kindam" encourages prisoners to help farm the land.

== Kerevat National High School ==
Kerevat National High School and Kerevat Education Centre, are often used to train teachers, medical orderlies, and artisans for the government. Kerevat National High School, the only national high school in the New Guinea Islands region, had an enrollment of 50 to 60 per cent of students from the Islands region and the balance drawn from the rest of the country. The teaching programme covered technical and vocational skills to meet the nation's need to further the development activities. In the past several years, the student who graduated from this school occupied important positions both in the government and public enterprises.

The school's reputation has taken a sharp decline resulting in its temporary closure during 2011 for reasons of “cult activities, the satanic worship reports, fights and other social problems and deteriorating school facilities”. In 2012, Peter O’Neill, Prime Minister of PNG addressed this issue, stating that “Closure of the school is not an option,” and to graduate from classes 11 and 12, standards would be ensured. He also directed his education Minister to institute an inquiry into the affairs of the school administration, particularly regarding misuse of funds during the last five years. This inquiry would also look into the aspect of funding the school from the national exchequer. AusAID and the PNG Government have provided K3 million for refurbishing and upgrading activities.

== Islands Regional Centres (IRCs - Kerevat) ==
In 1913, Germans had plans to establish an Agricultural Research Station in Kerevat on the western boundary of the Vunirima and acquired land for the same. In May 1930, Australians started work on the station, the delay attributed to non availability of a superintendent to supervise the works. The agricultural station encouraged development of rice, maize and peanuts, developed in a rotational cycle and also trained sixteen trainees. Cocoa was introduced in the research station in the later part of the 1940s and early 50s along with copra, and extension officers propagated it widely. Cocoa techniques were modernized to raise crops (as a peasant cash crop), which would be competitive in the world market of cocoa for which Cocoa Growers Association was also established.

In PNG, sweet potato germplasm is currently held at the NARI Highlands Programme, formerly the Highlands Agricultural Experiment Station (1158 accession in 1998), Aiyura, and the NARI Wet-Lowlands, Keravat, formerly the Lowlands Wetland Agricultural Station, Keravat (1062 accessions in 1998). Under the Secretariat for the Pacific Commission (SPC) and Pacific Regional Agricultural Programme (PRAP), PNG sweet potato varieties are being evaluated, indexed and tissue cultured at NARI, Keravat. The Keravat station also has 73 collections from abroad.

Forestry stations, research centres and nurseries were also established at Keravat and in one year in the 1960s, the nursery produced 73,500 teak stumps, and 26,200 Terminalia species seedlings. Assessments have indicated 1,022 genera of Tectona grandis and 624 Eucalyptus species in Kerevat. The climate in the area is of tropical savanna and the annual rainfall varies between 1,750 and 2280mm per annum with an average of 2,077mm.

NARI (National Agriculture Research Institute), CCRI (Cocoa Coconut Research Institute), and OISCA (Overseas International Services Cooperation Agency) are extending full support to Kerevat in livestock, commercial crops, garden crops, and fishing projects. The major livestock are chicken, ducks, fish and pigs. The commercial crops grown are cocoa, coffee, citrus trees, balsa wood, guava, mangostin, pepper and vanilla. Garden crops grown are aibika, broccoli, cabbage (round), capsicum, cucumber, kaukau (sweet potatoes), peanuts and snake bean.

Rice production in the only large rice mill at Kerevat is able to meet the requirement of the Gazelle Peninsula (District). With funding from CSHQ, the number of cocoa trees and rice production could be enhanced to meet the feed requirements of livestock; plans have been charted for the same.

Keravat has an inland fishing project with more than five ponds where breeding of carp and Sepik Talapia takes place; the present stock in the ponds consists of more than 2,500 carp and 5,000 Sepik talapia.

== Agricultural research ==
The research activities in agricultural sciences are promoted through the Wet Lowlands Islands Programme (WLIP), earlier name was the "National Agricultural Research Institute". It is part of the "Lowlands Agricultural Experiment Station (LAES)" at Keravat. The agricultural research activities of all the five Islands provinces of East New Britain, West New Britain, New Ireland, Manus and North Solomon, each of which has its own distinct geographic identity, ethnic diversity and political affiliations (though have similar flora and fauna) are dictated by farmers and stakeholders requirements. The research activities, which are adoptive in nature, tested at the laboratory and sites, are to cover: “Alternative Cash Crops such as vanilla, nutmeg, pepper, turmeric, cardamom, balsa; vegetables like pitpit and aibika; staple crops such as sweet potato, taro, Singapore taro, banana, cassava and yam; fruits and nuts -Indigenous nuts such as galip, okari and pau; commercialization of cocoa and other alternative cash crops; development and processing of rice, grains & pulses, maize, lowlands rice; and weeds management, Atolls agriculture development and Plant derived Pesticides.” Training is an essential part of the research involving farmers with field visits, film shows and other publicity materials.

National Agricultural Research Institute, Papua New Guinea in its Islands Regional Research Centre at Keravat (one of the four in PNG) has taro germplasm collection apart from traditional and exotic fruits and nuts species and traditional vegetables. Plant genetic resources held in ex situ in the field and in the lab are: Keravta field collections are 105 national collections of sweet potato, 60 of bananas and 10 of taro; and Kerevata tissue culture are 5 working collections of sweet potatoes, 23 working collections of bananas and 5 working collections of Taro.

At the Lowlands Agricultural Experiment Station (LAES), the regional (islands) research station of the National Agricultural Research Institute (NARI) of PNG at Kerevat, eight selected clones (derived from 20 seedling trees that were evaluated over a 20-year period between 1980 and 1992 of durian (Durio zibethinus Murr) trees of the humid tropics were released to farmers with small holdings. The edible fruit from this tree has a distinctive and delicious flavor (may not be popular for its smell to many). NARI Keravat, has a programme of distributing grafted seedlings of these selected trees to those interested to plant and raise them. The eight local varieties identified for their “yield, taste, flesh and colour” are “NKDZ5, NKDZ7, NKDZ8, NKDZ9, NKDZ11, NKDZ12, NKDZ15 and NKDZ20”.

== Climate ==
Keravat has a tropical rainforest climate (Af) with heavy rainfall year-round.

Climate data for Keravat
| Month | Jan | Feb | Mar | Apr | May | Jun | Jul | Aug | Sep | Oct | Nov | Dec | Year |
|---|---|---|---|---|---|---|---|---|---|---|---|---|---|
| Mean daily maximum °C (°F) | 30.7 (87.3) | 30.8 (87.4) | 30.6 (87.1) | 30.5 (86.9) | 30.7 (87.3) | 30.7 (87.3) | 29.8 (85.6) | 30.0 (86.0) | 30.9 (87.6) | 31.1 (88.0) | 31.2 (88.2) | 30.8 (87.4) | 30.7 (87.2) |
| Daily mean °C (°F) | 27.0 (80.6) | 27.0 (80.6) | 27.0 (80.6) | 26.8 (80.2) | 27.1 (80.8) | 27.0 (80.6) | 26.4 (79.5) | 26.4 (79.5) | 27.0 (80.6) | 27.1 (80.8) | 27.3 (81.1) | 27.0 (80.6) | 26.9 (80.5) |
| Mean daily minimum °C (°F) | 23.3 (73.9) | 23.2 (73.8) | 23.4 (74.1) | 23.2 (73.8) | 23.5 (74.3) | 23.3 (73.9) | 23.0 (73.4) | 22.9 (73.2) | 23.2 (73.8) | 23.2 (73.8) | 23.4 (74.1) | 23.3 (73.9) | 23.2 (73.8) |
| Average rainfall mm (inches) | 228 (9.0) | 255 (10.0) | 295 (11.6) | 258 (10.2) | 213 (8.4) | 172 (6.8) | 172 (6.8) | 173 (6.8) | 182 (7.2) | 186 (7.3) | 235 (9.3) | 283 (11.1) | 2,652 (104.5) |
Source: Climate-Data.org
