= Peopling of Oceania =

Early human migrations to Oceania

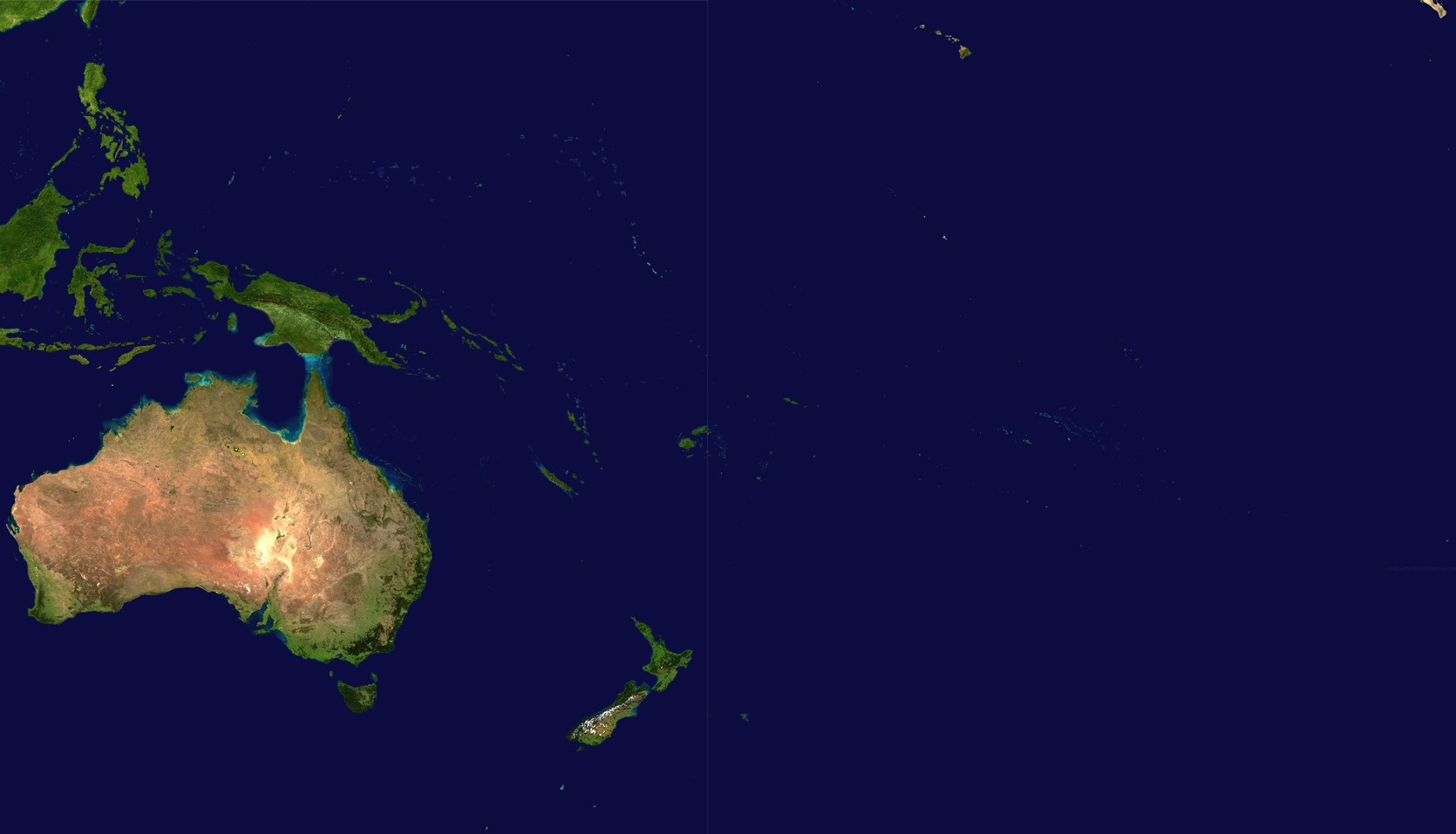
Satellite image centered on Oceania.

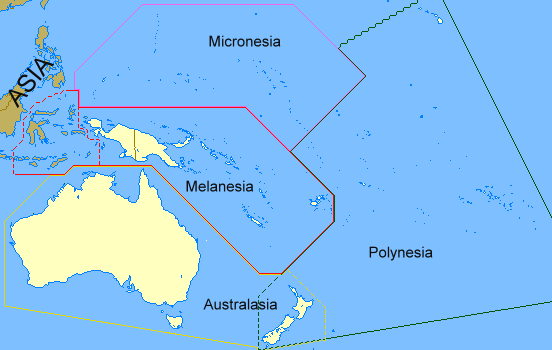
Oceania and its five major subdivisions.

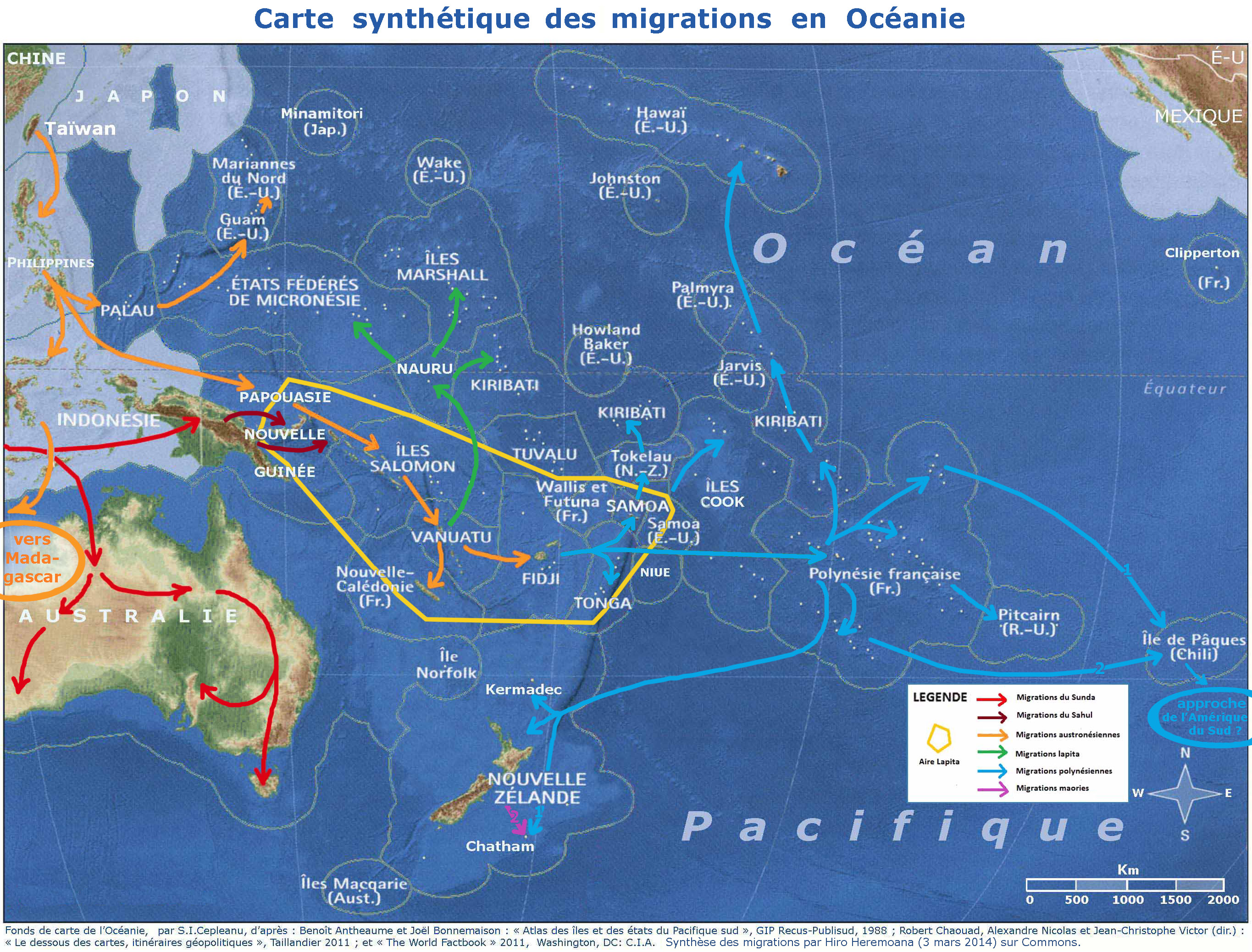
Summary of ancient migratory movements in Oceania.

Oceania is a geographical region with disputed borders but generally encompasses Australia, New Guinea, Melanesia, Micronesia, and Polynesia. (Note: The division of Oceania into three historical regions is now being questioned by some researchers, who find it irrelevant and prefer the concepts of Near Oceania and Remote Oceania. Tcherkézoff (2008))

The prehistoric peopling of Oceania took place through two major expansion movements. The first occurred between 50,000 and 70,000 years ago and brought Homo sapiens hunter-gatherers from continental Asia to populate Insulindia, then nearby Oceania, i.e. New Guinea, Australia, and certain Melanesian islands.

The second wave is more recent, starting around 6,000 years ago. Farmers and navigators from Taiwan, speaking Austronesian languages, populated Insulinde, i.e. the Philippines, Malaysia, and Indonesia. From the eastern islands of Indonesia, these Austronesian navigators made their way, from 1500 BC onwards, to New Guinea and Melanesia, then to the islands of distant Oceania. They were the first to reach Micronesia and Polynesia. Tonga, in western Polynesia, was first settled around 3,300 years ago. Perhaps a millennium ago, they even reached South America. Finally, Austronesians speaking Barito languages, who may have started from Borneo further west, reached the African island of Madagascar 1,500 years ago, making it the fourth major Austronesian island in linguistic terms.

All along the way, the populations of the first and, above all, second waves of settlement mixed to a considerable extent, both culturally and genetically. Focusing on these two major waves of modern human settlement, this does not rule out intermediate colonization: the Pama-Nyungan wave in Australia from south of Sulawesi (Toalian culture), and the Trans-Neo-Guinean wave in New Guinea.

The question of the origin of the Oceanians has been one of the major themes of Oceanic research since the 19th century. Today, thanks to archaeology, linguistics, ethnolinguistics, ethnobotany, and genetics, there is a more or less coherent answer to this question, but many points remain unresolved.

== The first Homo sapiens in Oceania ==
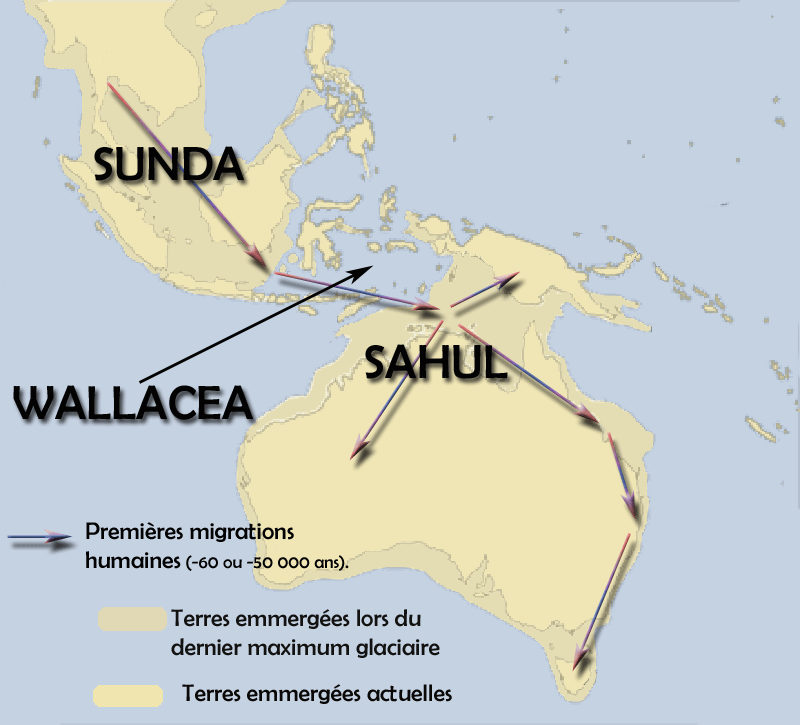
Estimated map of the first human migrations, between 70 and 50,000 years ago

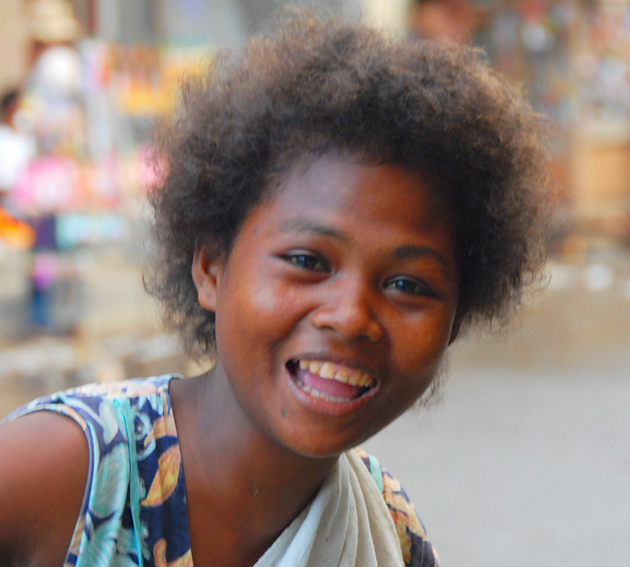
Ati woman from the Philippines (Negrito)

There is no known evidence of archaic human species having outgrown the Wallacea to establish themselves in the Sahul (Australia and New Guinea), before the arrival of the first Homo sapiens in Australia. Flores Man, present on the island of Flores in Indonesia since at least 700,000 years Before Present (AP), is not known outside Flores.

Genetic research has revealed partial hybridization between the first Homo sapiens to arrive in the region and Denisova Man, who probably populated much of eastern Asia before the arrival of modern humans. This research also shows a possible weak hybridization of East Asian Homo sapiens with another as yet unidentified local human species.

Around 70,000 years ago, insular Southeast Asia was not the archipelago it is today, but a continental shelf, the Sunda plateau, a peninsular extension of the Asian continent. Australia's shoreline extended much further into the Timor Sea. Australia and New Guinea, linked by a land bridge across the Arafura Sea, the Gulf of Carpentaria, and Torres Strait, formed a single landmass called Sahul, which also encompassed Tasmania. Between Sunda and Sahul lay an archipelago that geographers call Wallacea, the eastern part of Indonesia. At that time, it was possible to travel from Sunda to Sahul without having to cross more than 100 km of sea.

=== The Peopling of Sunda ===
The first migrations of Homo sapiens to Sunda and Wallacea are poorly understood, and are thought to date back at least 60,000 years.

Today's Negrito populations testify to the fact that an ancient population layer, now marginalized and submerged by Austronesian farmers, settled in Sunda. It also spread further afield, as these populations, now relict, also live in the Andaman Islands and the Philippines. The Negritos are probably the oldest modern humans in Southeast Asia (along with the Ainus of Japan, the Hmong-Mien, and the ancient Qiang of Tibet), with the ancestors of these groups settling in the region at least 70,000 years ago.

Despite their similar appearance (very dark skin, frizzy hair, short stature), genetic analyses of the various Negrito groups show an uncertain kinship, which would indicate a very ancient settlement origin. Cross-breeding with neighboring Austronesian populations has also blurred the genetic signature of these populations.

=== The Peopling of Sahul ===
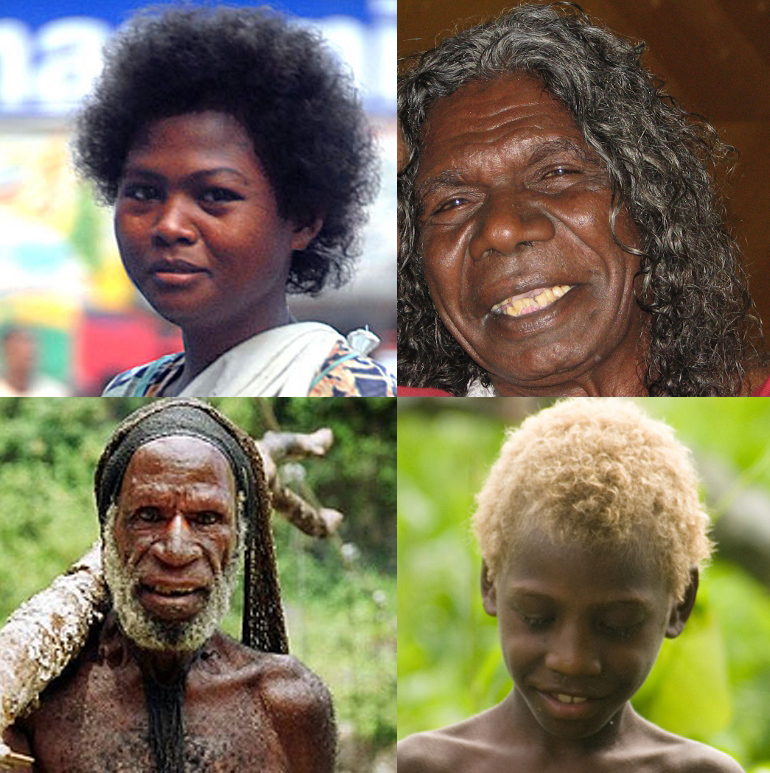
Four populations from the first waves of settlement: 1. Negrito woman from the Philippines 2. Australian Aboriginal man 3. Papuan man from New Guinea 4. Melanesian child from Vanuatu.

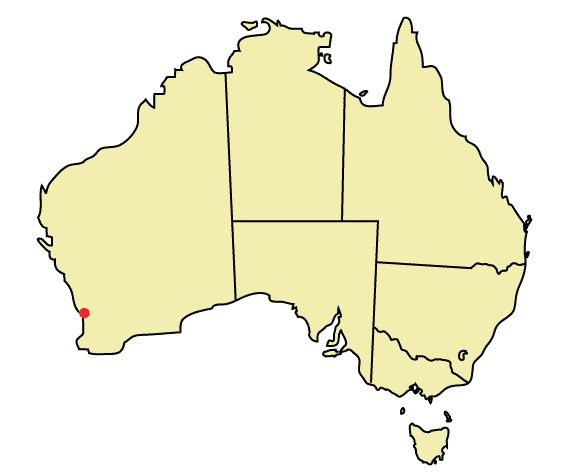
The mouth of the Swan (at Perth). Upstream, a human settlement has been dated to 38,000 years ago.

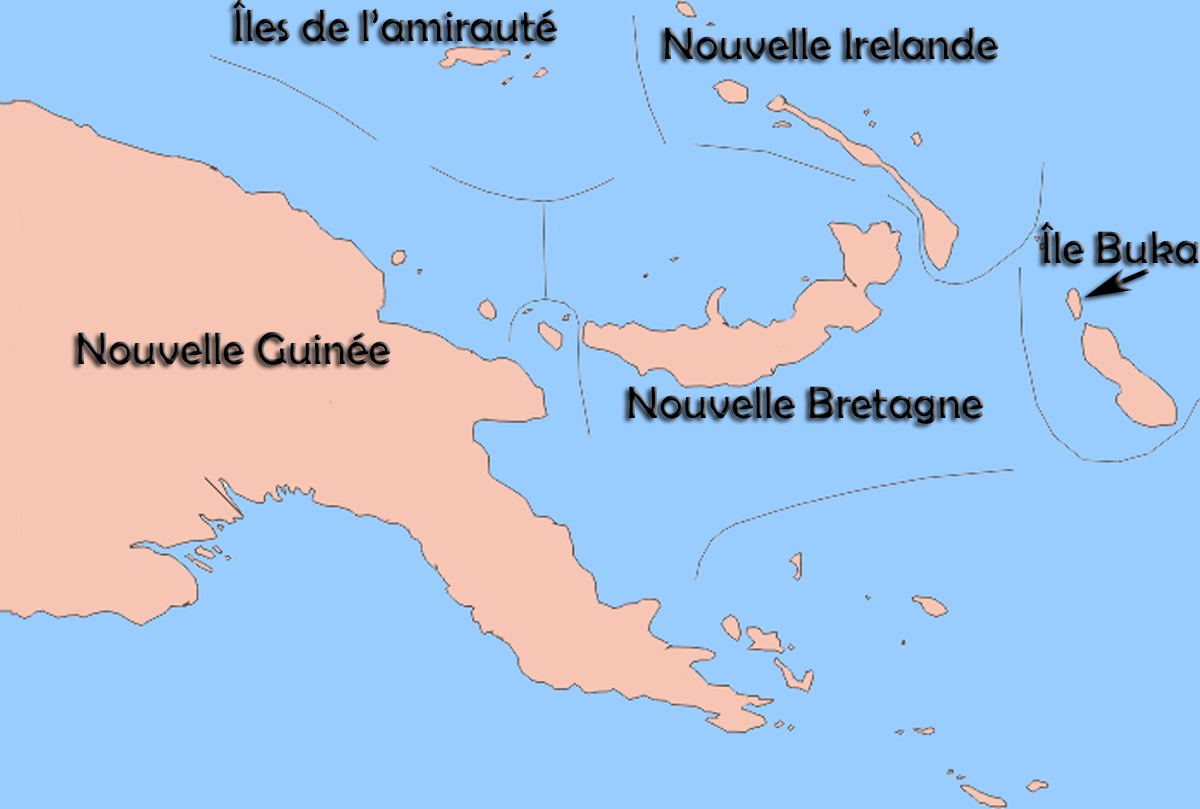
Islands in eastern New Guinea, populated between 30,000 and 12,000 BC.

Migration from Sunda through the Wallacea occurred during the Late Pleistocene, when sea levels were much lower than today. Repeated episodes of glaciation during the Pleistocene resulted in sea levels 100 to 150 meters lower than today. Between 70,000 and 50,000 years ago, the first settlement occurred in the Sahul (New Guinea and Australia).

A 2007 genetic analysis concluded that the "settlement of Australia and Papua New Guinea by modern humans was carried out by a single group of people who remained in substantial or total isolation until recent times. The finding would rule out hypotheses about later waves of migration [...]. The Aboriginal peoples of Australia and the inhabitants of Papua New Guinea would be the descendants of a single founding population". Genetically, these earliest human migrations into Sahul are associated with the divergence of the Ancient East Eurasians lineage. Other recent genetic evidence from Aboriginal Australians and Papuans also suggests that these peoples originated from a common ancestral population, eventually diverging in their respective genetic groups after an initial bottleneck, with little evidence of subsequent gene flow.

Humans are thought to have sailed between the Wallacea and the Sahul, then diffused across the continent. Models converge on the idea that the first entry into New Guinea via Sulawesi is the most likely, although a southern route through Bali, Timor, and onto the Sahul plateau now drowned in the Arafura Sea north of the modern Kimberley region of Western Australia is also plausible, the two hypotheses not being mutually exclusive. The Sahul settlement is now the oldest evidence of deep-sea navigation. A much earlier island settlement is known towards the island of Florès, but over a much shorter sea distance. To reach Florès, the widest strait (based on sea level at the time) was only 19 km, so it was always in visual contact with a coastline.

Archaeology has revealed a human settlement in the headwaters of the Swan River in Western Australia, dating back 38,000 years. According to excavations at the Warreen Cave site, humans arrived in Tasmania, then linked by a land bridge to Australia, around 35,000 years ago.

"At the same time, the few dozen kilometers separating the Bismarck Archipelago from Sahul were crossed: New Britain and New Ireland were reached, and then, one hundred and sixty kilometers away, the Buka Island in the north of the Solomon Archipelago: a true 28,000-year-old feat. Finally, to close the first phase in the settlement of Oceania, Manus Island (Admiralty Islands), 240 km north of the Bismarcks, was inhabited by Oceanians 12,000 years ago".

By this date (12,000 B.C.), the expansion of first-wave settlers seems to have ceased. The Solomon Islands, just south of Buka Island, remained untouched by human occupation. "In the present state of knowledge, there is a time gap of more than eight millennia before the race towards the ocean is resumed".

Between 6,000 and 12,000 years ago, with the end of the last Ice Age, sea levels rose to their present level, submerging the land bridges between Australia and New Guinea on the one hand, and Australia and Tasmania on the other.

The populations of New Guinea, Australia, and Tasmania are now developing separately. The ancestors of the Papuans of New Guinea, at least those from the highlands, developed a complex horticultural system. Its earliest traces date back 9,000 years, just after those found in Mesopotamia, which are generally considered to be the oldest. For example, "the ancient agricultural region of Kuk, in Papua New Guinea, comprises 116 hectares of marshland in the west of the island of New Guinea, at an altitude of 1,500 meters. Archaeological excavations have revealed that these marshes have been farmed almost continuously for 7,000 to 10,000 years. The site has well-preserved archaeological remains showing the technological evolution that transformed plant exploitation into agriculture".

In contrast, Aboriginal Australians remained hunter-gatherers, as geoclimatic conditions were less favorable to agriculture, with a highly irregular rainfall pattern.

== The Austronesian wave ==
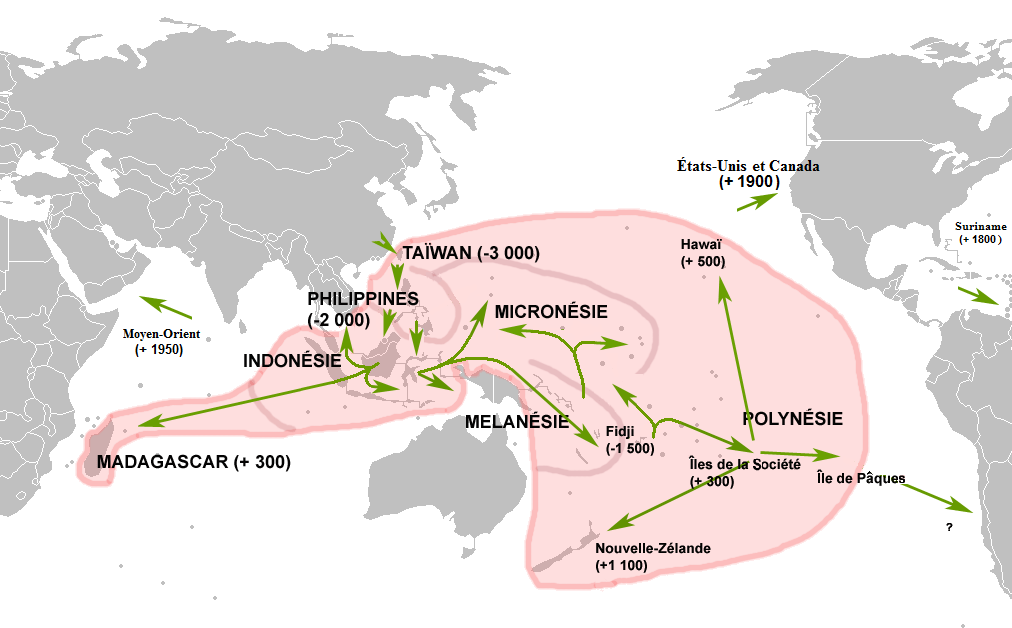
Expansion of Austronesian languages

=== Asian origins ===
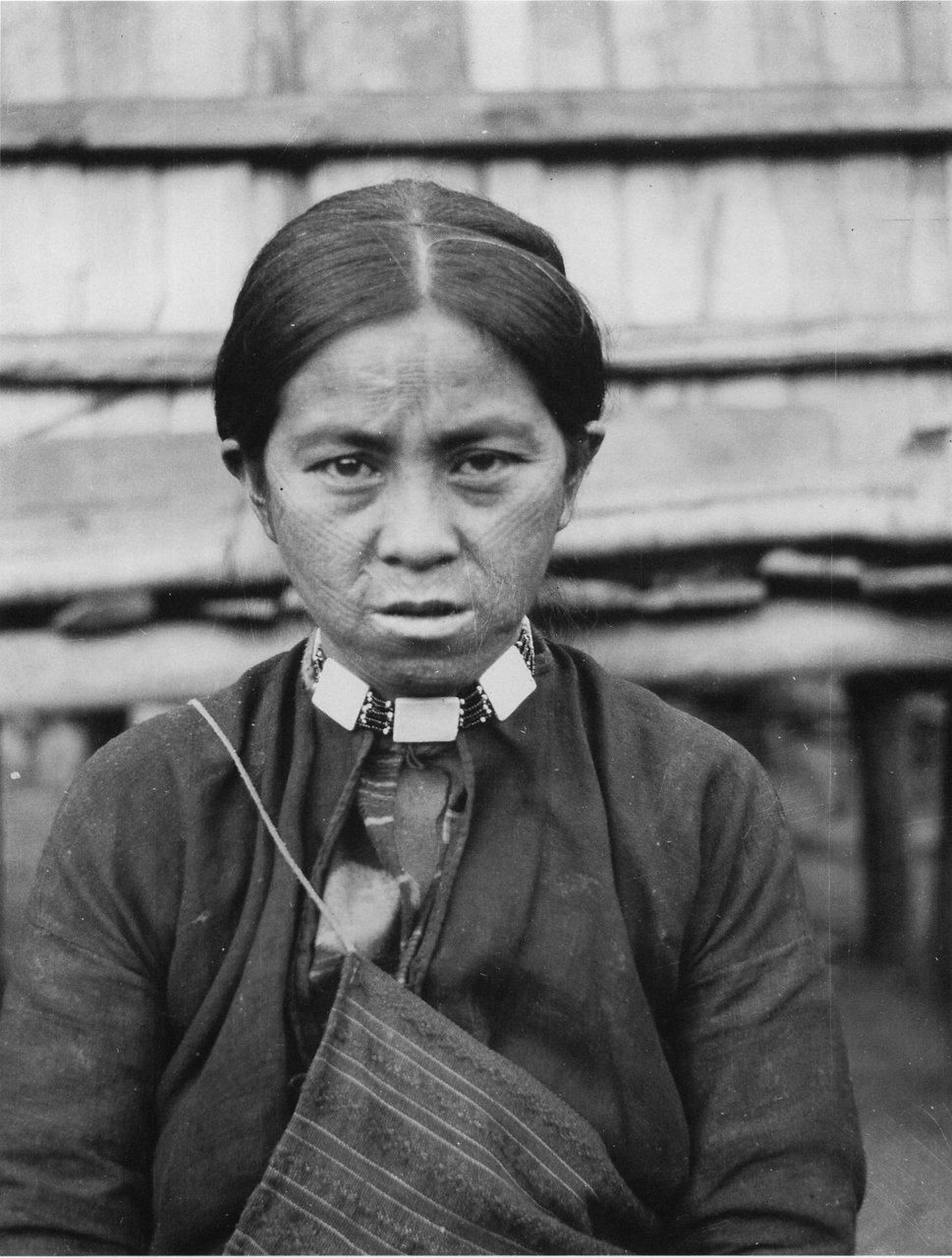
An Atayal woman, an Austronesian tribe from Taiwan, with tattoos on her face.

6,000 years ago (circa 4000 BC), millet-and rice-growing coastal dwellers from southern China began crossing the Strait to settle in Taiwan. Their descendants, still speaking Austronesian languages, are today's Taiwanese Indigenous peoples.

Around 2500 BC, migrations took place from Taiwan to the Philippines.

Between the end of the 3rd millennium and 1500 B.C., new migrations led to the settlement of groups that archaeology identifies as coming from the Philippines to northern Borneo, Sulawesi, and Timor, and from there to the other islands of the Indonesian archipelago. The cultivation of rice began to decline in some areas in favor of new tropical plants, and rice was little used in the Pacific, except in the Mariana Islands in northern Micronesia.

Around 1500 BC, another movement led from Indonesia to the shores of New Guinea, Melanesia, and beyond to the Pacific islands.

The Austronesians were undoubtedly the first great navigators in human history.

In 2010, Hiria Ottino and 5 crew members, on O Tahiti Nui Freedom, a simple outrigger and sail pirogue, retraced the migration route in 123 days, in the opposite direction: Tahiti, Cook Islands, Tonga, Fiji, Vanuatu, Solomon Islands, Papua New Guinea, Palau, Philippines, and China.

=== Pottery and migration routes ===
The Austronesian populations who settled in Oceania were not only farmers and navigators, they were also potters. Several cultural areas have been identified, facilitating the differentiation and dating of migration waves.

==== Lapita from Melanesia and Polynesia ====
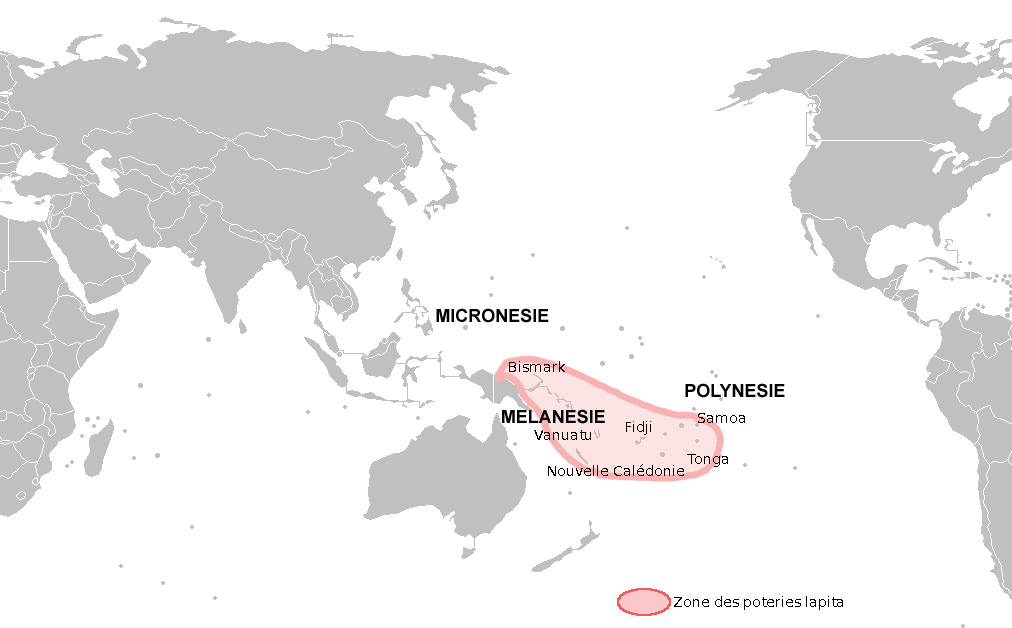
Lapita pottery area.

Father Otto Meyer was the first to discover these potteries in 1909 on the island of Watom, in the Bismarck Archipelago (now in Papua New Guinea). In 1917, the geologist Maurice Piroutet also found some in a locality in northern New Caledonia called Lapita. This name was subsequently adopted by archaeologists to designate the whole of this pottery and the associated cultural complex, which characterizes an area stretching from the Bismarck Archipelago in the west to Tonga and Samoa in the east. The pottery features intricate geometric patterns impressed into the clay by small, toothed stamps.

Throughout the 20th century, various excavations uncovered further examples of this pottery throughout the western Pacific (or Near Oceania), including the Solomon Islands, Vanuatu, New Caledonia, Fiji, Wallis and Futuna, and as far as Samoa.

It has been generally considered that the Lapita were Austronesian speakers from Asia since all the populations in these areas currently speak Austronesian languages. The pottery is also seen as a sign that the Austronesians who populated Polynesia had spent a long time on the Melanesian islands, since Lapita pottery is common to both areas, and Melanesia is the older of the two. However, whether this type of pottery was directly brought by immigrants (and therefore initially developed outside the Lapita zone) or whether it was developed locally remains a subject of debate among experts, with some authors even defending a totally or partially non-Austronesian origin, within the pre-Austronesian cultures of Melanesia. Lapita pottery is, however, linked to traces of agriculture or tools whose counterparts are found in Southeast Asia, which argues in favor of Austronesian speakers.

The oldest known Lapita site (as of 2000) is "in the north of the Bismarck Archipelago, on one of the islets around Mussau. At the Talepakemalai site, around 3,500 years ago, a small population appeared, apparently different from those who had populated the Sahul for dozens of millennia. [...] Thanks to these easily identifiable test pots, it is possible to locate the Lapita in Samoa around 3,000 years ago. Thus, in less than five centuries, a veritable people of the ocean settled on most of the islands between the north of the Bismarck Archipelago and Samoa, via the Solomons, Vanuatu, New Caledonia, Fiji, Futuna, and Wallis. This maritime space covers four and a half thousand kilometers; between the Vanuatu archipelago and Fiji, there is a gap of over eight hundred kilometers to cross, as the crow flies, but certainly more than a thousand by tacking".

One of the questions concerning Lapita pottery, however, is its virtual absence from Eastern Polynesia, since archaeology has so far only uncovered a few shards in the Marquesas Islands. This is why some researchers have suggested that the inhabitants of remote Oceania did not pass through (or did not stay there for long) what is traditionally called Melanesia, but migrated further north, via the Philippines and Micronesia. However, current data, particularly genetic, suggest a long passage of Polynesians through the islands of Melanesia.

As they advanced south and east, the Austronesians of the Lapita culture brought with them more than just pottery. They also brought numerous plants and animals. They were "undoubtedly talented horticulturists. They began to enrich the poor islands of the southwest Pacific with plants transported over generations from South-East Asia and New Guinea: yams, various araceae, breadfruit, sugar cane...".

==== The different populations of Micronesia ====
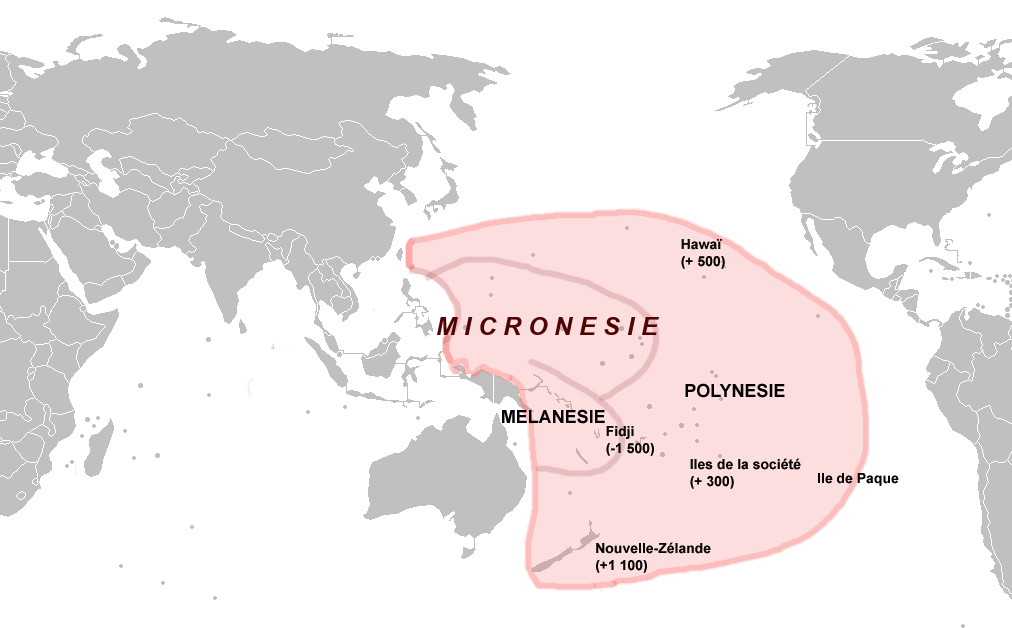
Situation in Micronesia.

From a linguistic point of view, Micronesia does not form a coherent whole, and there is no such thing as a "Micronesian" language group from a scientific point of view. Some of the languages spoken in Micronesia are not even Oceanic languages, such as the Austronesian language subgroup, which seems to have originated from the Lapita culture, and Melanesia populated Polynesia. Some of Micronesia's languages, such as Chamorro and Paluan, are more closely related to the Austronesian languages of the Philippines. The westernmost part of Micronesia therefore seems to have populations that originated at least in part in this region and then remained in more or less regular contact with populations in or around the Philippines. The situation is different for the eastern part of Micronesia, where the origins seem to come more from the Austronesian Lapita populations, from the southern Solomons or northern Vanuatu.

Given the linguistic splintering in the west (Marianas and Carolines) and the relative homogeneity in the east (Gilbert and Marshall), there's nothing to say with any certainty about a homogeneous settlement, especially as the discovery of the Nanumaga sea caves (Tuvalu, in an area traditionally attributed to Micronesia but now populated by Polynesians) seems to date human occupation to a much earlier period. The greatest linguistic diversity is to be found in the central part of the region, which should indicate that this is the area of earliest settlement (Chuuk, Kosrae, Pohnpei).

Around 3,500 years ago, or 1,500 B.C., around the same time as the appearance of the Lapita in Melanesia, potters began to settle in western Micronesia. The island of Saipan, south of the Marianas, was settled over 3,500 years ago by sailors from the Philippines; like the Lapita, they were ceramists, but from a different tradition. To reach the Marianas, the first Micronesians probably didn't cross the 1,500-kilometer-wide Philippine Sea; they probably followed the chain of islands that stretches between Halmahera (the Moluccas) and Saipan, but no such early date has yet been recorded. The earliest settlement of the island of Yap, on this route, dates back only to the beginning of our era". Spriggs notes that "there are very specific parallels with Southeast Asian pottery", which can be explained by the supposed Filipino origin of some of the Micronesians (the most western of them). Around this time, trade links were forged between "Central Micronesia (Chuuk, Kosrae, and Pohnpei, formerly Ponape, in the Caroline Islands)" and sailors from Vanuatu (Melanesia), links that would last until modern times. Much further east, the Gilbertins and Marshallese are homogeneous groups, while the inhabitants of Nauru are of more uncertain origin.

A 2022 genetic study has shown that the various peoples inhabiting Micronesia have diverse genetic origins and originate from distinct streams of migration. Micronesia was settled by three separate streams of First Remote Oceanian lineage, which corresponds to East Asian ancestry and clusters closely to modern day peoples of the Philippines such as the Kankanaey and the Amis and Atayal of Taiwan. The first wave of First Remote Oceanian lineage settled the Mariana Islands around 2800 BCE. A second separate wave settled Palau around 2400 BCE. A third separate wave settled Central Micronesia around 2100 BCE. The peoples of Central Micronesia and Palau have a degree of Papuan ancestry, but this is absent from the peoples of the Mariana Islands. The study also supports the Admiralty Islands as the source of the Central Micronesian peoples and languages.

=== Linguistics and migration routes ===
Austronesian languages, as currently classified by linguists, give a picture of the migration routes followed. The island's fragmentation explains the large number of languages recorded −1,200 to 1,300- but these are grouped into families or sub-families, indicating migratory movements from common regional centers. These linguistic origins do not necessarily overlap with biological origins, as the same language can be adopted by groups of distinct origins. Some strong similarities between Austronesian languages may also be areal (acquired through long contact in a common area) and not genetic (linked to a single origin within a recent sub-group). For these reasons, the grouping of languages into subgroups within the Austronesian family is sometimes the subject of debate among linguists.

At the most basic level, these languages are today divided into two groups: the languages of Taiwan, and the Malayo-Polynesian languages. The latter range from the Philippines to Madagascar, from Malaysia to Easter Island, and include virtually all Austronesian languages on record.

Within the Malayo-Polynesian group, the languages of Insulinde (Indonesia, Malaysia, and the Philippines) are the most numerous. The languages of Madagascar are included in the Barito language subgroup of Kalimantan (Indonesia), giving a good indication of their origin.

A simplified tree of Austronesian language families spoken in Oceania, with their number and location, proposed by SIL International.

The Oceanic languages are a sub-group of the Malayo-Polynesian languages, numbering 500 languages, some with very small numbers of speakers. They are widespread in Melanesia, Micronesia, and Polynesia, as well as on the northern and Melanesian coasts of New Guinea, where some coastal populations speak Austronesian languages. Their closest relatives are the languages of Central Malayo-Polynesian, spoken in part of Indonesia, on some coasts of New Guinea and in Timor, a kinship that makes it reasonable to define the origin of speakers of Oceanian in this region of southern Insulindia.

Among the Oceanic languages, there are five main groups:

- Admiralty Islands (Melanesia), with 31 languages;
- St Mathias in New Guinea, with 2 languages;
- The Yap language, in Micronesia;
- The western group, with 230 languages, in Melanesia and on the coasts of New Guinea.
- The central-eastern group, with 234 languages in Melanesia, Micronesia, and the whole of Polynesia.
- Within the central-eastern group, Fijian-Polynesian comprises 42 languages spoken in Fiji (Melanesia) and throughout Polynesia. From Polynesia, "reverse" migrations occurred westwards, and some islands in Micronesia and Melanesia, the Polynesian outlier, speak Polynesian languages.

These distributions show that the linguistic groupings are far from corresponding to the traditional subdivisions of Austronesian Oceania: Micronesia, Melanesia, and Polynesia. Not only do these languages spill over onto the coasts of New Guinea but they also cross these groupings, with some Melanesian languages (the Polynesian exclaves) belonging to the Polynesian language group. This subdivision, proposed by Dumont d'Urville in 1831, is now scientifically outdated.

Nevertheless, Melanesia is the matrix of Oceanic languages. It is in this region, and on the Neo-Guinean coasts close to it, that the greatest number of languages and linguistic groups are found, a diversification that seems a good marker of the antiquity of Malayo-Polynesian speakers in this area. This clue is also correlated with archaeology, as the first Lapita cultivators (considered Austronesian) first settled in this region.

It is from this nucleus that the Fijian group seems to have been identified. Linguistics allows us to define that, despite the differences in appearance between Polynesians and Fijians (the latter being generally more Melanesian in appearance), the Polynesian groups that populated the central Pacific islands migrated from this area. (Note: Some authors question whether East Fijian is directly related to Polynesian languages, arguing instead for an areal resemblance linked to later Tongan influences from the 10th century onwards.) According to Patrick Kirch and Roger Green, the Lapita in Samoa, Tonga, Wallis and Futuna differentiated themselves from their Fijian neighbors, developing their language, Proto-Polynesian, the ancestor of all Polynesian languages. It was from this area that Polynesia was first settled.

=== Mixture of 1st wave and 2nd wave populations ===
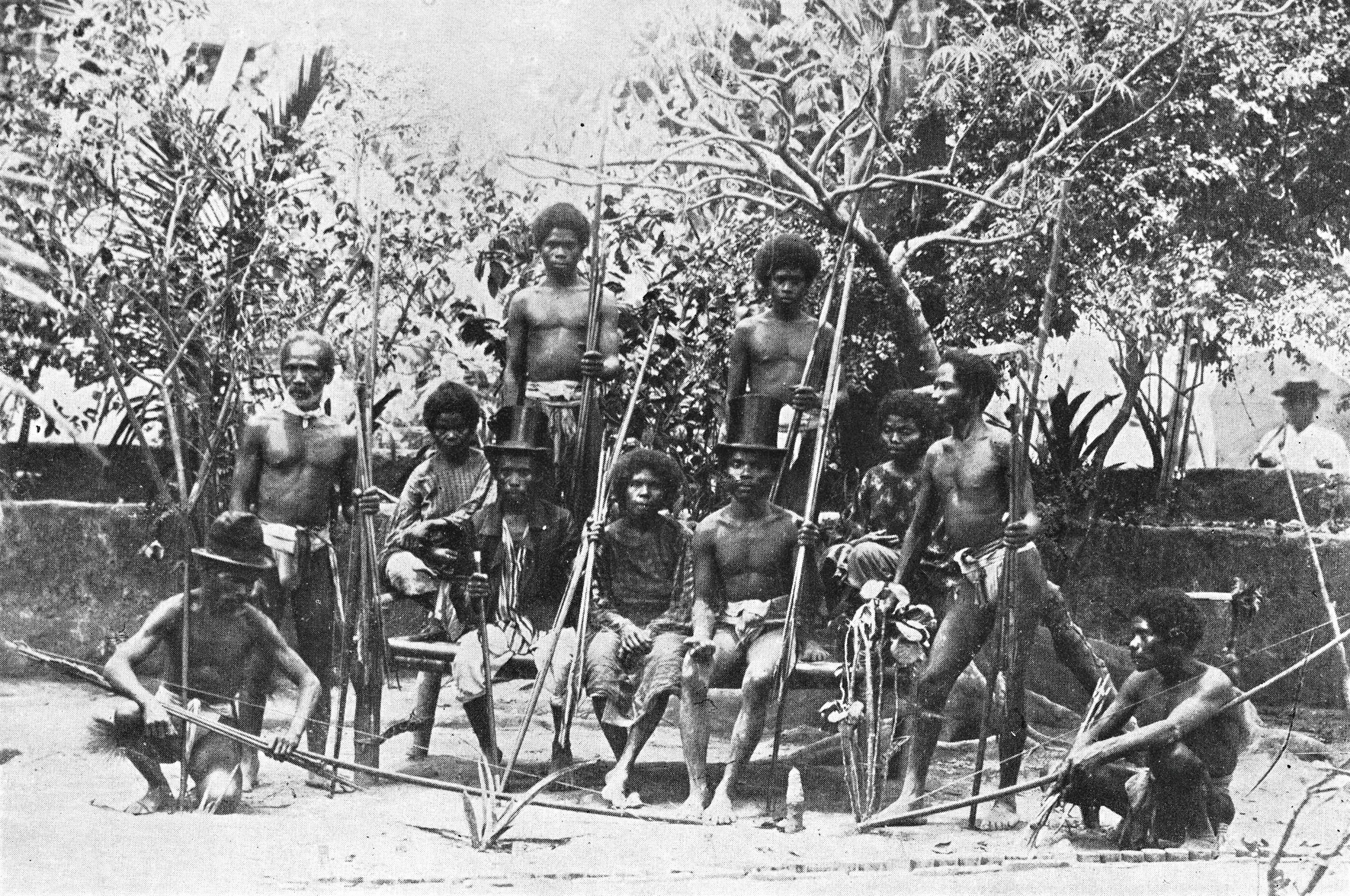
Negritos from the Philippines, circa 1899.

The first interbreeding took place in the Philippines and continued along the route taken by Austronesian farmers and sailors.

==== In Sunda ====
Genetic analysis of Negrito populations in ancient Sunda and neighboring regions (Philippines) shows a certain level of interbreeding. This interbreeding was not only biological, as some Negrito populations in Malaysia (such as the Jakun) or the Philippines (such as the Aeta) now speak Austronesian languages.

The Negrito populations seem to have ignored agriculture before the arrival of the Austronesians. They were hunter-gatherer populations, apparently few. Genetic and cultural interbreeding, therefore, seems to have taken place more towards the Negritos than in the other direction.

The level of interbreeding can vary from one group to another. Thus, while the Semang of Malaysia shows a fairly high degree of genetic homogeneity, "the Senoi seem to be a composite group, with about half of their maternal lines going back to [the same] ancestors [as the] Semang, and the other half [coming] from Indochina. This is in line with the hypothesis that they are [partial] descendants of the first Austronesian farmers and speakers, who brought both their language and technology to the southern part of the [Malay] peninsula around 4,000 years ago, and mixed with the indigenous population".

Further south, on the other hand, interbreeding was largely to the Austronesian arrivals, when they reached New Guinea and Melanesia.

==== In Melanesia and New Guinea ====
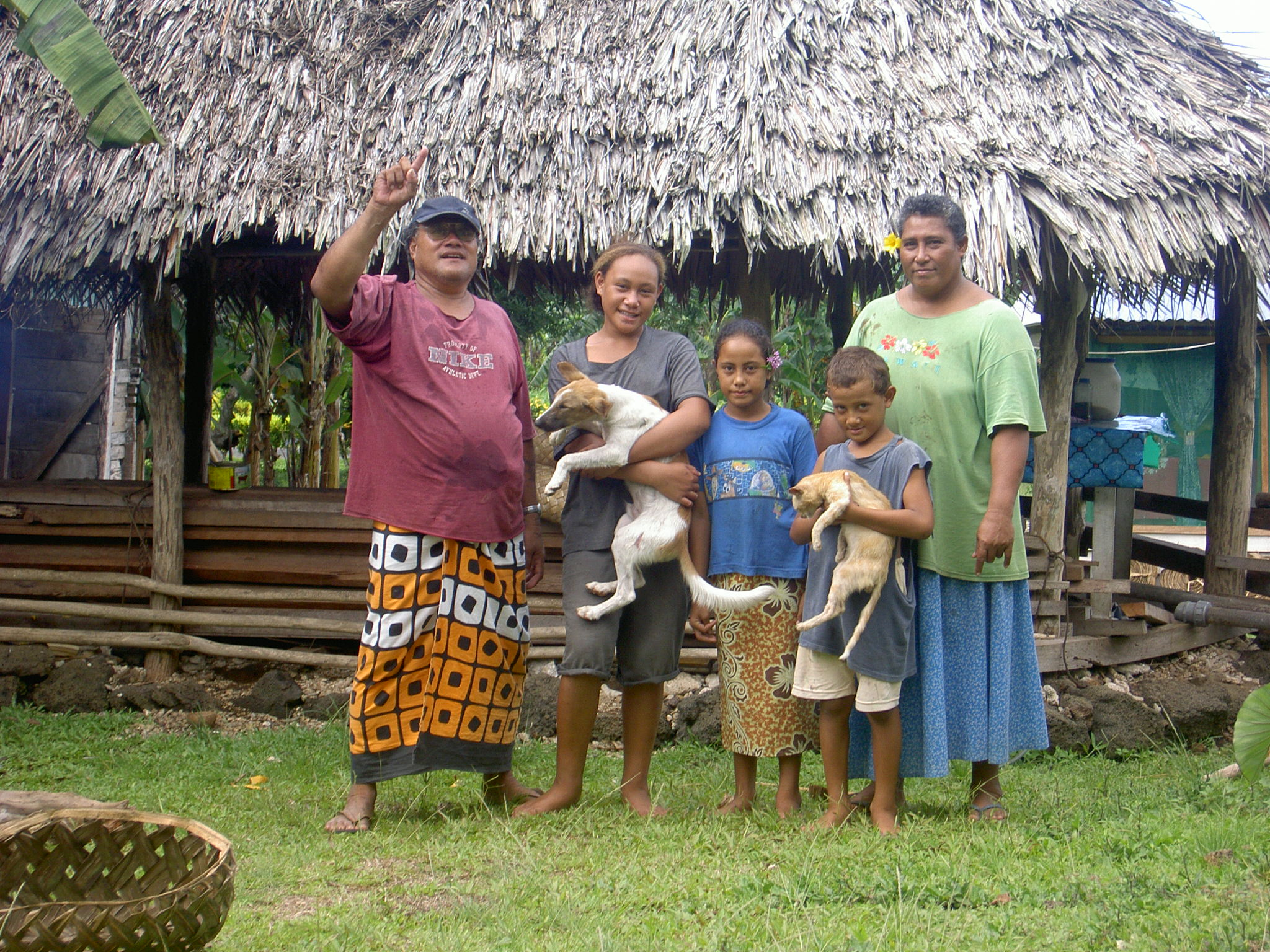
A family from Samoa. Polynesians are a mixed population, descended from second-wave Asians and 1st-wave Melanesians.

The clear distinction between Melanesians and Polynesians, based on human skin color and a differentiated degree of culture, has long been a constant in nineteenth and twentieth-century scientific research. There is a marked physical resemblance between the (non-Austronesian) populations of the ancient Sahul (Australian Aboriginals and Papuans of New Guinea) and the Melanesians. Current genetic research confirms a similar genetic origin.

The languages spoken by Melanesians and Polynesians are, however, Austronesian, and there is no marked linguistic break between the two zones. The former clear separation between the two populations has therefore had to be revised.

Today, the Melanesian/Polynesian opposition is strongly questioned. It is based on nineteenth-century racial and ethnic stereotypes (black skin versus copper skin; "frizzy" or "woolly" hair versus "wavy" hair; "Melanesian cannibal" versus "good Polynesian savage"...), which are now outdated because they are unscientific.

For example, genetic analysis has shown that the so-called "Polynesians" were not only of Asian origin but also partly Melanesian. According to this study, now called into question, "the ancestors of the Polynesians were originally from Asia / Taiwan, but they did not cross Melanesia quickly; rather, they mixed extensively with the Melanesians, leaving behind their genes [in the Melanesians], and incorporating many Melanesian genes before colonizing the Pacific". These cross-influences were quantified by studying the genes of "400 Polynesians from 8 island groups, compared with over 900 people from populations [...] in Melanesia, South and East Asia and Australia, using the Y chromosome (NRY) and mitochondrial DNA (mtDNA)". The Y chromosome is inherited from the father, and therefore provides information on the genetic origin of the male founders of a population, while mitochondrial DNA, inherited from the mother, provides information on the genetic origin of the female founders of a population.

Thus, in the sample of 400 Polynesians, 65.8% of Y chromosomes (male) are Melanesian, 28.3% are Asian and 5.9% are undetermined by the study. In very reverse order, the mitochondrial DNA (of female origin) of the Polynesian individuals in the study is 6% of Melanesian origin, 93.8% of Asian origin, and 0.2% of undetermined origin28. In addition to the long passage of speakers of Austronesian languages from Asia through Melanesia before colonizing Polynesia, these data also suggest "a high degree of mixing among Polynesians, with more Melanesian men than women, perhaps due to the matrilocal residence [the man goes to live with his wife] ancestral to Polynesian society".

However, more recent genetic analyses have called this hypothesis into question, and rehabilitated the so-called "express train" hypothesis, developed as early as 1985 by archaeologist Peter Bellwood, according to which populations originating from Asia and forming the Lapita culture directly colonized these areas, without any real prior interbreeding with Melanesians (today notably Papua New Guinea). According to this alternative hypothesis, interbreeding is much more recent.

Today, the general pattern of Austronesian migration to Polynesia seems fairly solid: a migration towards Melanesia and the coasts of New Guinea, where populations of Asian and Melanesian/Papuan origins mixed and acculturated, followed by a migration of groups that remained more Asian in appearance towards the east and Polynesia.

=== Prehistoric contacts with Australia ===
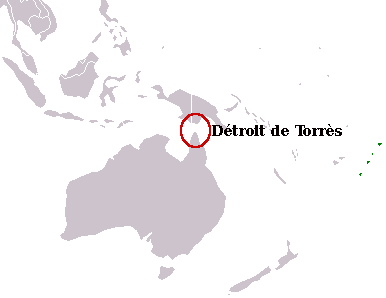
The Torres Strait, whose languages show Austronesian influences.

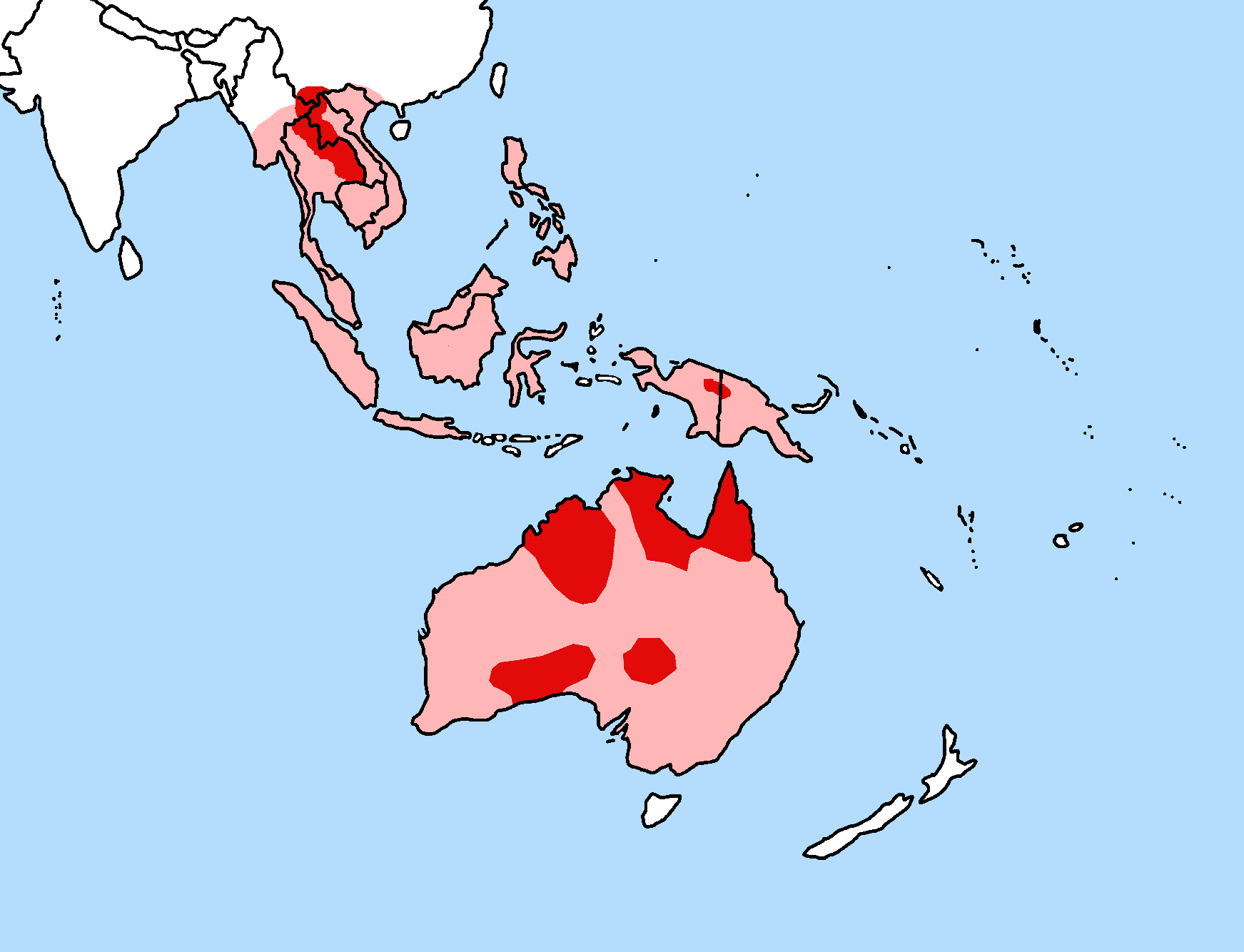
Dingo distribution map.

Austronesians likely had some contact with Australia, though they never established permanent settlements there. Evidence of this contact can be seen in the presence of Austronesian loanwords in the languages of some Torres Strait Islander groups located north of mainland Australia. These islands are linguistically diverse, with some communities speaking Papuan languages and others speaking Australian Aboriginal languages.

The presence of dingoes across Southeast Asia and Australia is intriguing. Dingoes, a type of feral dog, are found throughout the region, from Thailand to New Guinea, following a path similar to some Austronesian migrations. However, the exact timeline of their arrival in Australia remains unclear. While it's possible sporadic contact between mainland Australia and Southeast Asia could have facilitated their introduction, other explanations exist.

Fossil evidence suggests that dingoes arrived in Australia around 4,000 to 5,000 years ago, and spread to all parts of the Australian continent and its islands, with the exception of Tasmania. These dates coincide with those of the arrival of Austronesian navigators in the Indonesia-New Guinea area. But while Dingo demonstrates probable contacts, these had no known demographic, cultural or linguistic influence.

=== The advance eastwards to Polynesia ===
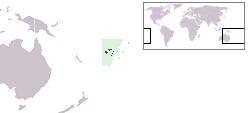
To the east of Melanesia, Fiji, the probable dispersal center of the first Polynesians (perhaps the famous Hawaiki of oral tradition).

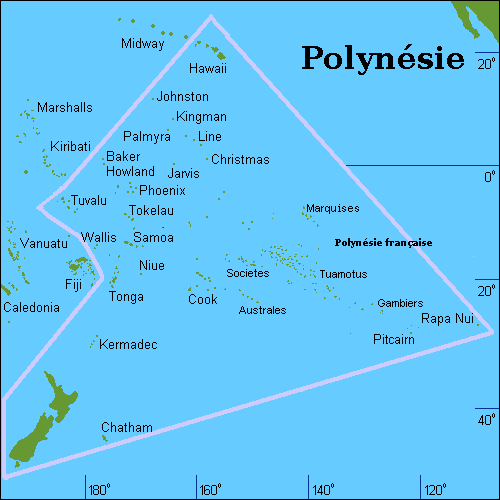
The Polynesian triangle.

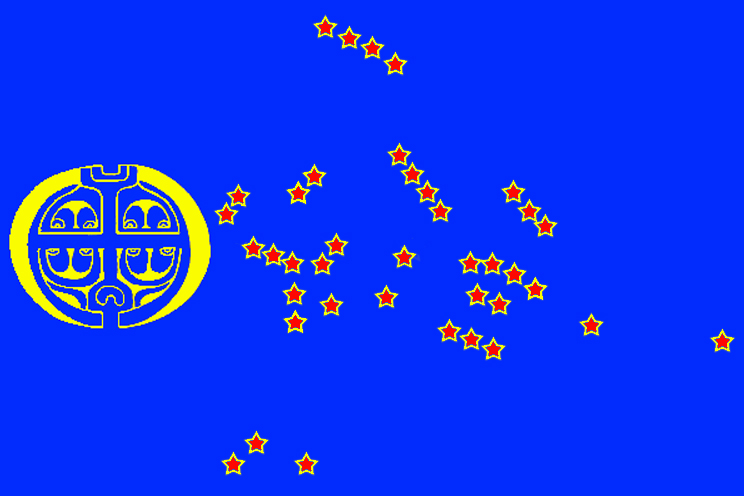
In this unofficial Polynesian flag on sale in Honolulu stores, the mythical Polynesian island of origin, Hawaiki, is represented by a petroglyph in golden yellow, and the main real islands by stars.

Genetic studies seem to demonstrate that "Fiji played a crucial role in the history of Polynesia: humans probably first migrated to Fiji, and the subsequent colonization of Polynesia probably originated there". Linguistics points in the same direction, as the languages of Fiji and Polynesia all belong to the same Oceanic sub-group, Fijian-Polynesian. Austronesians settled in Fiji around 1500 BC. However, the Lapita populations of Wallis, Futuna, Tonga, and Samoa gradually distinguished themselves from those present in Fiji.

Based on archaeology, ethnology, and linguistics, Patrick Kirch and Robert Green conclude that these islands formed the "ancestral Polynesian society": for around seven centuries, in the 1st millennium BC, they shared a common culture and spoke the same language, proto-Polynesian. This was the birth of Polynesian culture and the beginning of migration to Eastern Polynesia.

==== Reasons for eastward migration ====
Researchers wondered what could have driven these populations from Melanesia ever further eastwards, even though the prevailing winds and currents were against them.

The Austronesian migration, spanning over 3,000 years, was a slow and deliberate process due to prevailing headwinds. However, these winds weren't entirely unwelcome. Their double-hulled canoes, known as waʻa kaulua or vaʻa pahi, were impressive sailing vessels (according to oral tradition and archaeological evidence). These boats, capable of holding up to fifty passengers, were limited in provisions. However, sailing against the wind offered a crucial advantage: if they missed land, they could return home relatively quickly with the tailwind at their backs. This ability to retreat and resupply proved essential for navigating the vast Pacific Ocean.

The disadvantage of sailing with a headwind also needs to be weighed up in the light of experiments carried out on board replicas. These show that while the pahi did indeed sail very poorly against the wind, they were very comfortable sailing on the beam. Given the direction of the prevailing winds, particularly the south-easterly trade winds, it's easy to imagine either zigzag crossings or crossings at 70 or 80 degrees to the wind. Upwind sailing was therefore perfectly possible, albeit slowed by the need to sail with crosswinds.

According to New Zealand ethnologist Elsdon Best, the wind was not the only means of propulsion for these boats, and its contrary regime was therefore not prohibitive. "Although sails were used by Māori navigators, paddling was the most common method".

The Society Islands were not reached until around 300 AD and served as a dispersal area. This dispersal took place northwards (the Hawaiian Islands reached around 500), eastwards (Easter Island reached around 900), and southwards (New Zealand reached around 1100).

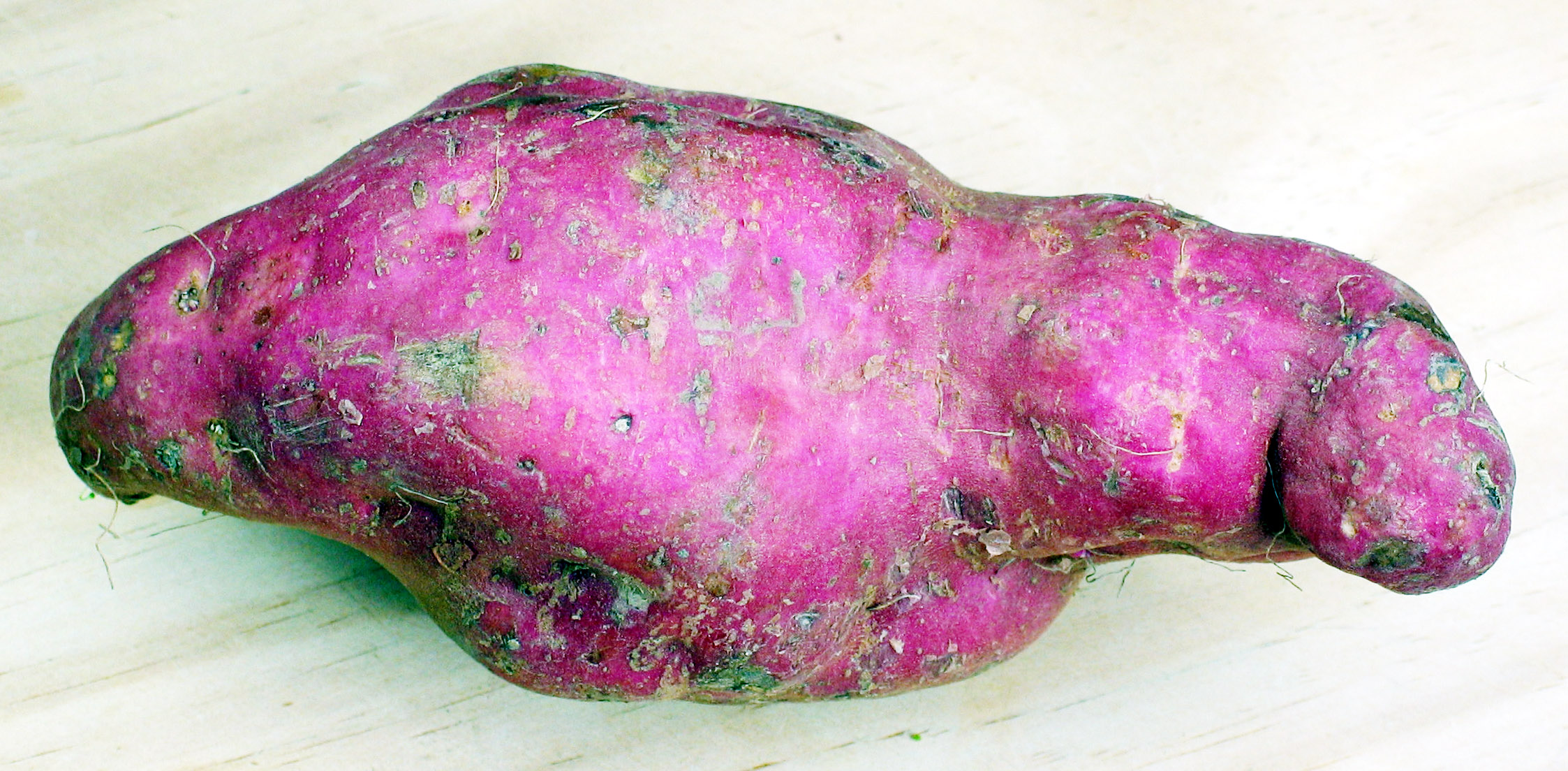
The sweet potato, a clue to ancient contacts between Polynesia and South America.

In the Far East, beyond Easter Island, it is now accepted that the Polynesians reached South America. The sweet potato, a perennial plant native to this continent (or possibly Central America), is found throughout Polynesia, where it has been cultivated for some 5,000 years. The Quechua term for sweet potato, qumar, is thus close to that used in most Polynesian languages ('ūmara in Tahitian, kumara in Māori, umala in Samoan, etc.).

In 2007, archaeologists on the Pacific coast of South America (in Chile) also found chicken bones that predate the arrival of Europeans, and whose genetic analysis clearly shows their kinship with Polynesian chicken lines. Chickens are native to South Asia and did not live in America. For a long time, it was thought that Europeans had brought the chicken to America, which is true outside the areas of contact with Polynesians. While these contacts had an impact on the agriculture and breeding of both populations, the existence of Amerindian settlements probably did not allow the establishment of Austronesian colonies.

=== Intermediate migration hypothesis (12,000 / 8,000 A.P.) ===
Several hypotheses, little developed to date by scientific research due to the absence of archaeological traces and convincing linguistic data, suggest the possibility of intermediate waves.

These could have been migrations between the aboriginal and Austronesian settlements, from which the Papuan populations would have descended, or a first wave of Asian migrations, predating the Austronesian ones, whose beginning is now dated to around 6,000 years ago.

In 2011, Pedro Soares and his team published a population genetics paper indicating that the female lineage (mitochondrial DNA) of Polynesians showed specific South Asian patterns dating back 8,000 years (before a dispersal phase from the Bismarck Islands 6,000 years ago), i.e. before the arrival of archaeological cultures identified as Austronesian in Melanesia. Researchers therefore consider that the settlement of South Asian migrants in the region predates the arrival of Austronesians, and that "small Middle Holocene [population] movements from South Asian islands probably transmitted Austronesian languages to long-established Southeast Asian settlements in the Bismarcks". However, this thesis is still based on purely genetic dating, which is often imprecise and is not yet clearly supported by archaeological evidence.

=== Megalithism ===
There are a good number of megalithic sites, including Haʻamonga ʻa Maui, Langi, Leluh, Moaï, Nan Madol, Odalmelech, and Latte stone.

== Austronesian sailing ==
Nothing is known about the navigation techniques of the settlers of the first wave of colonization, except that they must have existed. Indeed, settlement of the Sahul and New Guinea islands was achieved by crossing seas, such as the Wallacea.

More is known about Austronesian navigation techniques, which were still widely used when Westerners arrived.

The scale of the crossings, sometimes spanning thousands of kilometers, astonished the first European observers. Indeed, such distances and the very low density of land in the Pacific seemed to make successful voyages unlikely. To find an island, navigation by chance is largely insufficient. The Oceanians therefore developed a highly sophisticated navigational science.

=== Pirogues ===
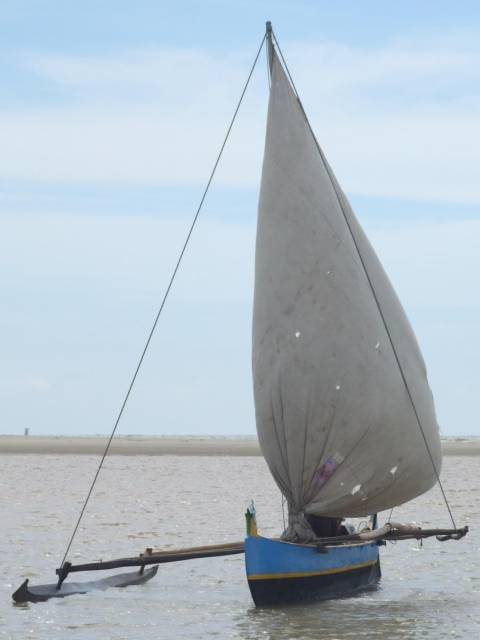
Outrigger pirogue, Madagascar.

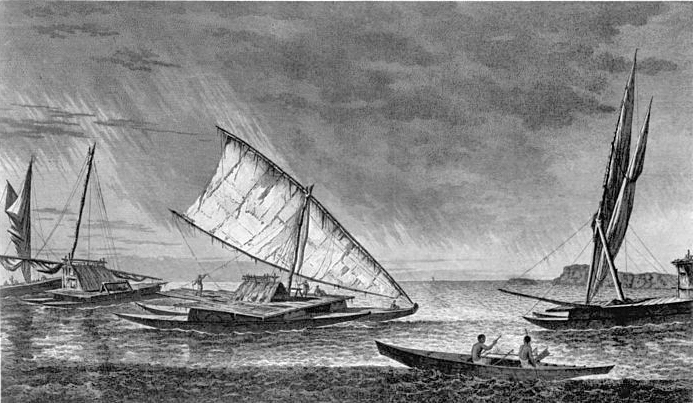
Tonga catamaran with superstructure. 1774.

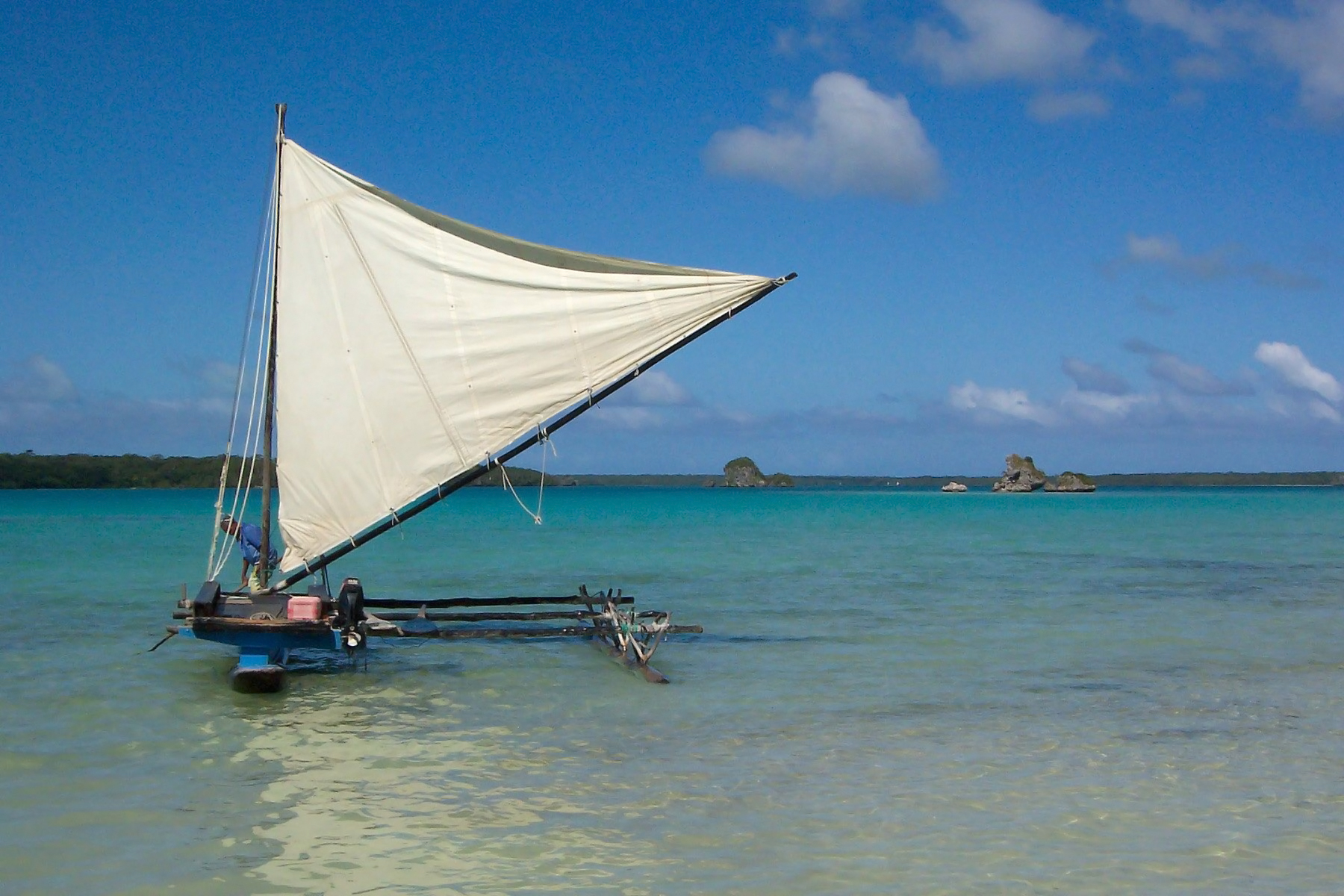
Outrigger pirogue (prao) from Ile des Pins (New Caledonia, Melanesia).

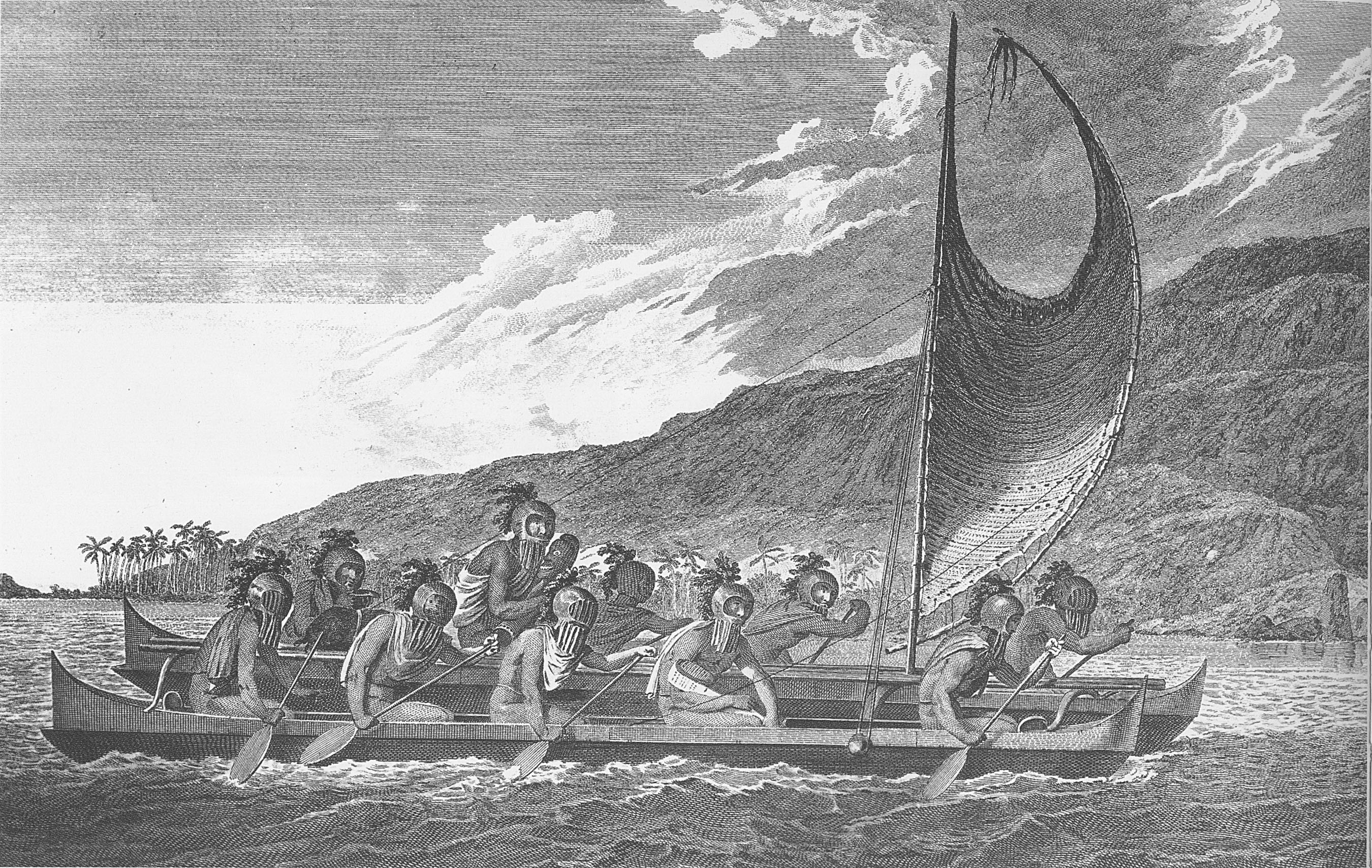
Double-hulled Polynesian catamaran (Hawaii).

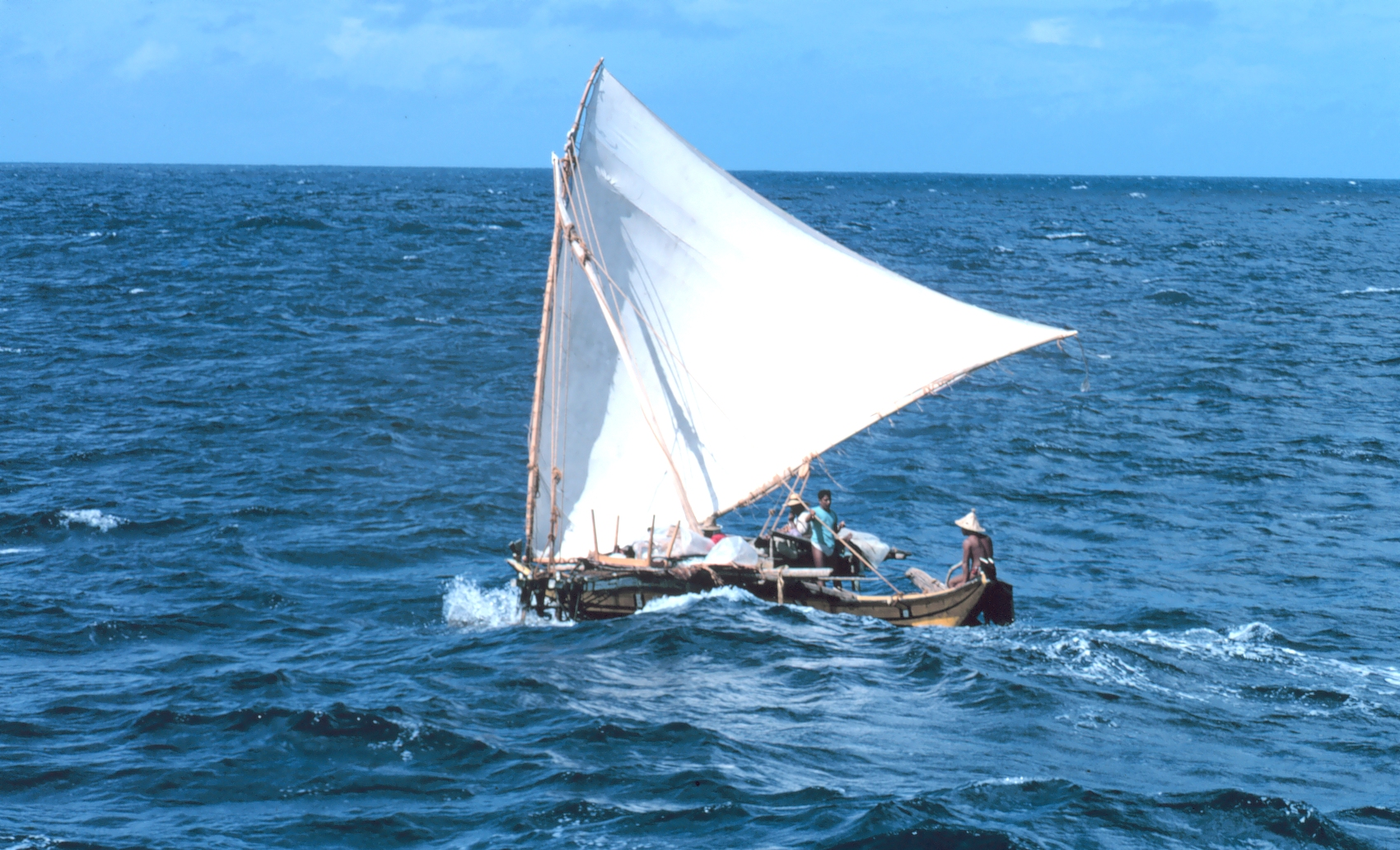
Outrigger pirogue from Micronesia.

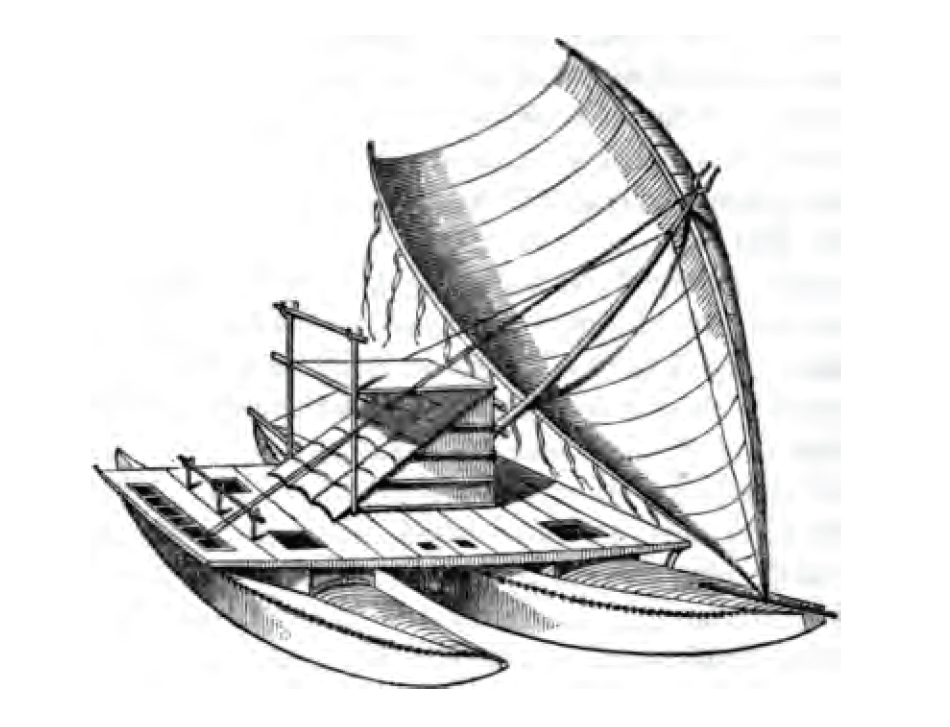
Melanesian catamaran (Fiji)

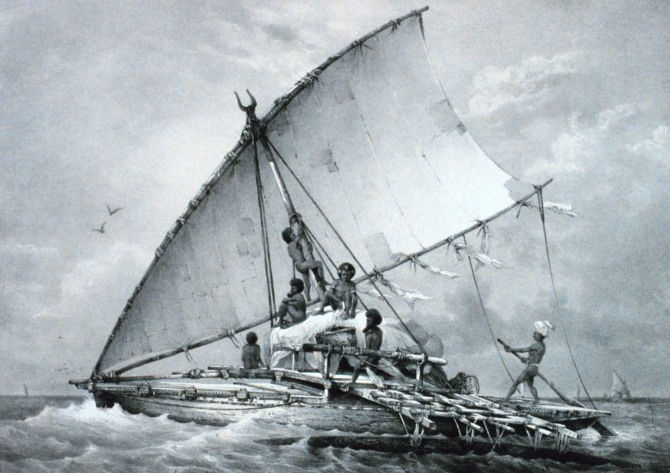
Outrigger pirogue (prao) from Fiji, Melanesia).

As Elsdon Best pointed out in 1925, "some of the types of vessel used by the older generations have long since disappeared, and no descriptions of them exist". The author notes, however, that the vessels identified by the first Europeans in the region were of three types: single-hulled pirogues, double-hulled pirogues (catamaran), and single-hulled outrigger pirogues (Proa).

Single-hulled pirogues seem ill-suited to the high seas. Indeed, the absence of a keel makes them highly unstable in the event of waves or crosswinds, which can capsize them. Still in use, they are mainly used for river fishing, in the lagoon, or just beyond.

Catamarans and proas can be used to replace the missing keel, preventing the pirogues from capsizing in heavy seas or crosswinds. Praos are relatively fragile, however, and don't seem to have been used for offshore sailing. It seems that large catamarans, made up of two large pirogues joined, were the dominant means of offshore navigation for the Austronesians, at least in historical times. Māori oral tradition recalls a fleet of 13 large double pirogues at the origin of the settlement of New Zealand. However, Best does not rule out other traditions that speak of ocean crossings in single pirogues or outrigger canoes.

The catamarans seem to have been of two types: simple pirogues temporarily joined in pairs, and permanent catamarans, more solidly bound together. It was undoubtedly the second, more solid type that was used for ocean voyages, but these vessels ceased to be used with the arrival of Westerners, and their construction details are relatively poorly known. Sizes of 15 to 20 meters were easily achieved, and they could carry several dozen passengers. The largest were covered by a deck "joined to the body of the pirogue by ligatures". The total width of the two hulls and the deck could reach 3 or 4 meters, with a decked space between the two hulls. Huts could be built on the decks of catamarans, and there is a Tahitian term for such a construction: farepora. Numerous 19th-century engravings bear witness to these superstructures. "The largest vessels were around thirty meters long: the size of Cook's ship", but this was a maximum, as the hulls were made from a single tree trunk (Takamaka, for example), and the size of the offshore catamarans was limited by the size of the trees used to build them.

"Ten or fifteen of these double pirogues could form a powerful fleet", and the travel report Stories of bank peninsula speaks of a fleet of 29 Māori vessels "composed of vessels specially adapted for ocean voyages". Anchors were made of large stones. Even more important was "the armada assembled in May 1774 in Tahiti to attack the neighboring island of Mo'orea [...]. This 'Invincible Armada' consisted of one hundred and sixty double-hulled ships and as many supply pirogues".

In New Zealand at least, double-hulled offshore pirogues probably disappeared around the middle of the nineteenth century, probably in competition with Western craft which rendered them obsolete. Elsewhere in the Pacific, numerous reconstructions have been built over the last thirty years (Hokule'a in Hawaii, Takitumu and Te Au o Tonga in the Cook Islands...). Simple pirogues and proas, especially the smaller, simpler-to-build ones, have survived much longer, for fishing or local travel, and can still be built.

Finally, the fairly wide geographical spread of the above-mentioned types of craft, from Insulinde (the Malay archipelago) to Polynesia, and from Micronesia to Melanesia, suggests that the types of craft discovered by Westerners are quite ancient, even if their exact appearance cannot be specified.

=== Offshore sailing ===
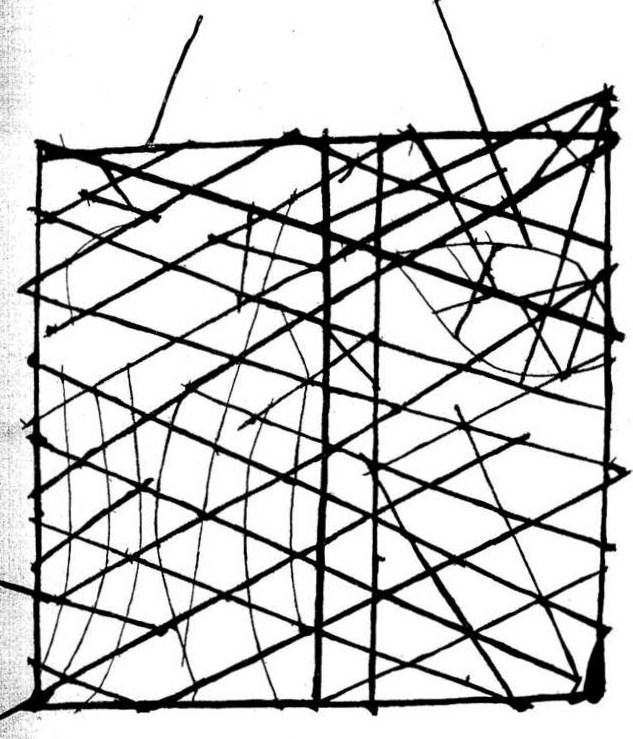
Micronesian navigation instrument showing wind, wave and island directions, circa 1904

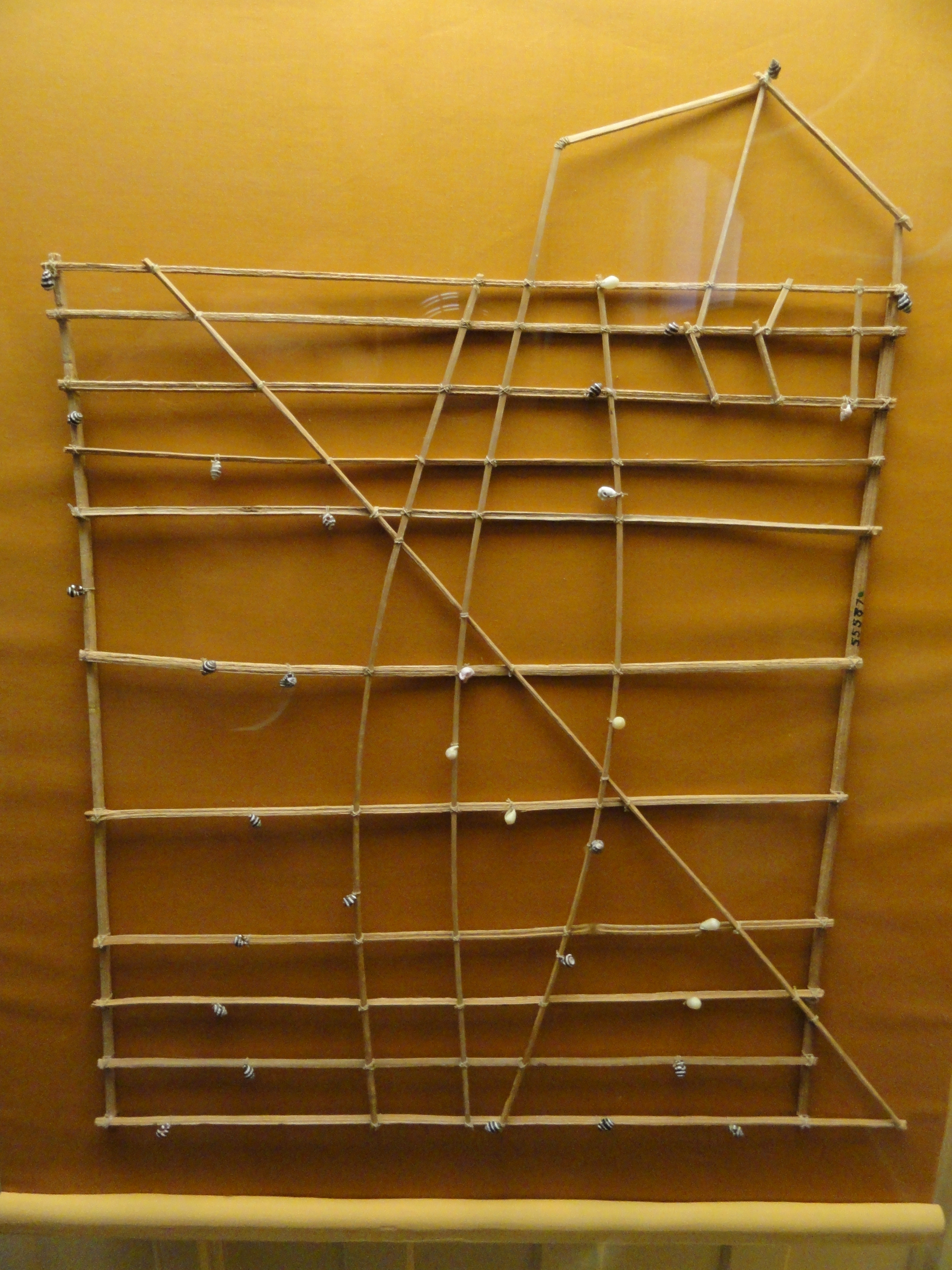
Polynesian navigation chart of the Marshall Islands, showing winds, currents and islands.

Deep-sea navigation was widely practiced by Austronesians, not only for voyages of exploration but also for long-distance trading voyages, such as those between Micronesia and Vanuatu. As no compass or sextant was available, navigation was based on a variety of indications.

The first was the position of the sun, which was used to identify the cardinal points: the sun rises in the east, sets in the west, and is in the south at noon (if you're in the northern hemisphere), or in the north (if you're in the southern hemisphere).

At night, the stars are also a valuable landmark. The Pole star points north in the northern hemisphere, while the Southern Cross points south in the southern hemisphere. For the other stars that move across the sky, the pilot's acquired skill and consideration of the seasons enable empirical navigation.

Skilled navigators could leverage swells and prevailing winds as remarkably stable directional references. This knowledge is even reflected in many Oceanic languages. For instance, in Rarotongian, "raro" refers to an east–west wind (the trade winds), "tonga" to a northerly wind, "tonga opue" to a south-southeasterly wind, and "tokerau" to a northwesterly wind. These terms demonstrate the deep understanding that Oceanic peoples developed for navigating vast distances using celestial bodies, swell patterns, and wind direction.

By combining these various indications, Austronesian navigators were able to take their trading and exploration expeditions to the open sea.

=== Approaching the islands ===
Given the small size of some islands, it's not enough to get close to them -you have to find them precisely. Navigators used a wide range of markers for this "coastal" location.

The presence of specific seabird species can be an indicator of nearby land. While some birds may venture far from land for extended periods, others remain closer to the shoreline. By identifying the species, sailors can potentially estimate the distance to land before it is visually observable. Furthermore, some bird species return to land in the evening after foraging for fish. Following the direction of their flight may also lead to the discovery of land.

The color of the sea also betrays the nature of the seabed, and a decrease in depth, by altering the color of the ocean, can indicate the proximity of land; but the rise of the seabed not only alters the color of the water, it also modifies the swell (a phenomenon known as fetch) and currents.

The approach of land is also marked by the floating of plant debris, torn from the shore.

On some islands, inland water bodies (lagoons, in particular) cause evaporation, resulting in the formation of a more or less permanent cloud, centered on the island and visible from a great distance. Some Polynesian islands have even been given names evoking this phenomenon, such as Motu Aotea, "Island of the White Cloud", in New Zealand, or Aotearoa, "Long White Cloud", for New Zealand itself.

By playing on these diverse indications, Austronesian Neolithic navigators were able to successfully approach the land they were looking for, after days or weeks of deep-sea sailing.

=== Voyages of exploration, trade and empires ===
Oceanic navigation has been used for voyages of exploration and settlement, but also, in certain areas of Oceania, for commercial voyages.

The oldest populated islands (Philippines and Insulindia) have been extensively involved in trade since the Middle Ages, and even since antiquity, with India, the Middle East, and China, but these archipelagos are not part of Oceania in the strict sense.

Australia was not part of any discernible Austronesian trade network until modern times, although the presence of dingoes attests to some limited contacts with the outside world. New Guinea is broadly in the same situation, although some coastal regions traded regularly with neighboring Melanesian islands, and today often speak Austronesian rather than Papuan languages.

More locally, however, Papuans and Australian Aboriginals have traded across the Torres Strait islands, where their populations mingled (some islands are Papuan-speaking, others are Aboriginal-speaking, with an Austronesian vocabulary showing ancient contacts).

It should also be noted that fairly regular contacts were established between Macassan (or Makassar) fishermen from southern Indonesia (Celebes or Sulawesi) and Aboriginal people from Arnhem Land, starting in the 18th century, and perhaps even the 15th.

The islands of Oceania proper (Melanesia, Micronesia, and Polynesia) experienced different situations. The more outlying islands, such as New Zealand and Easter Island, don't seem to have taken part in trade networks after their colonization. The more central islands participated in local networks (within archipelagos) or more general ones (between archipelagos), as evidenced by archaeological traces.

But even more than trade, the great oceanic fleets enabled the constitution of empires. For example, "the power of the Tonga monarchy reached its apogee in the thirteenth century. At that time, the chiefdoms exercised political influence as far afield as Samoa". This empire, the Tuʻi Tonga Empire, centered on "the island of Tongatapu led to the gradual occupation of the majority of the islands of Western Polynesia, with the imposition of Tongan governors and new chiefs".

In Polynesia itself, "the tradition of inter-island voyages [in fact, beyond the archipelagos] was lost by Cook's time [late 18th century]; but the geographical knowledge then expressed by a priest of the Society Islands proves that their memory was still alive. On his first voyage in 1769, Cook took on board Tupaia, a priest from Raiatea (Leeward Islands). Although he had only traveled within the Society archipelago, Tupaia was able to name 130 islands and place 74 of them on a map: to the west of the Society archipelago, Fiji, Samoa, and Tonga are still in doubt, but to the east, part of the Marquesas and the Tuamotus can surely be recognized on Tupaia's map. Tupaia ignored Hawaii (then unknown to J. Cook), Easter Island, and New Zealand. Throughout his voyages with Cook, much to everyone's astonishment, Tupaia was able to point in the direction of the Society Archipelago, but he never explained how he did it".

== Oceania settlement, fauna and flora ==
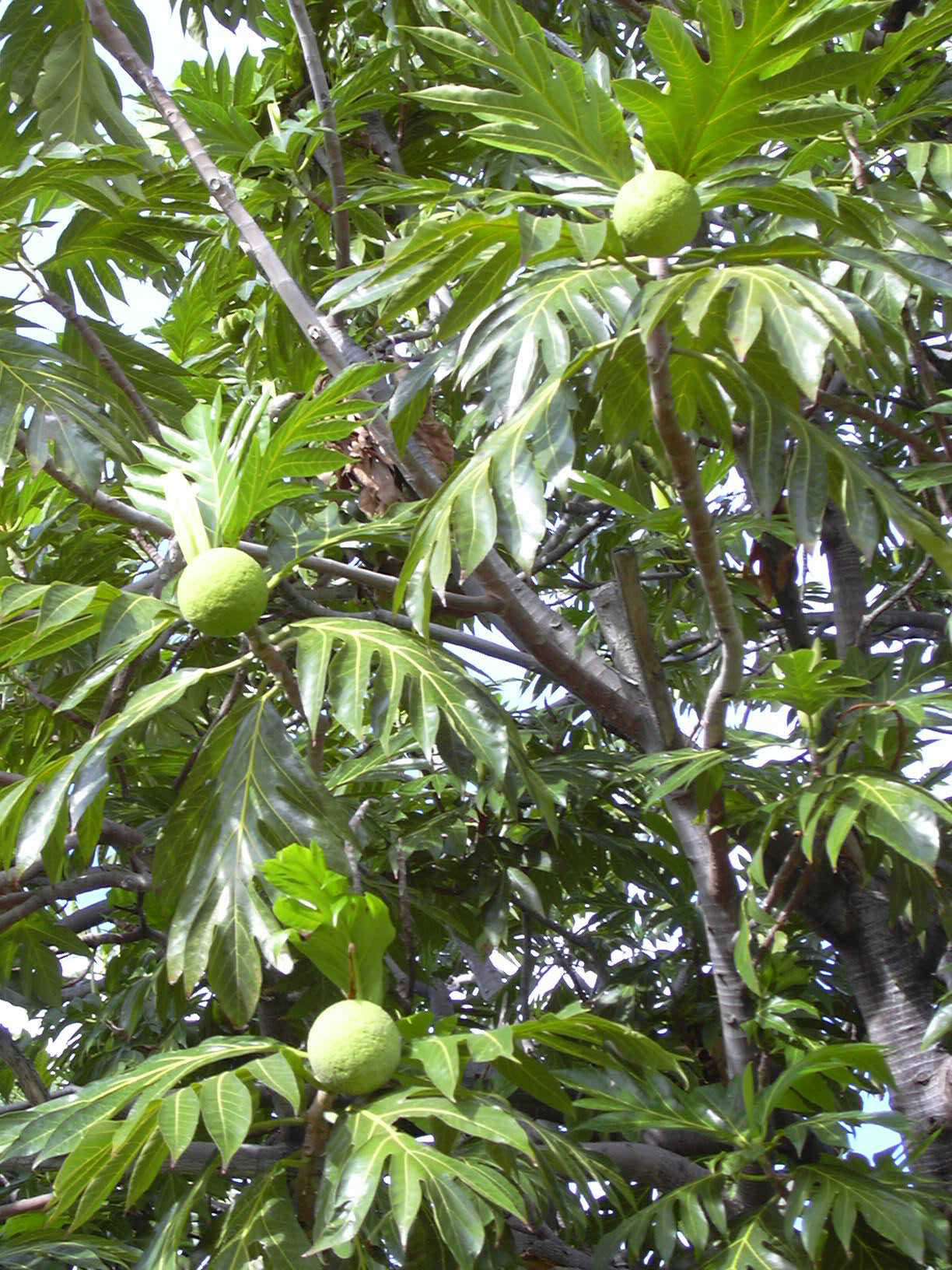
Breadfruit tree.

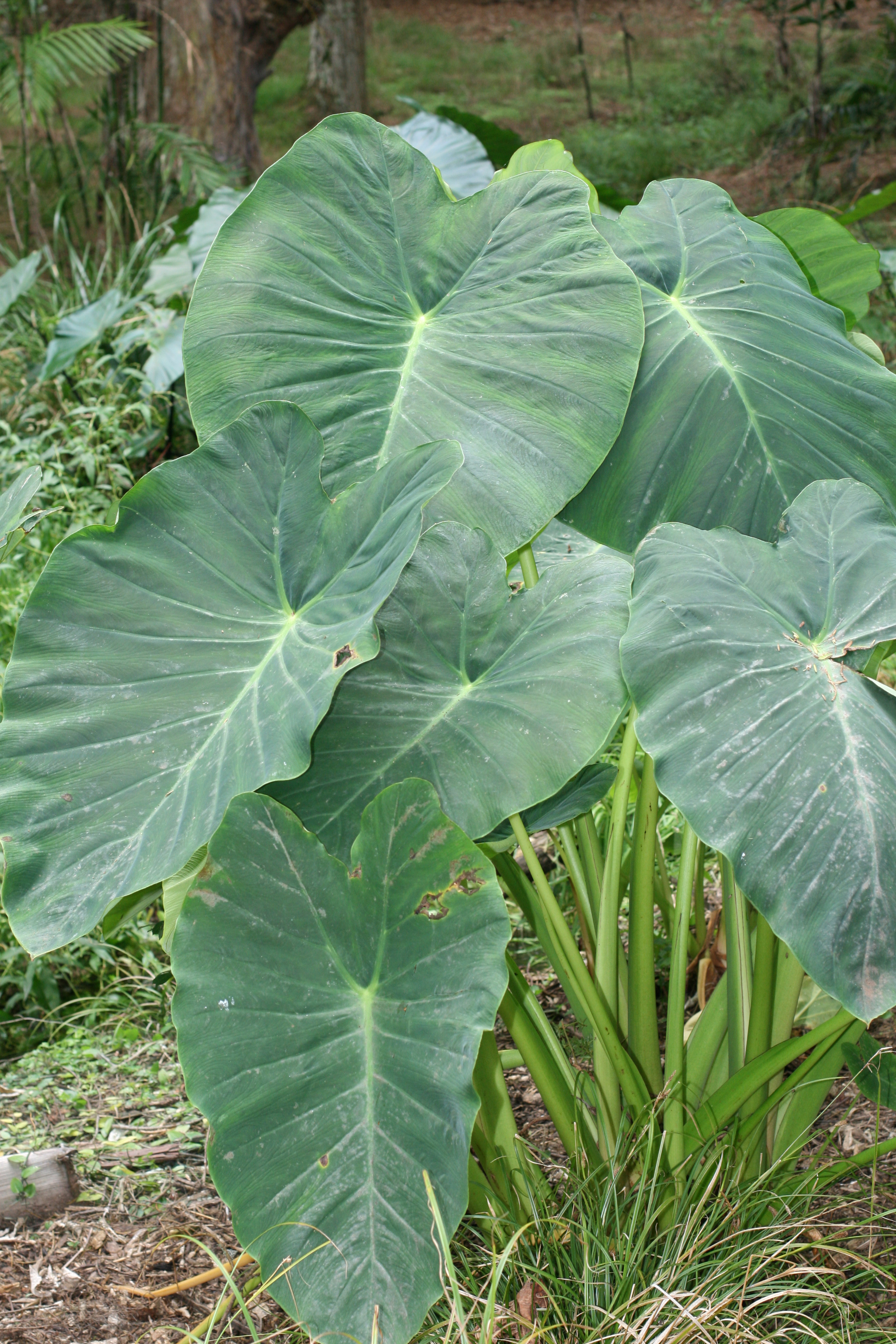
Taro, an edible tuber

The settlement of Oceania was not just a human movement. It was also a movement of animals and, above all, plants, brought by settlers, more or less voluntarily.

The first wave of settlers had no notable influence. They were hunter-gatherers who brought with them neither plants nor domesticated animals.

Second-wave Austronesian settlers, on the other hand, were herders and horticulturists and brought with them plants and animals. Many of the Pacific islands were very isolated, with little diversity of flora and fauna. "More than reaching the tiny lands of the Great Ocean, it was difficult to thrive there: indeed, they were devoid of almost everything. It was indeed the Polynesians who, by transporting more than eighty plants over ten thousand kilometers, transformed them into as many "New Cytheras". But their Austronesian predecessors had already been at work, as "talented horticulturists. They had begun to enrich the poor islands of the south-west Pacific with plants transported over generations from South-East Asia and New Guinea: yams, various araceae, breadfruit, and sugar cane". Introduced by a man on his travels, the vast majority of pre-European plants originated in South-East Asia: breadfruit, taro, coconut, yam (Dioscorea alata), Tahitian chestnut, Syzygium malaccense, Tacca leontopetaloides, (Note: Also known as Polynesian cassava.) sugarcane, banana, June plum, pandanus, Cordyline fruticose, candlenut, giant taro.

With the plants also came animals, such as chickens, another native of Southeast Asia, along with the first mammals. Indeed, "there are no indigenous mammals in Polynesia. All were introduced voluntarily or involuntarily by man. Dogs and pigs were brought by the first Polynesians during their migrations, along with rats in the bottom of their pirogues".

Some introductions had negative effects. For example, the dingo, introduced into Australia 3,500 to 4,000 years ago, seems to have had a detrimental impact on certain Australian animals (such as its potential competitors, the thylacine (marsupial wolf) (Note: The Thylacine Museum concludes that the dingo may have played a role in the animal's disappearance from Australia, but no certainty is possible.) and the Tasmanian devil), causing them to regress or even disappear.

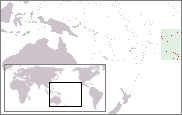
Location of the Cook Islands in Central Polynesia, with traces of the first sweet potatoes.

While almost all the plants and animals brought by the Austronesians logically came from their native Southeast Asia, there is one exception: the sweet potato. This is clearly of South or Central American origin. However, "charred remains of tubers [...] have [...] been discovered in the soil of a habitat dating from the 10th century in Mangaia (Cook Islands)", and by the time Westerners arrived, the tuber was a widespread food throughout Polynesia. This exception attests to the fact that Polynesian navigators reached South America long ago (even before the year 1000) and brought the sweet potato back with them.

== Discontinued theories ==
From the end of the 18th century onwards, the question of the settlement of Oceania gave rise to many theories, now abandoned.

=== The sunken continent ===
One of the first explanations given for the settlement of Oceania was the existence of a sunken continent, the "Pacifide", the mythical counterpart of Atlantis. According to this theory, the Oceanians were the descendants of the inhabitants of a continent that has now disappeared, of which only a few peaks remain: the Pacific islands. This theory was first formulated by James Forster, the naturalist on James Cook's third circumnavigation. It was later taken up by the Belgian-French Jacques-Antoine Moerenhout in his Voyage aux îles du grand océan (1837).

After 1926, Colonel James Churchward popularized it in a different form and under a different name in a book entitled The Lost Continent of Mu, in which this eccentric military man even attempted to map this imaginary continent, which he gave a Polynesian name: Mu Ra Roa (mu: variety of fish; ra: deictic expressing distance in time; roa: large). In Polynesia, islands are often named after fish (e.g. Te ika a Maui, the Māori name for New Zealand's North Island). The book was so successful that the author published two sequels, also translated into French: Les Enfants de Mu, and L'Univers secret de Mu

=== The myth of the lost tribe of Israel ===
The "lost tribe of Israel" is one of the many nineteenth-century hypotheses about the region's settlement. This was the case, for example, of the Reverend Richard Taylor in Te Ika a Maui, or New Zealand and its Inhabitants (1855), and of the Briton Godfrey Charles Mundy, who spent several months in New Zealand in the 1840s. He writes: "It is said that many of their customs, civil and religious, correspond to a remarkable degree with those of the Jews. The facial features of many Māori bear a strong resemblance to those of the ancient race, the same exorbitant, shining eye, the same coarse, aquiline nose, and the same fine, sensuous mouth. (...) Are the Māori descended from one of the lost tribes of Israel? In this description, we find all the archetypes of traditional Jewish imagery, the "aquiline nose", the "exorbitant, shining eye" and so on.

However, this myth was also claimed by the Māori themselves through the syncretic Te Nakahi movement, whose leaders such as Papahurihia, later known as Te Atua Wera or Wero, claimed descent from Moses. First reported in the Bay of Islands in July 1833, then later in Hokianga (in the far north of New Zealand), the birth of Te Nakahi coincided with the multiplication of the first Māori baptisms.

Blending Old Testament precepts (observance of the Jewish Shabbat) with ancestral Māori rites, its followers saw in this affiliation with the Hurai (Jews in Māori), the affirmation of an identity undermined by the missions. This cult also had a major influence on the Hōne Heke revolt in the north of the country and the Māori royalist movement of the 1850s, with the first Māori king Potatau Te Wherowhero claiming descent from the last kings of Israel.

=== The Indo-European origins of the Oceanians ===
Another major hypothesis on the origin of Polynesians (there was little interest in Melanesians at the time) appeared in 1885. It was the work of Abraham Fornander, who postulated the Indo-European origin of the Polynesians.

In volume 3 of Account of the Polynesian Race, devoted to what was then known as philology, in other words the study of languages, he attempted to demonstrate the existence of phonetic and syntactic coincidences between Polynesian and Indo-European languages.

This was the peak of Indo-European research. The same year, 1885, saw the publication of another work entitled Aryan Maori, in which author Edouard Tregear was even more precise in his demonstration. According to him, an Aryan population settled between the Caspian Sea and the northern slopes of the Himalayas split into two groups 4,000 years ago. One headed west to settle in Western Europe, the other south via Persia and India. From there, some would have continued further east to Southeast Asia and the Pacific Islands. Tregear wished to demonstrate a common origin between the British settlers and the Maori populations. His work was strongly criticized from the outset, for the weakness of the arguments put forward, and then in the 1970s as reflecting an ethnocentric and colonialist ideology presenting Polynesians as "white savages" who could easily be assimilated into Western culture

=== American settlement ===
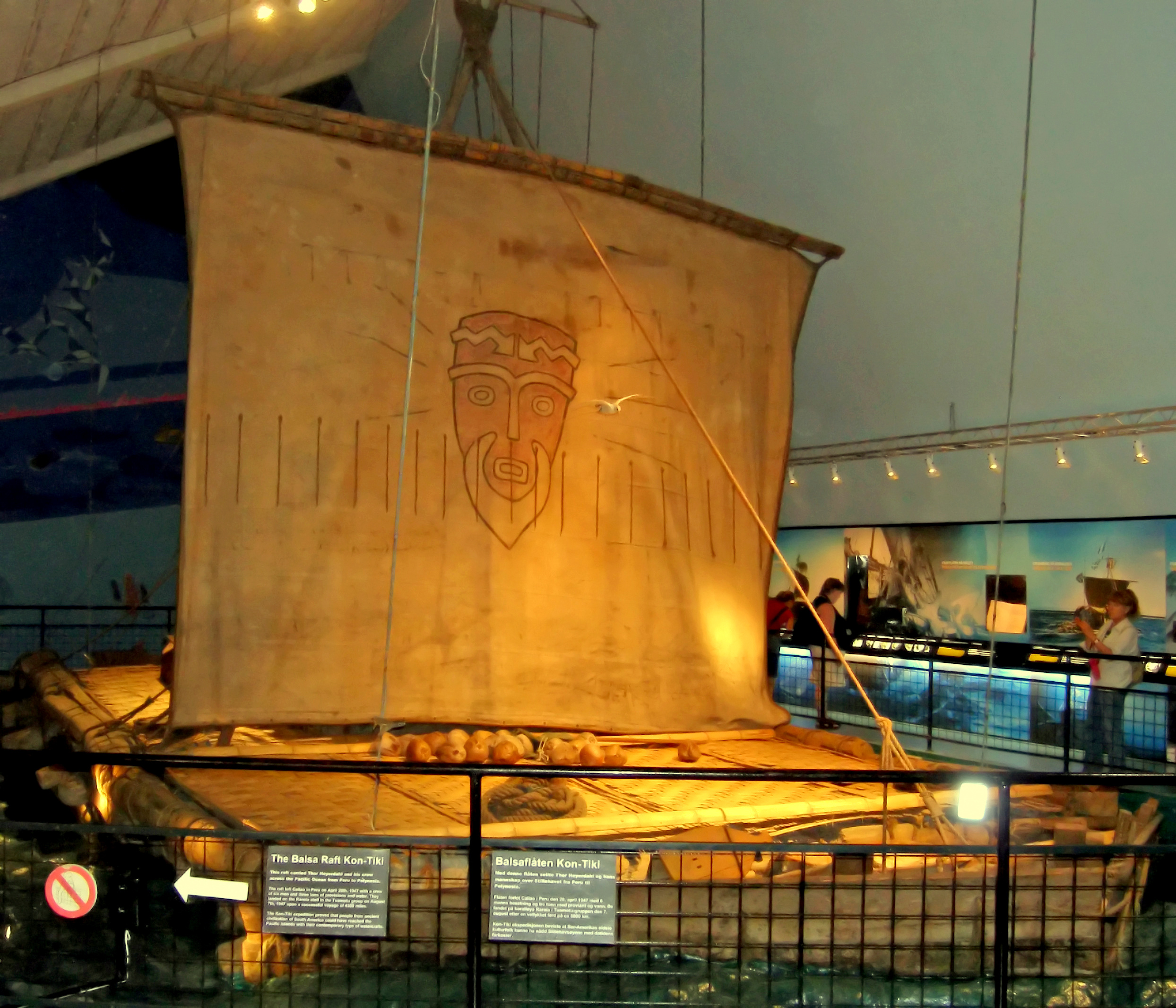
The Kon-Tiki at the Kon-Tiki Museum in Oslo.

In the 1950s, a young Norwegian doctoral student, Thor Heyerdahl, postulated a Native American origin for the Polynesians. He based his theory on many points:

- Firstly, there were climatic reasons. It was simpler for these travelers to follow the prevailing winds, which in this area blow from east to west than to go against them, as navigators from Asia would have to do;
- A certain amount of archaeological data also seems to support this view. Lithic tools reminiscent of those of the Oceanians have been found on South American sites;
- Finally, the sweet potato is found throughout the Pacific, and ethnobotany has demonstrated its American origin.

Heyerdahl also drew on the oral traditions of the peoples of America and Polynesia.

Heyerdahl and five crew members, including Bengt Danielsson, attempt to reach Tahiti from Peru on the Kon-Tiki raft, to demonstrate that Inca rafts, built from balsa, a porous wood, are capable of withstanding the high seas and making a crossing of several thousand nautical miles. Barely halfway across the journey, the balsa was so saturated with water that a piece, detached by the crew from a submerged section, sank. The use of balsa for such journeys is not without risk (The Kon Tiki Expedition, chapter IV, "trunks soak up water"). The Kon-Tiki expedition struggled to reach Raroia in the Tuamotu Islands.

Today, everyone agrees that there was contact between the Oceanians and the Amerindian populations of the South American continent (proven by the presence of the American sweet potato in Polynesia (or even by that of Polynesian chickens in South America if this 2007 discovery is definitively confirmed), but no one questions the Asian origin of the populations of the Pacific and Melanesia, as proven by modern linguistics, population genetics and ethnobotany.

Today, therefore, it is assumed that traces of prehistoric contact were left by Polynesian navigators in South America, and not by South Americans in Oceania.

== Annexes ==
=== Bibliography ===
==== General works ====
- De Quatrefages, Armand (1883). Hommes fossiles et hommes sauvages.
- Guiart, Jean (2000). Découverte de l'Océanie.I.Connaissance des îles. Nouméa: Haere Po. pp. 161–206.
- Guiart, Jean (2003). Découverte de l'Océanie.II.Connaissance des hommes. Nouméa: Haere Po. p. 276.
- Galipaud, Jean-Christophe; Lilley, Ian (1999). Le Pacifique, de 50000 à 2000 avant le présent : Actes du Colloque de 1996. IRD.
- Conte, Éric (1995). Tereraa : voyages et peuplement des îles du Pacifique. Tahiti: Éditions Polymages-Scoop. p. 43. ISBN 2-909790-04-5.
- Toullelan, Pierre-Yves; Gille, Bernard (1999). De la Conquête à l'exode : histoire des Océaniens et de leurs migrations dans le Pacifique. Papeete: Au Vent des îles. p. 344. ISBN 2-909790-59-2.
- Vinton Kirch, Patrick (1990). "La colonisation du Pacfique". La Recherche. 21 (225).
- Galipaud, Jean-Christophe; Lilley, Ian (2000). "Le Pacifique de 5000 à 2000 avant le présent : suppléments à l'histoire d'une colonisation (actes du colloque Vanuatu, 31 juillet-6 août 1996)". Collection Colloques et Séminaires. Paris: ORSTOM.

==== Austronesians ====
- Blust, Robert A. (1988). Austronesian root theory : an essay on the limits of morphology. Amsterdam. p. 190. ISBN 978-90-272-8209-5.
- Bellwood, Peter; Fox, James J.; Tryon, Darrell (1995). The Austronesians : Historical and Comparative Perspectives. Research School of Pacific and Asian Studies, Australian National University. ISBN 978-1-920942-85-4.
- Zheng, Chantal (1995). Les Austronésiens de Taïwan : à travers les sources chinoises. Paris: L'Harmattan. p. 254. ISBN 2-7384-3479-7.

==== Lapita ====
- Kirch, Patrick Vinton (1997). "The Lapita peoples : ancestors of the oceanic world". Journal de la Société des Océanistes. 106 (1). Blackwell Publishers: 103–106.
- Clark, G.R.; Anderson, A.; Sorovi-Vunidilo, T. (2002). The archaeology of Lapita dispersal in Oceania. Pandanus Books. ISBN 978-1-74076-010-2.
- Noury, Arnaud (2013). Le Lapita : À l'origine des sociétés d'Océanie. Paris: Lulu Eds.
- Noury, Arnaud; Galipaud, Jean-Christophe (2011). Les lapita, nomades du Pacifique (PDF). Marseille: IRD Editions. p. 127. ISBN 978-2-7099-1716-2.
- Noury, Arnaud (2005). "Le Reflet de l'âme lapita, archéologie du lapita en Océanie". Essai d'Interprétation des Décors des Poteries Lapita en Mélanesie et Polynésie Occidentale entre 3300 et 2700 bp. Versailles. p. 120.
- Sand, Christophe (1997). "Lapita : collection de poteries du site de Foué". Département Archéologie. Nouméa.

==== Polynesia ====
- Bellwood, Peter (1978). The Polynesians : prehistory of an Island People (1st ed.). Londres: Thames and Hudson. p. 175.
- Kirch, Patrick Vinton; Green, Roger C. (2001). "Hawaiki, Ancestral Polynesia : An Essay in Historical Anthropology". Cambridge University Press: 394. ISBN 978-0-511-06700-6.

=== Other ===
- Blust, Robert A. (1978). "The Proto-Oceanic palatals". Mémoire pour la Polynesian society. 35 (65). Wellington, Nouvelle-Zélande: 299.
- Neyret, Jean (1974). Pirogues océaniennes. Amis du Musée de la Marine.
- Sand, Christophe; Kirch, Patrick Vinton. "L'Expédition archéologique d'Edward W. Gifford et Richard Shutler Jr en Nouvelle-Calédonie au cours de l'année 1952". Service des musées et du patrimoine de Nouvelle-Calédonie. Nouméa: Département archéologie.

== See also ==
- Negrito
- Aboriginal Australians
- Pacific Islander
