= Kerevat Airfield =

Defunct airport in Papua New Guinea

- Part of the South West Pacific Theater of World War II
- Kerevat, New Britain
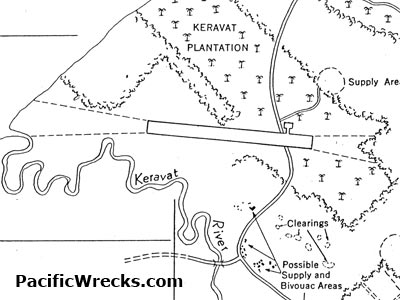
- Map of Kerevat Airfield and surroundings, May 26, 1943

Location
- Coordinates: 04°18′47″S 152°6′00″E

Site history
- Built: 1943
- Built by: Imperial Japanese

Kerevat Airfield (prewar: Tavilo Plantation; variant: "Keravat") was an aerodrome located near Kerevat, East New Britain province, Papua New Guinea. Situated on the northern coast, it was 13 miles (21 km) south west of Rabaul. The airfield was constructed by the Imperial Japanese in World War II during September 1943. Kerevat Airfield was neutralized by Allied Powers' air bombing from 1944, who ran missions on the airfield between June 20, 1943, and May 16, 1944. The airfield was abandoned after the cessation of hostilities; however, the airstrip is still visible.

== Structure ==
The airfield's single runway was located on Ataliklikun Bay 6 miles (9.7 km) east of Vunakanauwas. The runway was 4,800 feet (1,500 m) long and 400 feet (120 m) wide and ran parallel to the Keravat River in an east–west direction, to the southwest of Rabaul. It was not an all-weather concrete runway. Though the runway was upgraded, it was never fully operational, and its use was limited to crash landing as the airstrip, riddled with problems, was generally subject to drainage and other engineering problems, making it difficult for use for regular flight operations.

== World War II history ==
The 552nd Kōkūtai (D3A2 Val) unit was stationed here from December 18, 1943, to January 25, 1944. There were nine bombings of the airfield during the period June 20, 1943, to May 16, 1944, by American missions; these bombings were on June 20, 1943, by 13th Air Force B-24s; on February 22, 1944, by 13th AF B-24s, with fighter escorts; on February 23, 1944, by ten 13th AF B-25s; April 17, 1944, by ten 13th AF fighter bombers, that pounded the runway; April 18, 1944, twelve 13th AF B-25 and nine fighter-bombers which failed to bomb Rapopo, instead bombing the airstrip at Keravat; April 20, 1944, by forty 13th AF fighter bombers; April 22, 1944, by 13th AF B-25s; and on May 10, 1944, by 13th AF fighters on a sweep, which hit trucks; and on May 16, 1944, by 13th AF fighter bombers which hit trucks and a saw mill was also damaged. The five airports that provided umbrella type defense to the Rabaul airport and the capital town, the stronghold of the Japanese forces during the war, were Kerevat, Lakuani, Vunakanau and Tobera; all of them were frequently bombed by allied forces. Two “Flying Nightmares” PBJ-1s bombed Kerevat and the other airports with 100-pound bombs so that Japanese fighters could not use them.
