= Toshiharu Sakigawa =

Japanese army officer

Toshiharu Sakigawa (崎川 俊春) was a Japanese lieutenant colonel. He is best known for leading a mechanized unit in January 1942, during World War II in which he attacked the Australians on the north coast of New Britain at Rabaul and Ataliklikun Bay during the Battle of Rabaul.
