= Urara Island =

Island in Papua New Guinea

Coordinates: 4°10′59″S 151°56′26″E

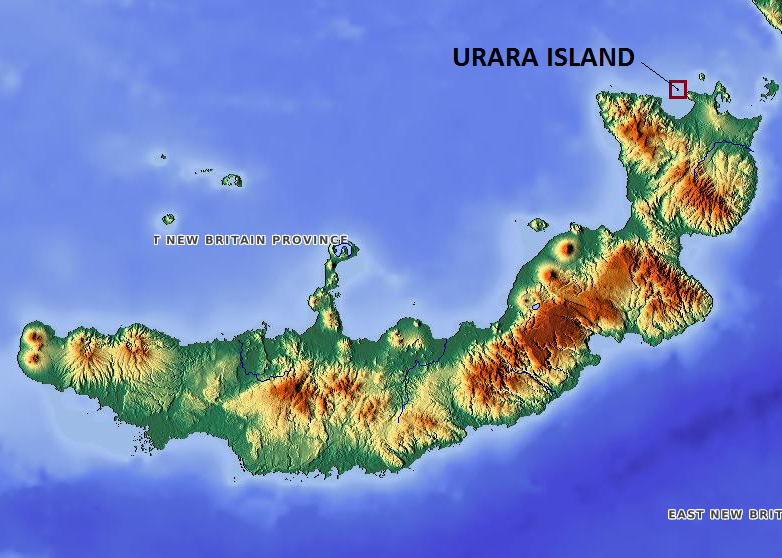

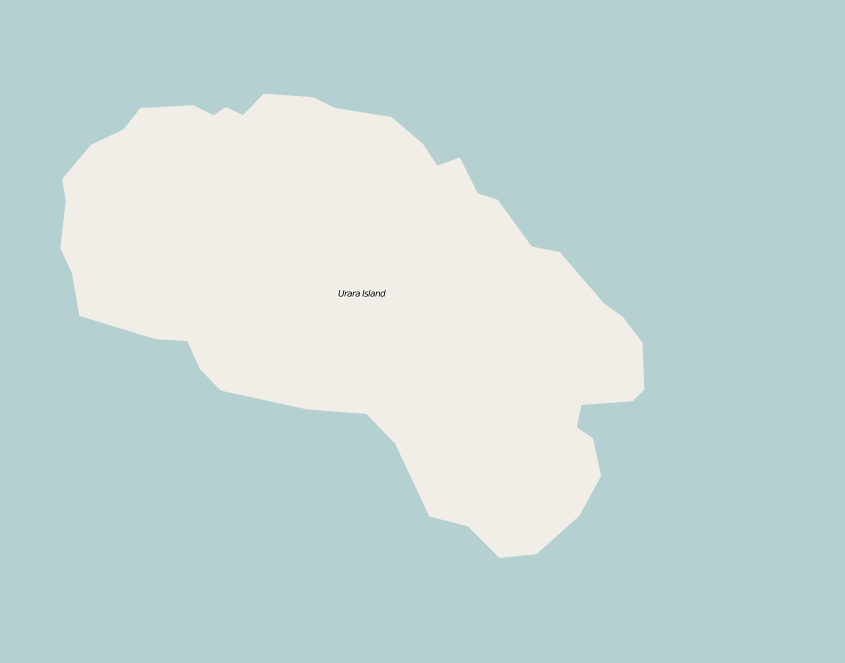

Urara Island is a small inhabited island in the northern part of Ataliklikun Bay (Bismarck Sea) in Papua New Guinea, located just off the mainland of the northern coast of New Britain. There are 3 villages, the largest lying on the southern central part of the coastline. Urara Island lies about 3 miles westward of Cape Liguan, and stands on a reef which extends a short distance only eastward of it and 1.5 miles to the westward. Materbert Island lies about 6 miles west of the island and Watom Island lies to the north-east.
