= Watom Island =

Island in Papua New Guinea

Coordinates: 4°6′54″S 152°4′19″E

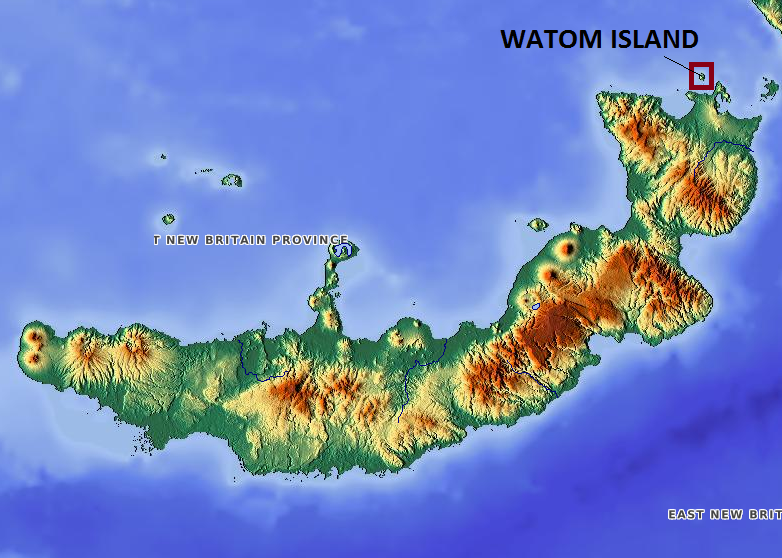
Location

Watom Island is an inhabited island in the Bismarck Sea in Papua New Guinea, located just off the mainland of the northern coast of New Britain, near Rabaul. It lies to the north-east of Urara Island. The island is almost entirely forested except for a few scattered settlements. The highest point of the island approaches 320 metres. Watom's Wall, a "classic wall dive well", located on the northern coast, is a notable diving location.

The island is administered under Watom Island Rural LLG in East New Britain Province.

During World War II, the island served as a prisoner of war camp for British soldiers captured at Singapore. Only 18 survived out of the original 600 shipped out on the Matsa Maru in November 1942. The last surviving 21 POWs were incarcerated on the island at the beginning of 1944, a further three dying by the end of the war leaving only 18 to return home.
