= Ataliklikun Bay =

Bay of East New Britain Province, Papua New Guinea

Coordinates: 4°15′40″S 151°55′02″E

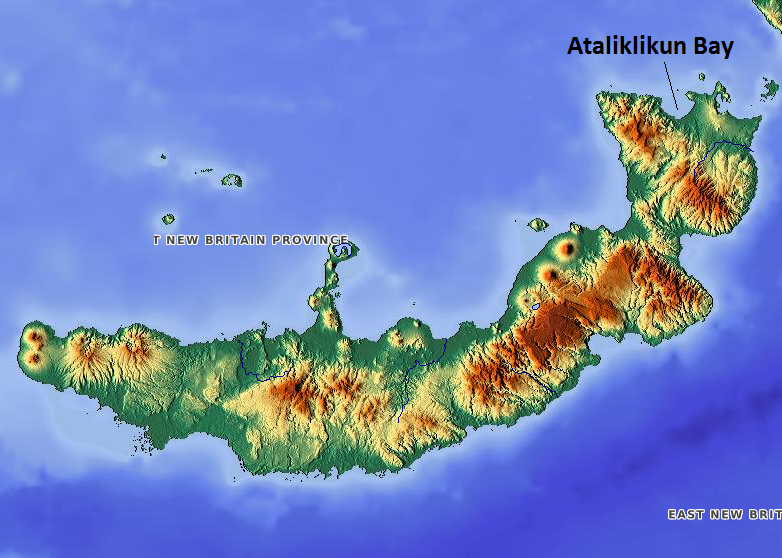
Location

Ataliklikun Bay (pronounced "At-lik-lik-kun") is a bay of East New Britain Province, Papua New Guinea, opening into the Bismarck Sea. It is located in the northern part of New Britain, south-west of Lassul Bay and to the west of Cape Lambert and Rabaul. Urara Island is located in the northern part of the bay. The Raulavat plantation lies in the eastern part of its 25-mile shoreline. The villagers along the shore reportedly speak the Minigir language and the Masava dialect of Tolai. The United States Hydrographic Office said "a reef awash, about 200 yards long east and west, with 15 and 19 fathoms around, on which the steamer Seestem struck in 1909, lies in the south-west part of Ataliklikun Bay."

== History ==
On January 27, 1942, during World War II, Lieutenant Colonel Toshiharu Sakigawa's mechanized unit advanced around Ataliklikun Bay during the Battle of Rabaul. A FG-1 Corsair 14417 Pilot Zanger crashed in the bay here on December 5, 1944, and was taken hostage.
