= Minigir language =

Minigir, which means "tongues", may be:

- Lungalunga language
- Bilur language
