= Battle of Rabaul =

Battle of Rabaul may refer to:

- Battle of Bita Paka, a 1914 battle fought south of Kabakaul, on the island of New Britain
- Siege of Toma, a bloodless action during World War I on the island of New Pomerania (now New Britain)
- Battle of Rabaul (1942)
- Bombing of Rabaul (1942)
- Bombing of Rabaul (November 1943)
- New Britain campaign (1943–45)
