= Bombing of Rabaul =

Bombing of Rabaul may refer to the following engagements of World War II

- Bombing of Rabaul (1942)
- Bombing of Rabaul (November 1943)
