= Rabaul Airfield Complex =

Airfield complex in Papua New Guinea

Rabaul Airfield Complex
- Gazelle Peninsula, New Britain in Papua New Guinea

Site information
- Type: Airfield complex
- Condition: Abandoned

Location
- Shown within Papua New Guinea
- Coordinates: 4°13′22″S 152°11′03″E

Site history
- Built: 1942
- In use: 1942–1945
- Fate: Disused

All landing grounds of Rabaul Airfield Complex

The Rabaul Airfield Complex consisted of multiple landing grounds used mainly by the Japanese. It was located on the Gazelle Peninsula of New Britain in Papua New Guinea.

== History ==
In 1941, the Allies had planned to convert Rabaul into a secure fleet anchorage, equipped with a radar station and a defensive minefield: however, these plans were shelved. The protection of Vunakanau Airfield was prioritised as it was the main Royal Australian Air Force (RAAF) station. It was used by No. 24 Squadron RAAF, which flew surveillance missions to record Japanese movements in the region. However, it was armed with 10 lightly armed CAC Wirraway training aircraft and 4 Lockheed Hudson light bombers, making them have little offensive capability.

The Japanese sought Rabaul because of its strategic proximity to the Caroline Islands, which was the site of an important Imperial Japanese Navy base on Truk. Following Guam's capture, the South Seas Force, under Major General Tomatiaro Hori, was tasked with capturing Kavieng and Rabaul, which was a part of Operation R. This operation involved the capture of region, mainly involving the airfields and the town of Rabaul. A multi-pronged landing focused on capturing the airfields and the centre of the town was chosen. Prior preparations were made, which involved the establishment of a brigade group based on the 55th Division. Its main combat components were from the 144th Infantry Regiment, which included a headquarters unit, three infantry battalions, an artillery company, signals unit, and a munitions squad. Additionally, platoons from the 55th Cavalry Regiment, a battalion from the 55th Mountain Artillery Regiment and finally a company from the 55th Engineer Regiment participated. These forces would be backed by a naval task force, and the landing would be preceded by a heavy aerial bombardment, aimed at destroying Allied air assets in the region, so that they were not able to interfere with the landing operations.

=== Invasion ===
In December 1941, the civilians who were unrelated to the defense of the base were evacuated. Shortly on 4 January, 1942, Rabaul was attacked by large numbers of Japanese carrier-base aircraft. 10 days later on 14 January, a Japanese force headed to Rabaul, consisting of two aircraft carriers Kaga and Akashi-seven cruisers, 14 destroys, and numerous smaller vessels and submarines commanded by Vice Admiral Shigeyoshi Inoue. On 20 January, over 100 Japanese aircraft attacked Rabaul in multiple waves. In response, 8 Wirraways of the 28 Squadron attacked, resulting in 3 RAAF planes shot down, two crash-landed, and another was damaged. Only one of the Japanese bombers was shot down by Allies anti-aircraft emplacements. As a result of the air attacks, the Australian coastal artillery was totaled, while the Australian infantry were withdrawn from Rabaul. On 23 January, Lakunai Airfield was captured by two battalions of the South Seas Force when Australian forces left several areas unguarded. The remaining RAAF elements had dwindled to two Wirraways and a single Hudson, and they had to withdraw to Lae. Despite the last effort plans that were made to split the remaining Australian soldiers and civilians into small companies in groups, it was ditched as the RAAF had instead organized evacuation plans.

In the six months that ensued after the invasion, approximately 1,200 Australian soldiers and civilians had died. Many had died in the jungles, 160 were massacred with bayonets at Tol plantation, and more than 1,000 military and civilian prisoners of war from Rabaul drowned when prison ship Montevideo Maru was sunk by an American submarine.

== Rabaul No. 1 ==
Location: 04°13′27″S 152°11′06″E

Rabaul No. 1, also known as Rabaul East, or Lakunai Airfield was originally built by the Australian administration before the war with a single runway measuring 4,709 feet long. It was surfaced with sand and volcanic ash for civil aircraft usage. In late November 1941, Lakunai Airfield were used by the Royal Australian Air Force as an advance base for the No. 24 Squadron's Hudsons. In November 1941, a Hudson numbered A16-13 crashed during take-off, causing multiple injuries.

=== Japanese occupation ===
On 23 January, 1942, the airfield was occupied by the Japanese during the invasion of Rabaul. Immediately afterwards, the 7th Construction Unit was deployed to work and expand the airfield. It was known by the Japanese as Rabinjikku (Rabaul Lower).

The first Japanese aircraft landed at Lakunai Airfield on 17 February, 1942, which were six A6M2 Zeros from Japanese aircraft carrier Shōhō. By the end of January, two groups of A5M4 Claude fighters arrived to fly Combat Air Patrols and missions. Following this, Lakunai Airfield was constantly bombed by Allied bombers. It was expanded with revetments on the north and south, and taxiways built using Japanese Testuban, which was a variant of the Marston Mat. Additionally, a large number of anti-aircraft guns were installed, and were supported by guns positioned around the perimeter of the airfield. Afterwards, Lakunai Airfield served as the primary fighter airstrip at Rabaul, and was mainly used by the Japanese Navy. Constant eruptions from Tavurvur often coated the area with a layer of ash. During early 1943, Japanese Army Air Force aircraft were stationed before withdrawal in August 1943. In February 1944, the remaining aircraft were withdrawn to Truk. Afterwards, anti-aircraft defenses remained operational until the end of the war. By the end of the war, hundreds of bombing missions were flown against the airfield, and it became littered with wrecked aircraft.

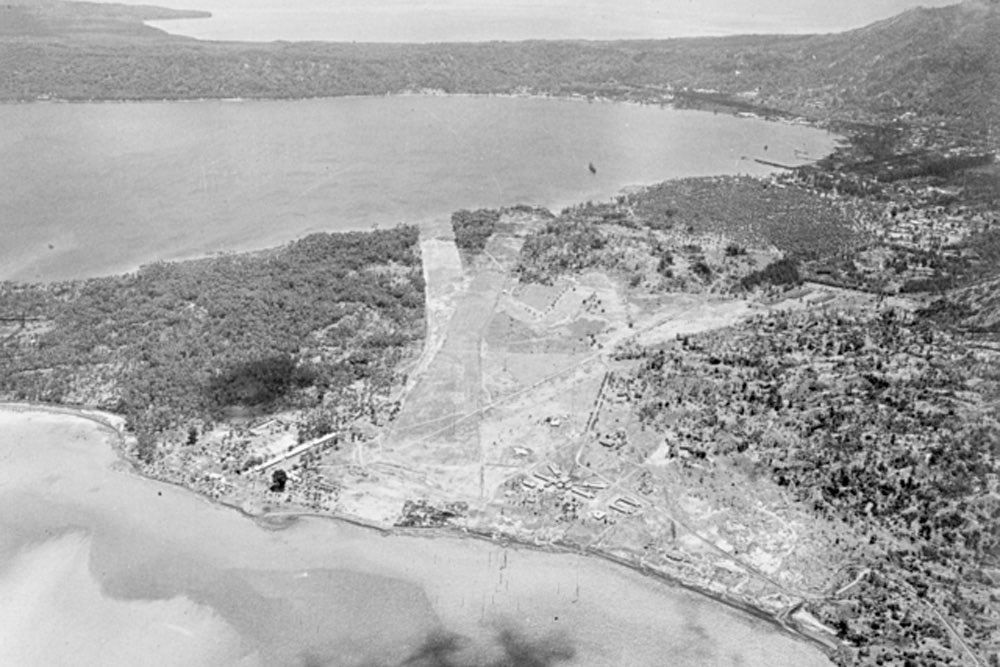
Oblique photo of Lakunai Airfield, circa 1944.

=== Allied capture ===
In September 1945, it was captured by Australian forces and repaired for Allied usage between September and October. On 1 November, 1945, a USMC PBJ Mitchell took off from Manus and landed at the airfield, which was the first Allied aircraft to land here since the start of the Pacific War. On 30 October, 1945, a RAAF Dakota arrived with mail for Australian servicemen. By late 1945, Lakunai Airfield fully returned to service and briefly based the No. 8 Squadron RAAF's Beaufort.

=== After World War II ===
From 1945 until 1994, Lakunai Airfield operated as a civilian airport for the region. In 1983, Tokua Airport was built with assistance and funding from Japan as an alternative for Lakunai Airfield for if it was unusable during a volcanic eruption. In 1994, a volcanic eruption (two sub-vents of Rabaul Volcano erupted almost simultaneously: Tavurvur and Vulcan) covered the airport and runway with a layer of ash, rendering it unserviceable. Following the eruption, Tokua Airport was opened for use, and Lakunai Airfield was abandoned.

Today, the runway is covered with a layer of ash. Beside the runway are the wreckage of Japanese aircraft, which included a Ki-21 Sally, Ki-48, and Ki-43 Oscar. A P-39 Airacobra and TDR-1 Attack Drone was also among the wreckage. In 1966, the wreckage of the TDR-1 was destroyed with a 2,000 lbs bomb, as locals feared evil spirits from an airplane without its cockpit. These wreckages remain as a popular tourist site.

=== Units based at Lakunai ===
==== Allied unit ====
- No. 8 Squadron RAAF, Bristol Beaufort (1945)

==== Japanese units ====
List of Japanese units:

- Chitose Kōkūtai (A5M Claude)
- 4th Kōkūtai (A5M Claude & A6M Zero) - February 10, 1942
- Tainan Kōkūtai (A6M Zero)
- 6th Kōkūtai (A6M Zero)
- 501st Kōkūtai (D4Y Judy)
- 11th Sentai (Ki-43 Oscar)
- 1st Sentai (Ki-43 Oscar)
- 68th Sentai (Ki-61 Tony)
- 78th Sentai (Ki-61 Tony)
- 81st Sentai (Ki-46 Dinah and Ki-21 Sally)

== Rabaul No. 2 ==
Location: 04°19′37″S 152°07′58″E

Rabaul No. 2, also known as Rabaul West, or Vunakanau Airfield was originally built by the Australian administration before the war with a single unpaved runway and a building. During December 1941, the airfield was used by the Royal Australian Air Force (RAAF) by No. 24 Squadron RAAF, equipped with 10 Wirraways, 4 Hudsons, and additional planes that operated from the nearby Lakunai Airfield. This was done in preparation for the defense of Rabaul. On 6 January, 1942, Japanese flying boats bombed Vunakanau Airfield for the first time. On 20 January, 1942, 8 Wirraways of the No. 24 Squadron struggled to intercept over a hundred Japanese aircraft raiding Rabaul. However, escorting A6M2 Zeros shot all of their planes down, rendering them damaged and written off afterwards.

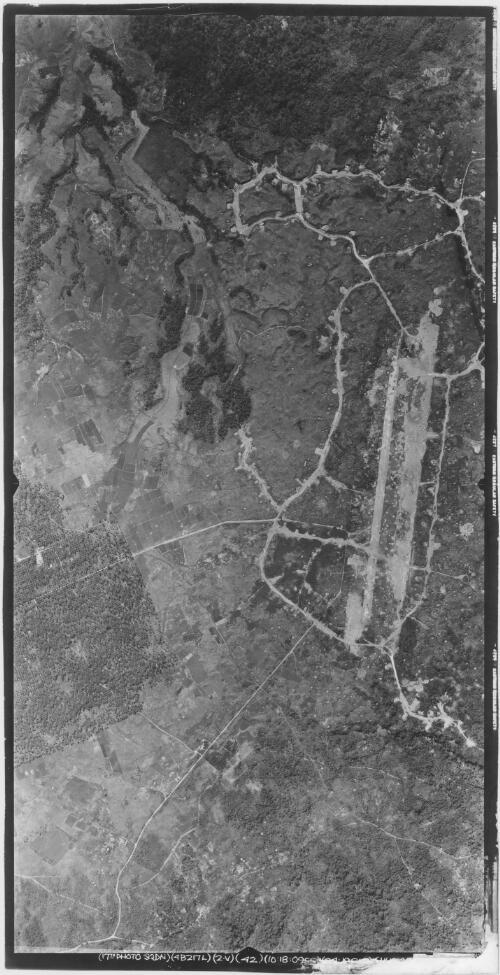
Vunakanau Airfield in 1942.

On 21 January, 1942, commanding officer of the No. 24 Squadron John M. Lerew, sent the radio message "We who are about to die salute you" to the RAAF headquarters located in Melbourne. Finally, on 22 January, 1942, the last Hudson loaded with wounded personnel took off from the airfield, bound for Port Moresby. Remaining Australian personnel trekked southward towards the southern coast of New Britain. Following this, the squadron withdrew and Vunakanau Airfield was left abandoned with multiple damaged Wirraways.

=== Japanese occupation ===
During late January, 1942, Vunakanau Airfield was occupied by the Japanese after they captured the Rabaul area. The Imperial Japanese Navy subsequently began to repair and expand the runway for bomber and fighter usage. Subsequently, Allied aircraft began bombing the airfield, mainly targeting the runway and parked aircraft. However, the Japanese were able to keep it serviceable until the end of the war. The airfield was expanded and improved. By 10 November, 1943, Vunakanau Airfield had two parallel runways both measuring 5,100 feet long with taxiways. There were also 64 bomber and 81 fighter revetments, and defenses included 15 heavy-anti aircraft guns, 14 medium anti-aircraft guns, 12 light machine guns, and 3 searchlight batteries. These additions were noted by Allied intelligence.

On 20 February, 1944, the last Japanese aircraft were ordered to withdraw from Vunakanau Airfield and head northward to Truk. These aircraft were assigned to the 105th Naval Base Air Unit, and became a part of the “Rabaul Air Force” which continued to fly reconnaissance and occasional strike missions. By 25 February, 1944, the withdrawal was completely, which marked the end of the air war over the Rabaul area. Afterwards, anti-aircraft defenses remained active and continued to fire at Allied aircraft.

=== Japanese surrender ===
Following the surrender of Japan, in early September 1945, the remaining aircraft were painted in white with green crosses to signify surrender. The pilots requested permission to surrender the aircraft to the Air Force, and on 18 September, 1945, the four aircraft were flown to Jacquinot Bay Airfield. During the flight, they were escorted by Royal New Zealand Air Force Corsairs. After landing, they saluted, made a report, and were flown back to Rabaul where they became Japanese prisoners of war.

=== After World War II ===
After the war ended, Vunakanau Airfield was repaired and continued to be operational. In the 1970s, behind the Catholic Mission at Malmaluan an underground radio back bunker with radio racks was rediscovered. By 1983, only one of the runways remained in use, until the activation of Tokua Airfield in 1994, and the airfield was fully abandoned. During the 1980s, much of the remaining wreckage was transported to the Kokopo Museum display. Today, the former runways are overgrown but still visible from above. Walking trails and roads trace the old runway and taxiways.

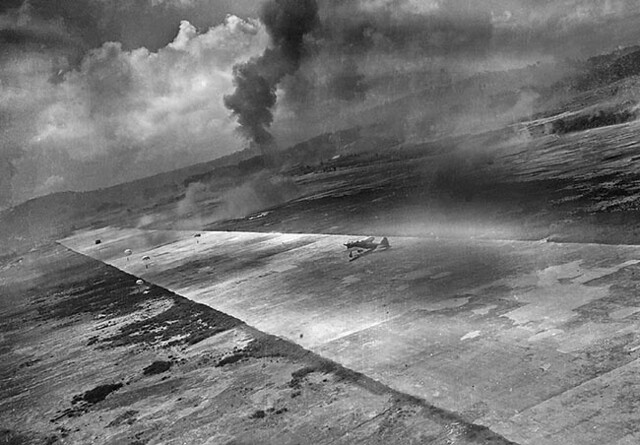
Oblique photo of Vunakanau Airfield.

=== Units based at Vunakanau ===
List of Imperial Japanese Navy units:

- 4th Kōkūtai, February 14–18, 1942 - unknown, equipped with G4M1s
- Misawa Kōkūtai, August 7, 1942 - Oct 1942, equipped with 9 G4M1s
- 705 Kōkūtai, January 1943 - April 1943, equipped with G4M1s
- 702 Kōkūtai, May 1943 - 11 December, 1943 equipped with G4M1 Bettys
- 751 Kōkūtai, 11 October, 1942 - May 1943
- Tainan Kōkūtai, April 1942 - November 1942, equipped with A6M Zeros
- 251 Kōkūtai, November 1942 - mid-1943, equipped with A6M Zero and J1NA Irving

List of Japanese Army Air Force units:

- 1st Hiko Sentai, January - August 1943, equipped with Ki-43 Oscar
- 11th Hiko Sentai, December 18, 1943 - June 1943, equipped with Ki-43 Oscar
- 13th Hiko Sentai, May 1943 - September 1943, equipped with Ki-45 Nick
- 68th Hiko Sentai, April 1943–July 1943, equipped with Ki-61 Tony
- 78th Hiko Sentai, June 1943–July 1943, equipped with Ki-61 Tony

== Rabaul No. 3 ==
Location: 04°20′24″S 152°19′06″E

Rabaul No. 3, also known as Rabaul South or Rapopo Airfield, was located at Rapopo, inland from Lesson Point on the Gazala Peninsula. Before the war, the Rapopo Plantation and Ulaveo Plantation were established here and planted with coconut palms for copra harvesting.

=== Japanese occupation ===
In late January 1942, Rapopo was occupied by the Japanese. By December 1942, the Japanese began the construction of a single runway on both plantations. Construction methods were primitive, as they relied on tanks to push down coconut palm trees into trenches that were hand-dug. By early January 1943, the runway was completed, and taxiways and revetments were built on the east and west sides of the runway. Additionally, a flyway was built at the northern end to the tip of Lesson Point. Rapopo Airfield was defended by approximately 29 heavy anti-aircraft, 21 medium anti-aircraft, and 13 light anti-aircraft guns, all supported by 5 search lights. The runway constantly faced draining issues, and was often muddy. By early 1943, the airfield was discovered by Allied reconnaissance and subsequently faced constant attacks by American bombers and fighters until mid-1944. On 1 October, 1943, the runway was expanded to 4,350 feet long, with at least 90 bomber revetments on the east and west sides of the runways.

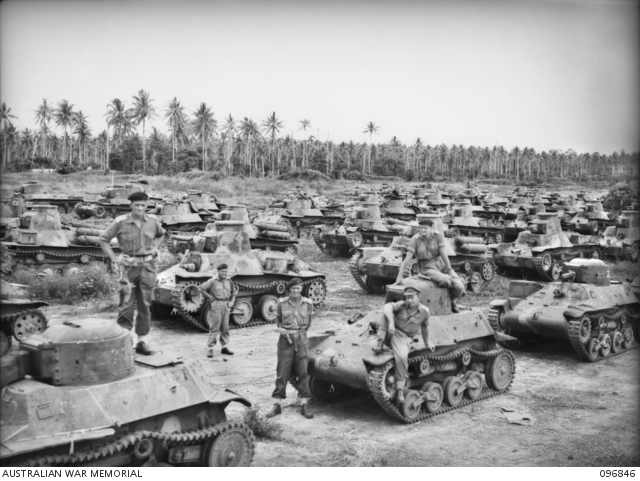
Rapopo Airstrip, New Britain, 1945-09-19. Japanese medium and light tanks and armoured cars lined up on the airstrip. Members of 2/4 Armoured Regiment are pictured amongst the tanks.

=== Japanese surrender ===
On 8 September, 1945, the Japanese forces on New Britain surrendered. Afterwards, all of the remaining tanks and vehicles were assembled in lines at Rapopo Airfield. On 19 September, 1945, the Australian Army 2/4 Armoured Regiment's A Squadron personnel inspected the 40 tanks and vehicles, which included Type 95 Ha Go light tanks, amphibious tanks, and other vehicles. On 28 September, 1945, the surrendered tanks were driven from Rapopo to Rabaul by the Japanese drivers with Australian commanders. Afterwards, many were destroyed or left abandoned, while two of the tanks were shipped to Australia as a war prize.

=== After World War II ===
Today, the surrendered tanks are displayed at the Royal Australian Armoured Corps Museum. At the end of the Pacific War, the airfield was disused. During the mid-1980s, the airfield was replanted with coconut palms for harvesting copra. Many of the remaining wartime relics were either removed or scrapped, and a 37mm cannon from a Ki-45 were recovered for display at the Kokopo War Museum.

Today, Rapopo Airfield has fully been replanted as a coconut plantation, but revetments and tunnel entrances still remain visible. Many of the remaining wartime elics were buried or destroyed. It is currently owned by the Rapopo Plantation Resort located west of the former runway.

=== Units based at Rapopo ===
List of Japanese units:

- Detachment of 45th Hiko Sentai, January 1943 - January 23, 1943, equipped with Ki-48 Lily
- 14th Sentai, 2 March, 1943 - 1943, equipped with 36 Ki-21 Sally
- 20th Dokuritsu Dai Shijugo Chutai, May 1943, equipped with Ki-21 and Ki-49

== Rabaul No. 4 ==
Location: 04°23′49″S 152°15′34″E

Rabaul No. 4, also known as Tobera Airfield, was located on the prewar Tobera Plantation, which had rows of coconut palms for harvesting copra.

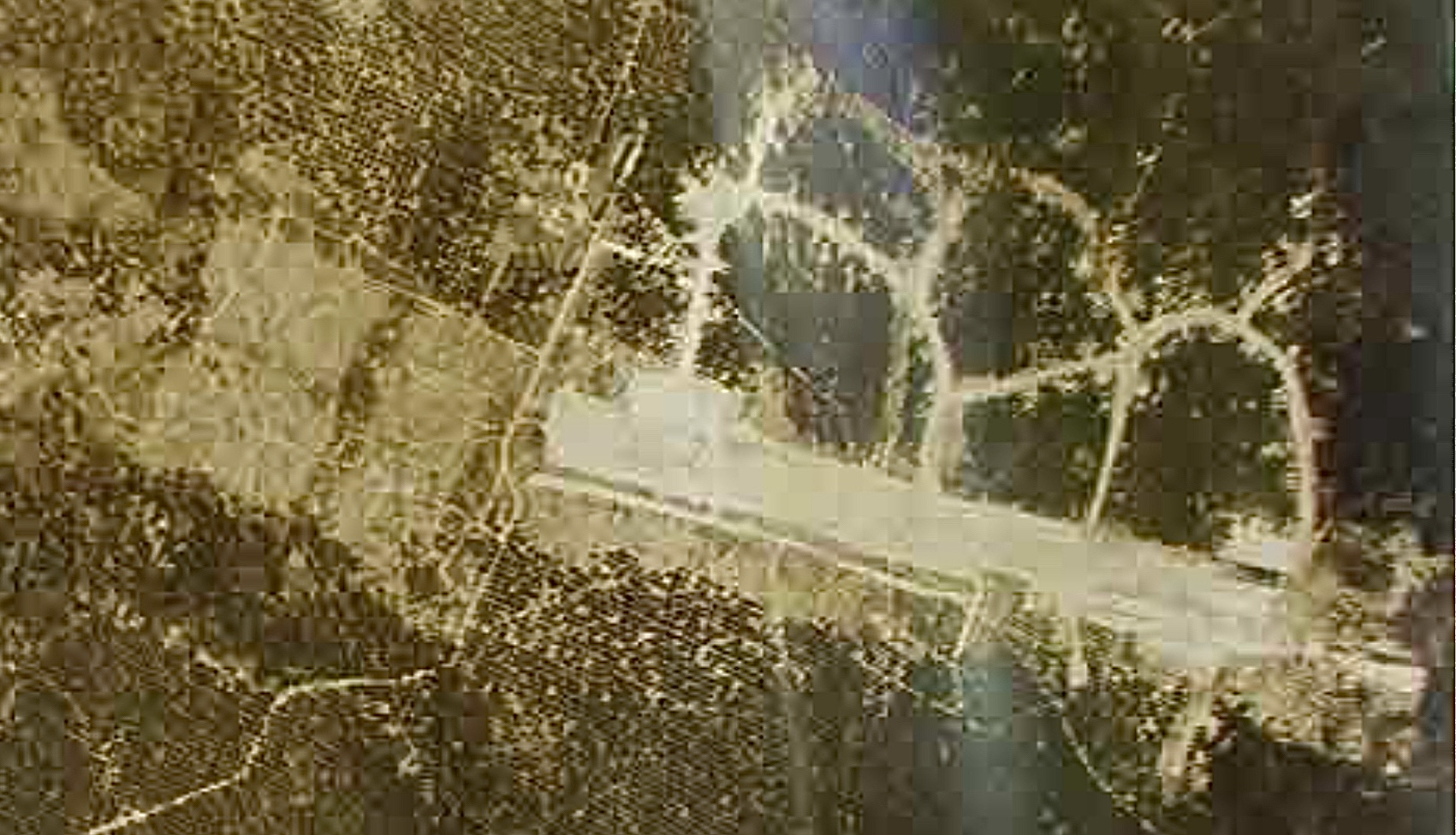
Aerial photograph of Tobera Airfield, 1945.

In July 1943, the Japanese began construction of a single concrete runway measuring 3,600 feet long and a concrete apron. In August 1943, the concrete runway was completed with a control tower on the north side of the runway. It was the shortest runway out of all of the landing grounds in the airfield complex, as it was primarily used for fighters. Several taxiway loops were built with revetments positioned on the southern side of the runway for parking fighters. Additionally, a second intersecting runway oriented northwest to southeast was under constructing by late 1943. However, by early 1944, it was never completed. Tobera Airfield was mainly used by Imperial Japanese Navy (IJN) A6M Zeros, and was assigned the three letter code OFI. There were nearby camps for Japanese personnel, and anti-aircraft gun emplacements for the airfield's defense.

On October 24, 1943, the first Allied mission against Tobera Airfield was held, involving B-25s from the 3rd BG, 13th BS. During this period, Zeros from the 253 Kokutai that was based in the airfield intercepted nearly every attack. To repair the runway, a Kato Narrow Gauge Rail Locomotive was used to pull carts full of dirt to patch the runway. It ran on a 610mm narrow gauge railway line, which ran along the airfield. It was installed in October 1943. The locomotive would constantly be strafed by Allied fighters. By late January 1944, the Japanese had sustained heavy losses. In March 1945, the 105th Naval Base Air Unit, comprising 2,000 personnel, kept the airfield serviceable. Additionally, two construction units were attached, which included the 28th Construction Unit, comprising 200 civilians and convict laborers. Owing to massive shortages, anti-aircraft shells and fuel stocks were ever low and had to be carefully dispersed. Most Japanese personnel had to plant and maintain gardens to grow food for subsistence as last resort. Remaining personnel were stationed 3 miles north of the airfield in air raid tunnels, which could accommodate 50 men each.

=== After World War II ===
After the war, Tobera Airfield was abandoned. It was so heavily bombed, that the land was covered in bomb craters, revetments, trenches and tunnels. However, over the years, vegetation grew over the land and taxiways. In the early 1950s, half of the airfield was purchased by Douglas Joycey, who renamed the plantation to Vimy Plantation and began replanting it with coconut palms to harvest copra. In the 1980s, a crane was used to recover Type 10 120mm anti-aircraft gun and search light from the Vimy Plantation, and was sent to be displayed at Kokopo Museum. In the early 1990s, company Golden Dolphin 3 purchased a portion of Vimy Plantation and renamed it to Vunatung Plantation.

Today, Tobera Airfield remains abandoned, and a house has been built on the middle of the runway upon a hardstand. Near the house is a collection of Japanese wreckage, which was moved from Vunakanau for safekeeping and display during the 1980s. This includes a Ki-43-II Oscar, A6M3 Zero, and a G4M1 Betty.

=== Units based at Tobera ===
List of units:

- 201 Kokutai, equipped with A6M Zero
- 252 Kokutai, late 1943 - February 17, 1944, equipped with A6M Zero
- 253 Kokutai, September 1943 - February 17, 1944, equipped with A6M Zero
- Zuikaku Detachment, January 1944, equipped with A6M Zero replacements from the 2nd Carrier Division
- 105th Naval Base Air Unit, June 1944 – August 1945, equipped with A6M Zero
- 28th Construction Unit, mainly civilians and convict labor

== See also ==
- Dobodura Airfield Complex
- Port Moresby Airfield Complex

== Bibliography ==
- Sakaida, Henry (1996). The Siege of Rabaul. St. Paul, MN, USA: Phalanx. ISBN 1-883809-09-6.
- Gamble, Bruce (2006). Darkest Hour: The True Story of Lark Force at Rabaul. St. Paul, Minnesota: Zenith Imprint. ISBN 0-7603-2349-6.
