= Vulcan (volcano) =

Volcano in East New Britain, Papua New Guinea

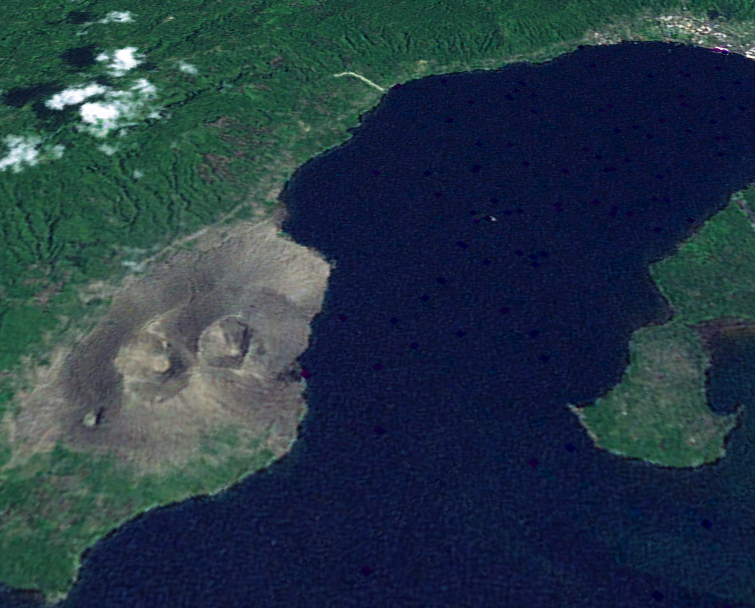
- Vulcan, as seen from space.

Highest point
- Elevation: 243 m (797 ft)
- Coordinates: 4°16′16″S 152°10′12″E

Geography
- Location: East New Britain, Papua New Guinea

Geology
- Mountain type(s): Pumice cone, vent of Rabaul caldera
- Last eruption: 1994 to 1995

Vulcan is a pumice cone in Papua New Guinea. It is a sub-vent of the Rabaul caldera and lies on its western rim. Its most recent eruption was in 1994, when it and another vent, Tavurvur, forced the city of Rabaul to be temporarily abandoned and the local administrative centres of East New Britain Province to be moved to a new capital, Kokopo. Today, the slopes of Vulcan are now forested, as a result of dormancy since 1994.

Vulcan did not exist during the German colonial times, although the agronomist for the New Guinea Company, Richard Parkinson, noticed that a small island in the harbour in 1880 had grown noticeably larger by 1900. During the 1920s the island offered enough new land for Australian colonials to open a sporting club there, with tennis courts. By 1937 Vulcan was its current size and erupted that year, filling the harbour with a thick layer of pumice. An Australian Navy sailor walked out from the wharf some hundred meters before he broke through the crust and drowned.
