= Rabaul caldera =

Volcano in Papua New Guinea

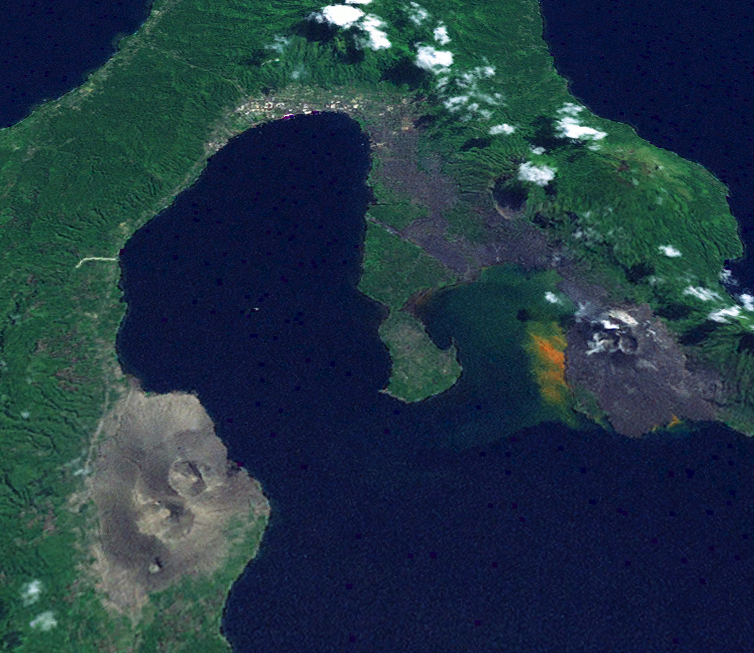
- True-colour image of the Rabaul caldera from space. From left to right: Vulcan (twin cones), Rabalanakaia, Tavurvur.

Highest point
- Elevation: 688 m (2,257 ft)
- Listing: List of volcanoes in Papua New Guinea
- Coordinates: 4°16′16″S 152°12′11″E

Geography
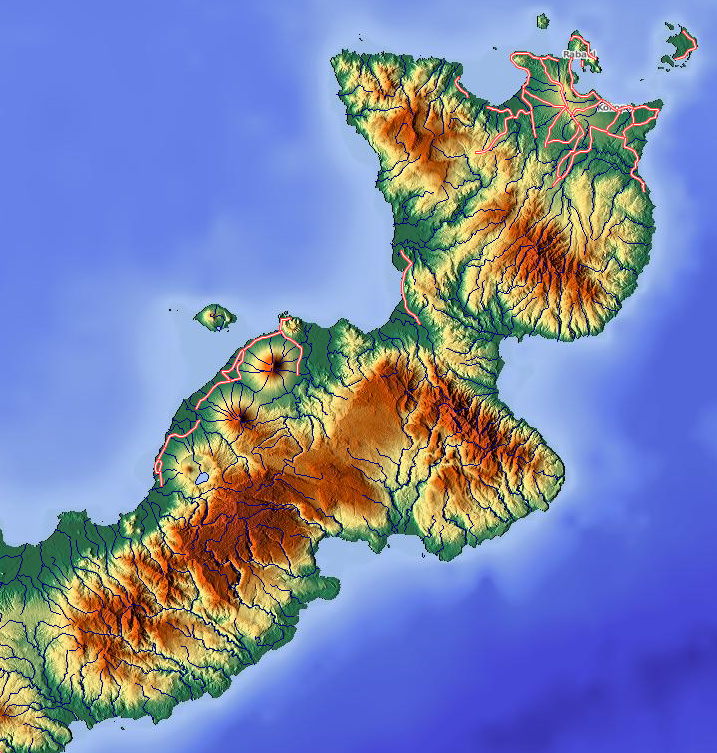
- Location within East New Britain
- Location: Gazelle Peninsula, East New Britain, Papua New Guinea

Geology
- Formed by: Subduction zone volcanism
- Rock age: ~1,400 years
- Mountain type: Pyroclastic shield/Caldera
- Volcanic arc: Bismarck volcanic arc
- Last eruption: August to September 2014

The Rabaul caldera, or Rabaul Volcano, is a large volcano on the tip of the Gazelle Peninsula in East New Britain, Papua New Guinea, and derives its name from the town of Rabaul inside the caldera. The caldera has many sub-vents, Tavurvur being the most well known for its devastating eruptions over Rabaul. The outer flanks of the highest peak, a 688-metre-high asymmetrical pyroclastic shield, are formed by thick pyroclastic flow deposits. There is no sign of a pyroclastic shield along the rim of the caldera, making the location likely underwater, on the caldera's floor.

Tavurvur, a stratovolcano and a sub-vent of the caldera, is the most visibly active, continuously throwing ash. In 1994 it, and nearby Vulcan, erupted and devastated Rabaul; however, due to planning for such a catastrophe, the townsfolk were prepared and only five people were killed. One of the deaths was caused by lightning, a feature of volcanic ash clouds.

In 1937, Vulcan and Tavurvur erupted simultaneously, killing 507 people. This event led to the founding of the Rabaul Volcano Observatory, which watches over the many active volcanoes in Papua New Guinea. One eruption over several days in March 2008 released a plume of ash and water vapor that drifted northwest over the Bismarck Sea.

== Subsidiary features ==
- Stratovolcano
  - Tavurvur – 223 meters (732 feet) 4.239°S 152.21°E
  - Rabalanakaia – 88 meters (289 feet) 4.217°S 152.197°E
- Pumice cones
  - Vulcan – 243 meters (797 feet) 4.271°S 152.17°E

== Eruptions ==
- 535 AD: There is evidence of a large eruption at Rabaul, that may be the event recorded in chronicles of the reign of Byzantine Emperor Justinian I as ruining the climate and helping to bring on the Middle Ages. But it is not certain, as there are other possible culprits, including Ilopango in El Salvador in Central America.
- 683 ± 2: There was a VEI force 6 eruption at Rabaul, dated by corrected radiocarbon; there is an opinion that that eruption formed the Rabaul Caldera sea-inlet.
- 1808: It could be the source of the 1808 mystery eruption.
- 1878: Vulcan cone nearby was formed during a large eruption in 1878.
- 1937: Tavurvur and Vulcan erupted, killing 508 people. For more information, see Rabaul#Rabaul (Tavurvur) volcano: 6 June 1937 eruption.
- 19 September 1994: Tavurvur and Vulcan erupted, destroying Rabaul airport and covering most of Rabaul town with heavy ashfall. Vulcan has remained quiet since. For more information see Rabaul#1994 eruption.
- 1994 to 1995: Last eruptions of Vulcan.
- 7 October 2006: Tavurvur erupted again, and an initial blast broke windows up to 12 kilometers away and sent an ash plume 18 km into the stratosphere. Winds blew most of the ash away from Rabaul.
- 2009: An eruption of Tavurvur was filmed by a BBC crew for the three-part nature documentary series Lost Land of the Volcano produced by the BBC Natural History Unit. The programme also looked at the wildlife living around the volcano and in its ash field, including brahminy kites, rhinoceros beetles, megapode birds and land crabs.
- 1 January to 8 April 2010 (BGVN 35:02): Tavurvur was quiet.

=== July 2010 eruptions ===
- 23 July 2010: Eruptions at Tavurvur volcano resumed after nearly seven months without ash emissions.
- 2–8 April 2010: Seismicity was low and variable amounts of white vapor rose from Tavurvur cone.
- 9 April 2010: The Rabaul Volcano Observatory (RVO) reported that deformation measurements at Rabaul caldera during the previous 3–4 months had shown an inflationary trend with a total of 4 cm of uplift.
- 22 July 2010: RVO detected increased seismicity (likely beneath Tavurvur cone), as a few small hybrid earthquakes, followed by small low-frequency earthquakes, then continuous volcanic tremor starting at time 1034.
- 23 July 2010: Tavurvur cone erupted, starting at time 1300. The eruption began with discharge of diffuse white plumes, followed by pink-gray fumes with low ash content. A strong odor of hydrogen sulfide was noted, and a diffuse cloud rose 1 km and drifted NW. A few hours later, observers saw billowing gray clouds, accompanied by roaring and rumbling noises. Ashfall was reported in areas to the cone's NW and NNW.
- 23–26 July 2010: RVO reported that seismicity was variable. Ash emissions and ashfall continued in areas to the northwest. Visibility remained poor in Rabaul town (3–5 km NW of Tavurvur) due to ash made airborne by moving vehicles. Ash emissions ceased on 25 July. Later that day and into 26 July only diffuse brown-tinted vapor plumes were emitted and seismicity was very low.

After this eruption, GPS data showed deflation of Tavurvur cone. Seismicity was very low, and diffuse white plumes were emitted during 26–30 July.

=== 2013–14 eruptions ===
- January 2013: Tavurvur began to smolder.
- March 2014: Tavurvur became quiet.
- August 2014: Tavurvur woke and smoldered.
- 29 August 2014: Tavurvur started a VEI 3 eruption, around 3:30–4:00 AM local time (28 August 2014, 17:30–18:00 UTC) prompting concerns over disruption of flights in Australian airspace due to the large ash clouds (up to 15 km (50,000 ft). Communities near the volcano were evacuated, while residents of the town of Rabaul were advised to remain indoors to avoid falling ash, according to a statement from Australia's Department of Foreign Affairs and Trade. The VEI of this eruption was 3–4.

== Images ==
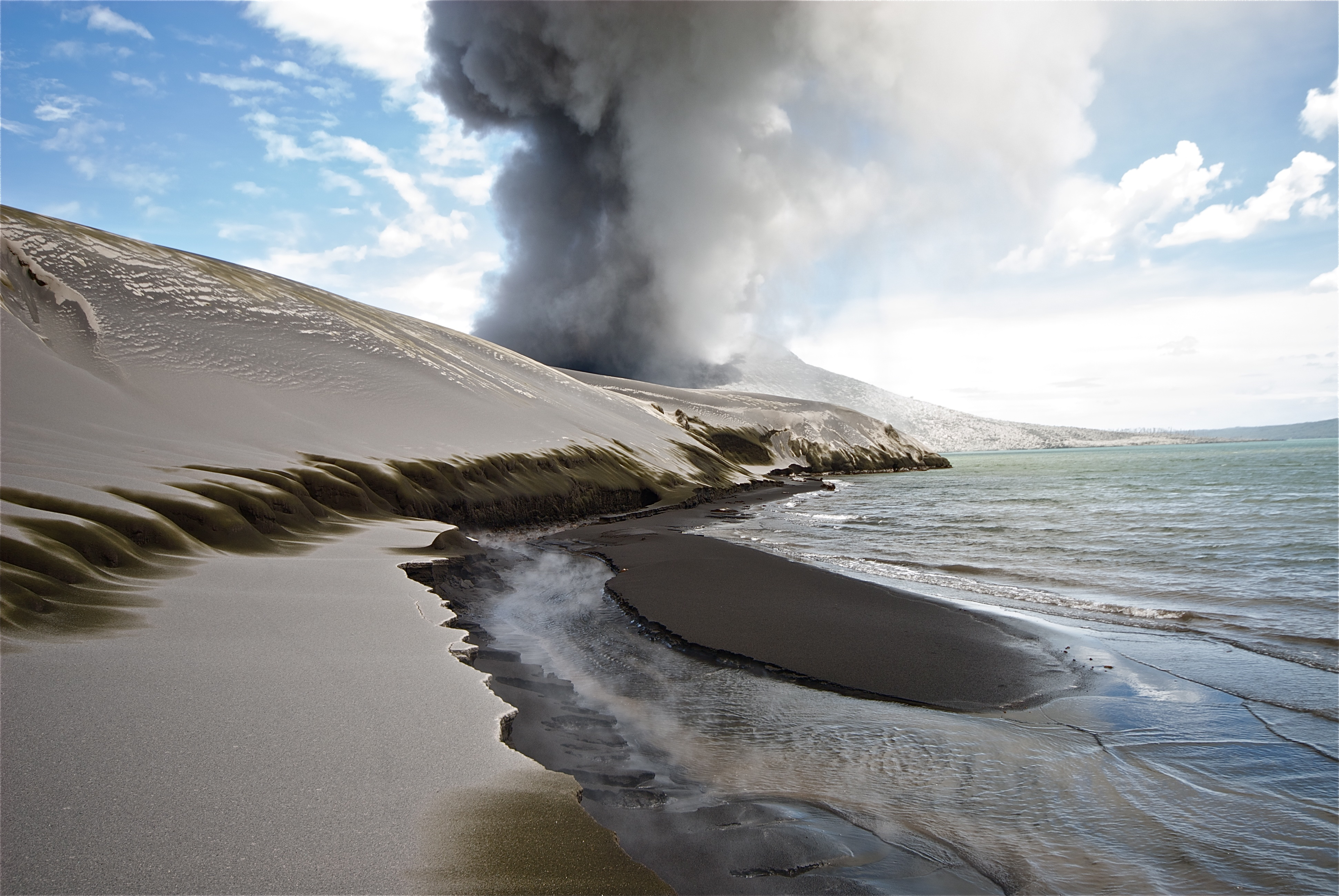
Dunes of volcanic ash near Tavurvur

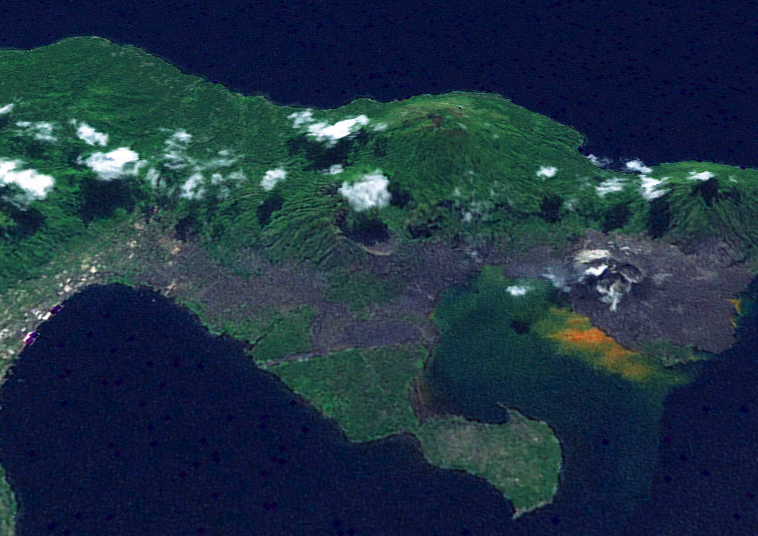
Tavurvur (right) and Rabalanakaia (left), as seen from space

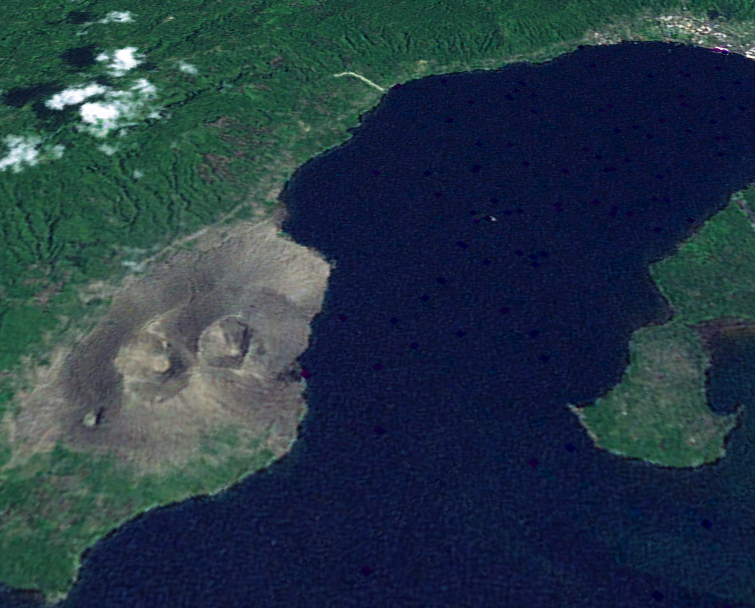
Vulcan, as seen from space

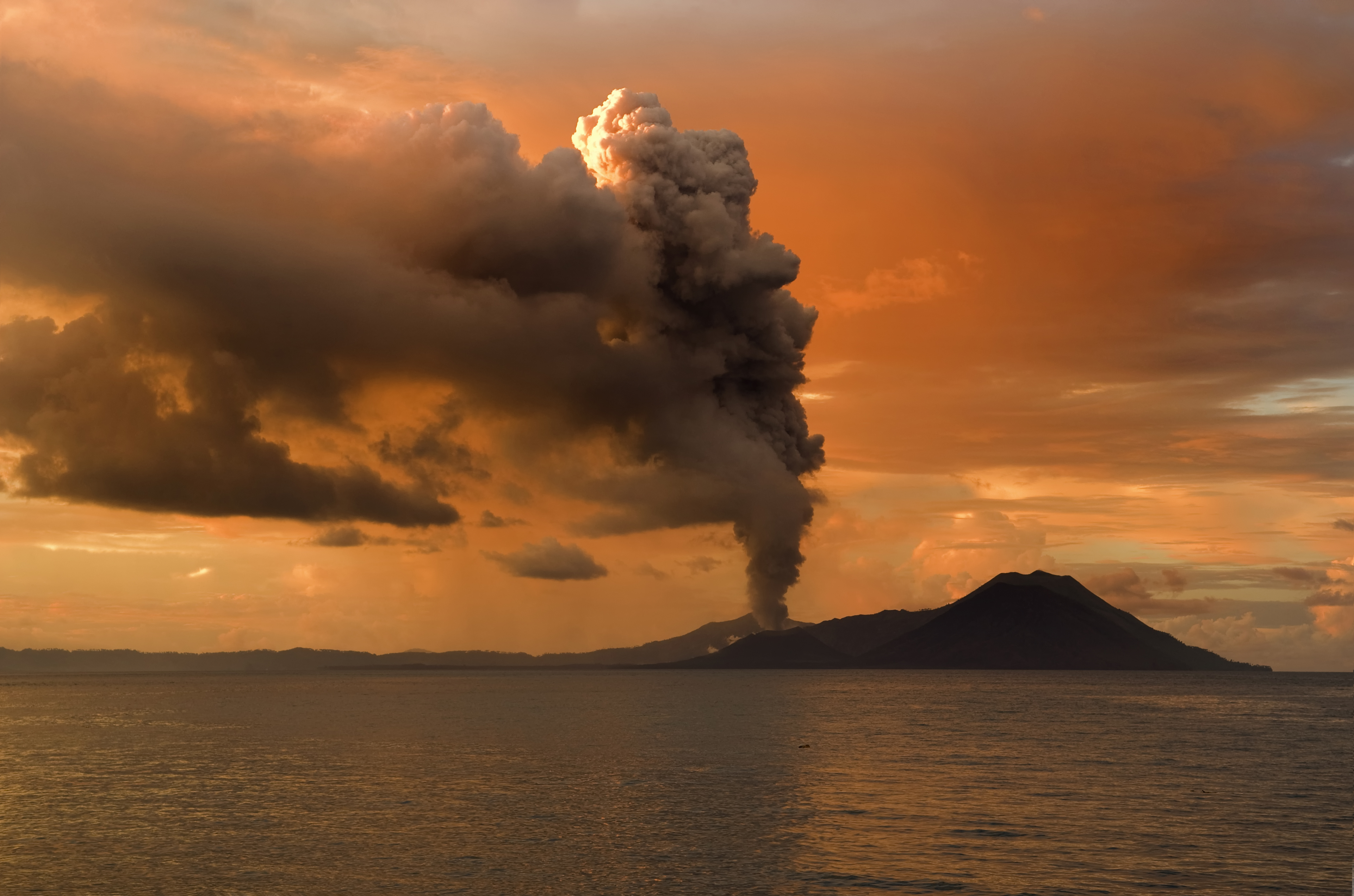
Ash cloud from Tavurvur's 2009 eruption, as seen from the Solomon Sea

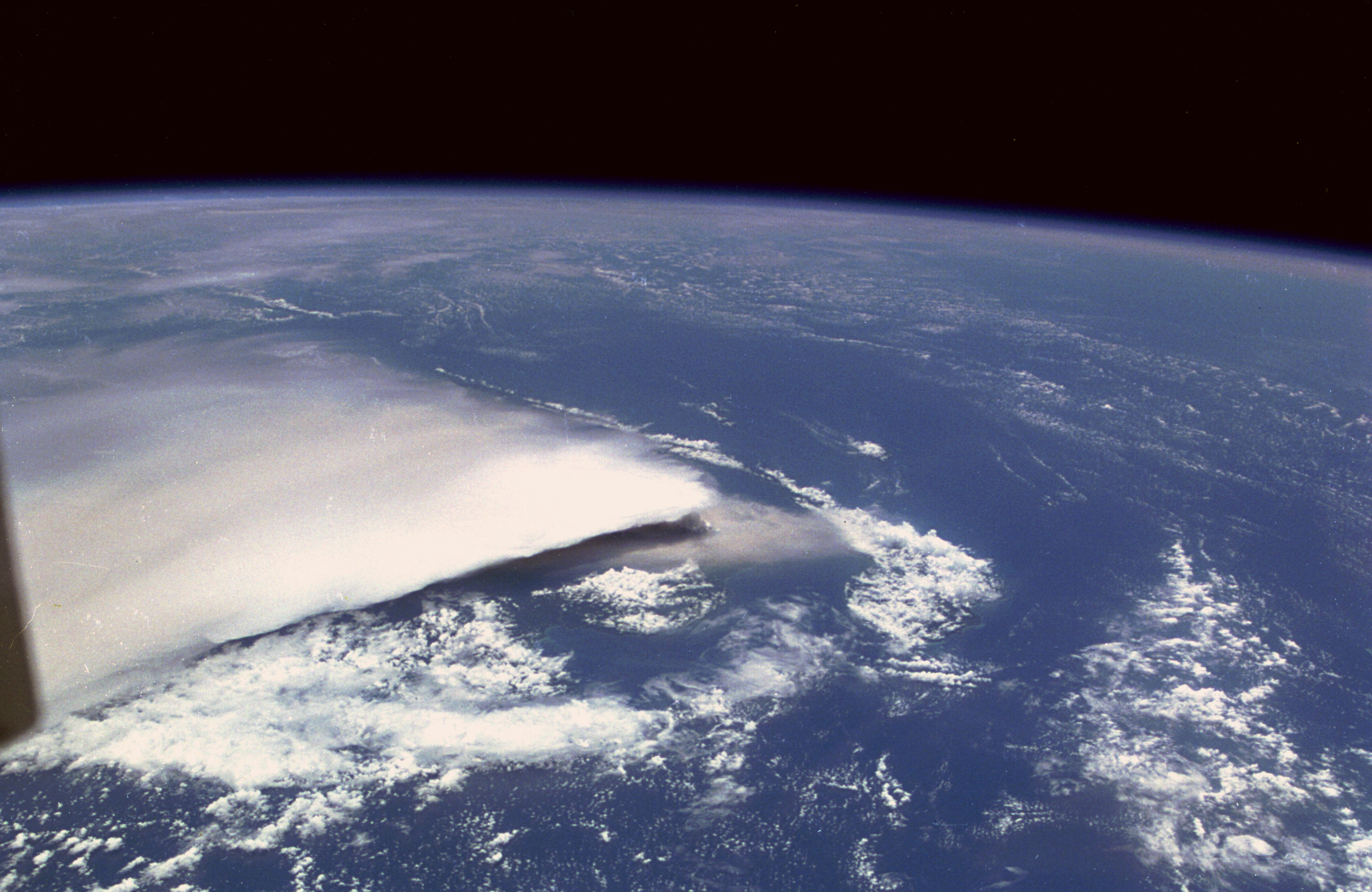
Ash cloud from the September 1994 eruption, as viewed from the Space Shuttle

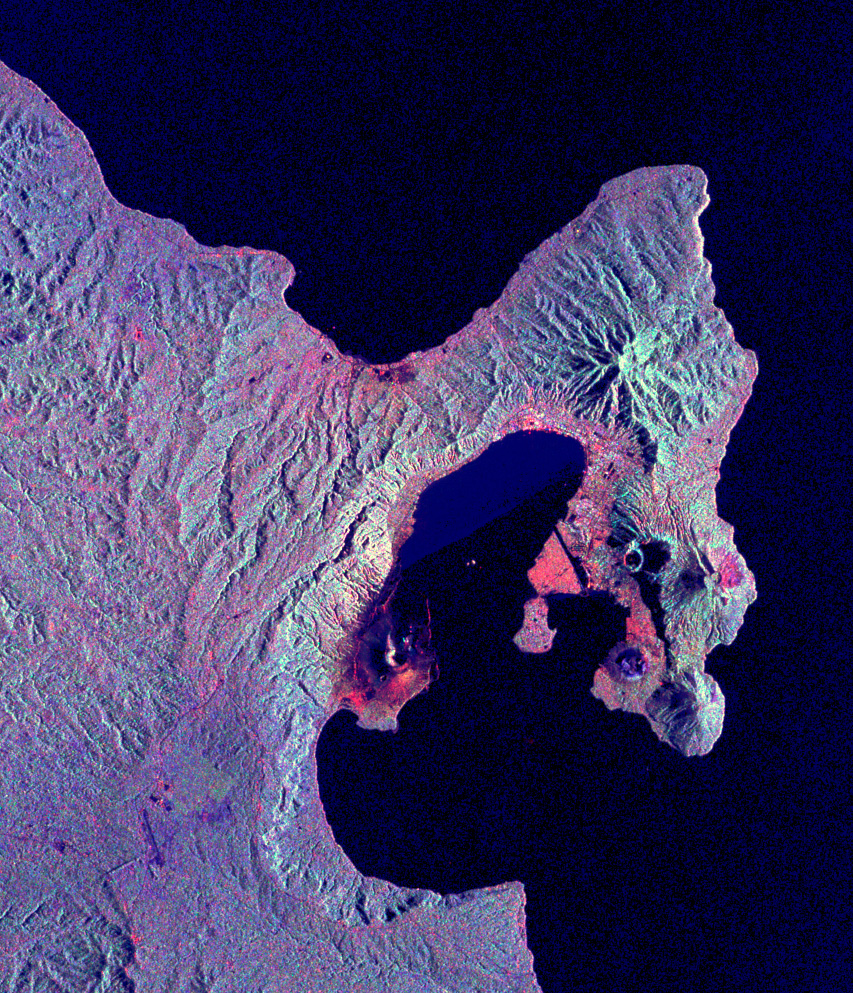
A space radar image of the Rabaul Volcano
