= Tolai =

Tolai may refer to

- The Tolai language, an Austronesian language of Papua New Guinea
- The Tolai people, the speakers of this language
