= Bombing of Rabaul (1942) =

The Bombing of Rabaul in February and March 1942 occurred when Allied forces launched counter-attacks against the Empire of Japan base at Rabaul, Papua New Guinea. Rabaul had been captured by the Japanese during the Battle of Rabaul in late January.

The bombing started on 20 February 1942 by the United States Navy task force with the flagship Lexington, commanded by Vice Admiral Wilson Brown. Later, the same officer commanded a new task force supported by the carrier Yorktown on 10 March 1942 with the same purpose, amongst other objectives, in East New Guinea.

The American bombings were supported by Royal Australian Air Force air strikes against the Japanese aerodromes in Rabaul during March.

== History ==
The Japanese captured Rabaul in the Battle of Rabaul in January 1942. They were preparing to convert the town into a large naval and air base for supplies and forces needed for the expansion of the Empire of Japan perimeter in the South West Pacific. This included the planned conquest of Port Moresby and subsequent occupation of New Caledonia, New Hebrides (Vanuatu), Fiji, Samoa and other nearby islands.

=== First American strike ===
On 20 February 1942, Vice Admiral Brown—under the lead of Admiral Leary en route to the objective—navigated the Southwest Pacific with plans to strike the recently conquered Japanese base in Rabaul, located in New Britain. Japanese reconnaissance planes saw this force and the Japanese ordered twin-engined land-based torpedo bombers to attack, but they were intercepted by Lexington's Grumman F4F-4 Wildcat fighters and anti-aircraft fire from the carrier and its escort vessels, which shot down 16 Japanese planes.

Due to the loss of the surprise factor, the American admiral ordered the task force to retire from the area.

On 23 February, six Boeing B-17 Flying Fortress heavy bombers of the US Army Fifth Air Force, diverted from Hawaii and first operating out of Fiji, flew out of Townsville under Royal Australian Air Force command on the first American land based bomber raid on Rabaul.

=== Second American strike ===
Later, Vice Admiral Brown—leading a new task force composed of the carriers Lexington and Yorktown, along with escort and support vessels—received new orders to strike the Japanese in Rabaul and nearby areas. Admiral Brown decided to arrive at Papuasia Gulf in South New Guinea under the relative protection of land-based Australian aviation which he considered best for a surprise factor.

On 10 March, during the Japanese landings at Lae-Salamaua, the American planes flew over the Owen Stanley Range and attacked Japanese targets in Rabaul, Lae and Salamaua, also seriously damaging or sinking Japanese transports and support vessels in Huon Gulf. The Americans suffered very light losses and inflicted severe damage to Japanese reinforcements, delaying Japanese plans to fortify recently conquered points in East New Guinea, which for some time were set up to support the so-called Australian occupation plan envisioned by the Japanese Navy's high command.

=== RAAF strikes ===
The Australian Army General Staff, responding to intelligence reports and reconnaissance reports of reinforcements arriving at Rabaul, ordered the Royal Australian Air Force (RAAF) to use air strikes against the base.

Such strikes occurred at low altitude, at great risk to the aircrews due to enemy antiaircraft fire, allowing Martin B-26 Marauder medium bombers to obtain notable success, sinking numerous auxiliary vessels, between them the Komachi Maru along with the destruction of most of the Japanese aircraft in the bases in the fortress, only leaving some old Mitsubishi A5M4 "Claude" fighters.

Later, the aircraft carrier Shōhō and aircraft transport Kasuga Maru arrived at Rabaul with a shipment of the newest Mitsubishi A6M2 Zeros (30 on carrier, 20 on auxiliary cruiser) to replace the previous losses, including spare parts and mechanics, along with other planes from the Philippines and Dutch Indies. With these new reinforcements in Rabaul, the Japanese continued their plans for the period.

== See also ==
- Bombing of Rabaul (November 1943)
