= Tavurvur =

Active stratovolcano near Rabaul, on the island of New Britain, in Papua New Guinea

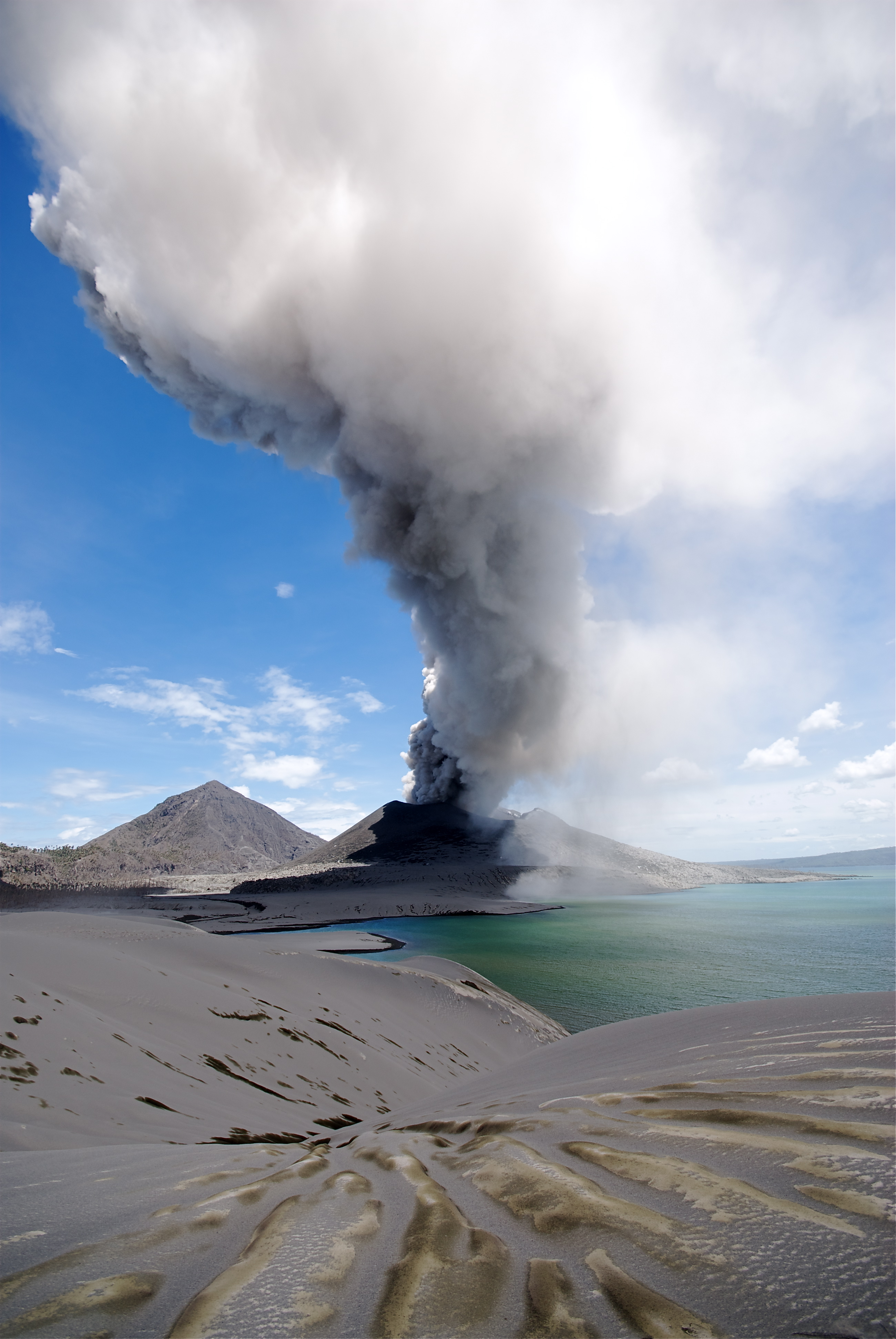
- Tavurvur erupting

Highest point
- Elevation: 688 m (2,257 ft)
- Coordinates: 4°14′20″S 152°12′36″E

Geography
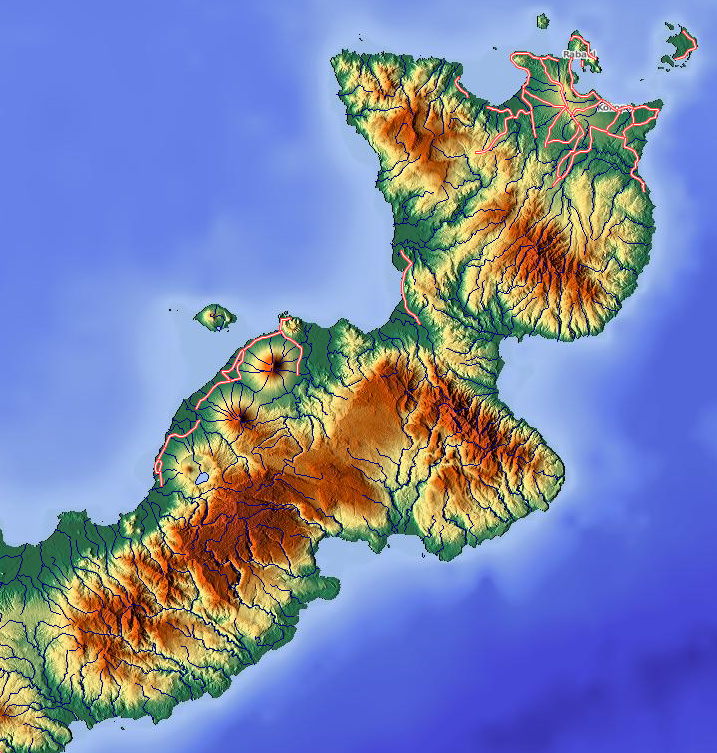
- Location within East New Britain Location within Papua New Guinea
- Location: East New Britain, Papua New Guinea

Geology
- Mountain type(s): Cinder Cone volcano, vent of Rabaul caldera
- Last eruption: August to September 2014

Tavurvur is an active stratovolcano near Rabaul, on the island of New Britain, in Papua New Guinea. It is a sub-vent of the Rabaul caldera and lies on the eastern rim of the larger feature. An eruption of the volcano largely destroyed the nearby town of Rabaul in 1994.

Mount Tavurvur is the most active volcano in Rabaul caldera, and erupted most recently on 29 August 2014.

The correct pronunciation of the volcano's name is tah-VOOR-voor, according to the Rabaul Volcanological Observatory.

== Gallery ==
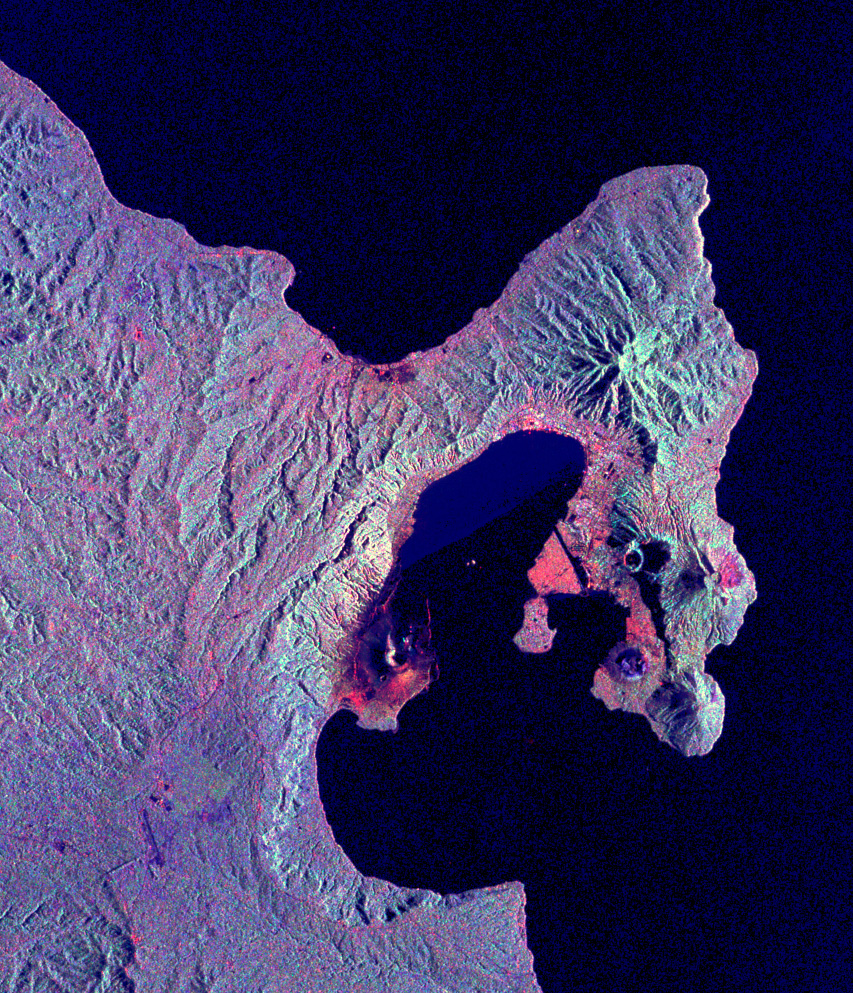
Space Radar Image of Rabaul Volcano

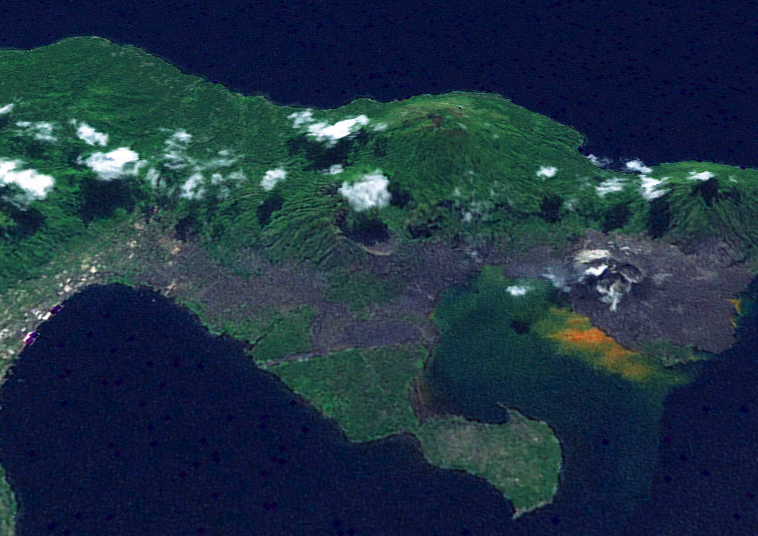
Tavurvur from Low Earth orbit

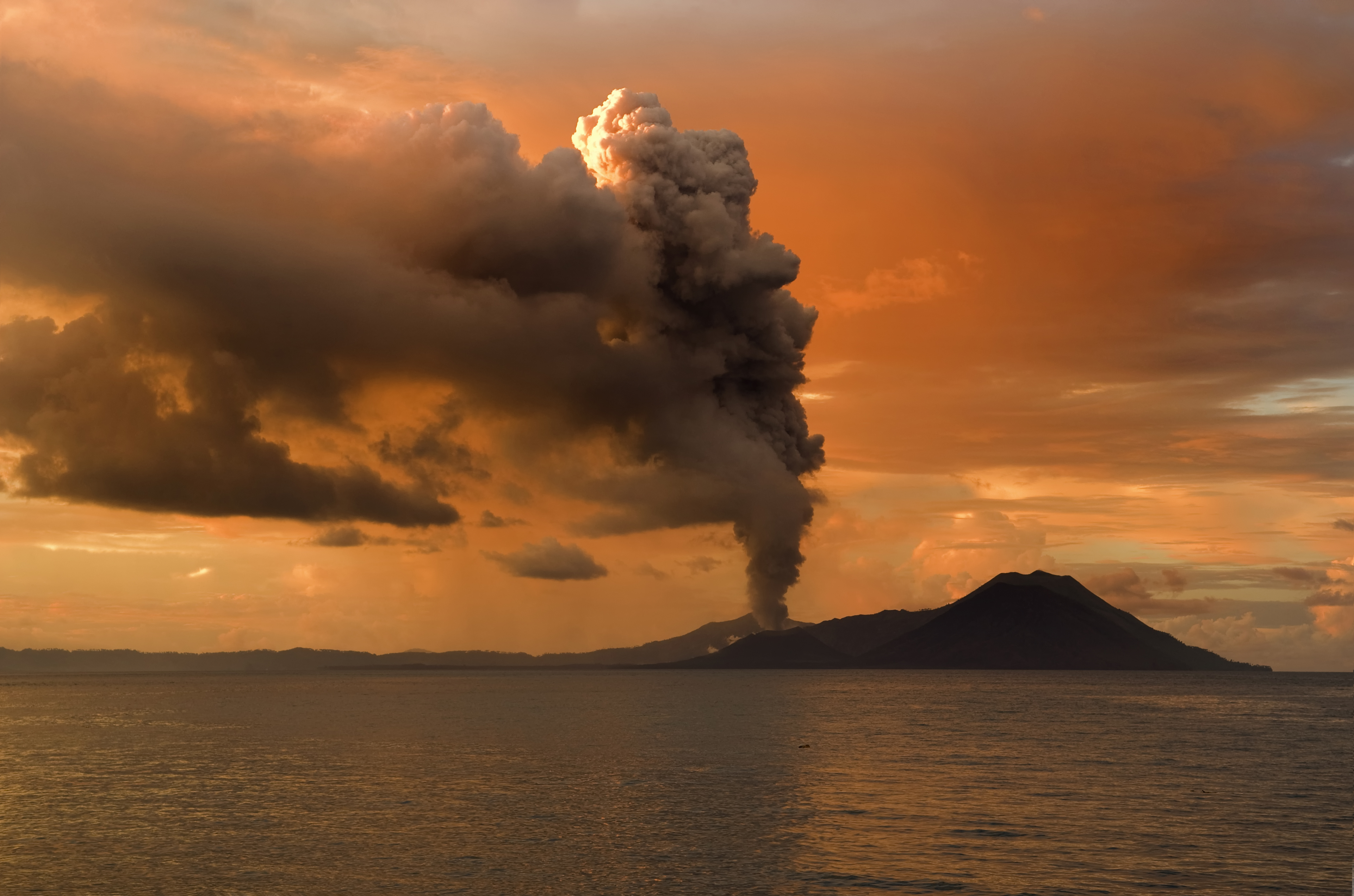
Tavurvur's 2009 eruption

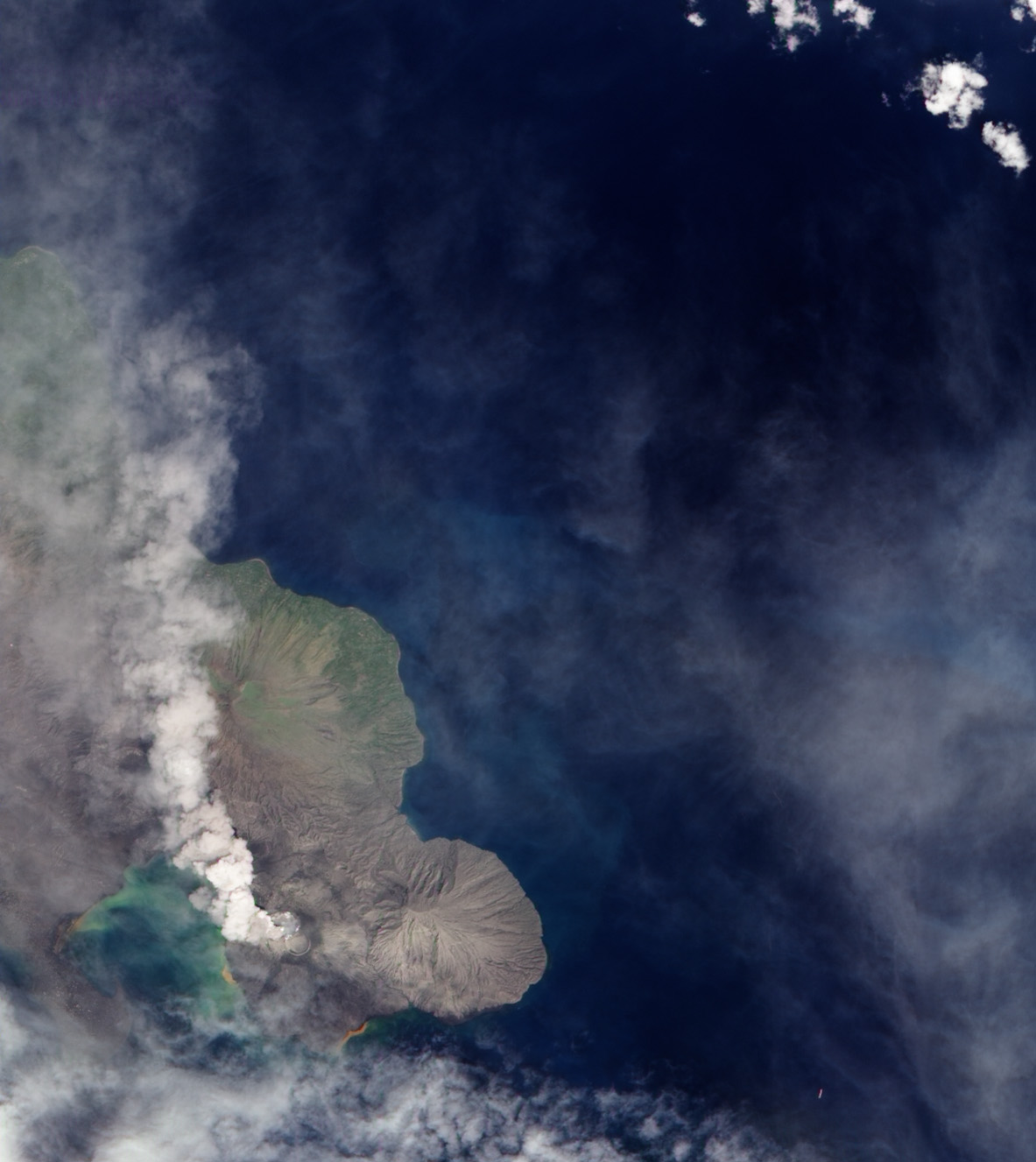
Ash plume from Tavurvur

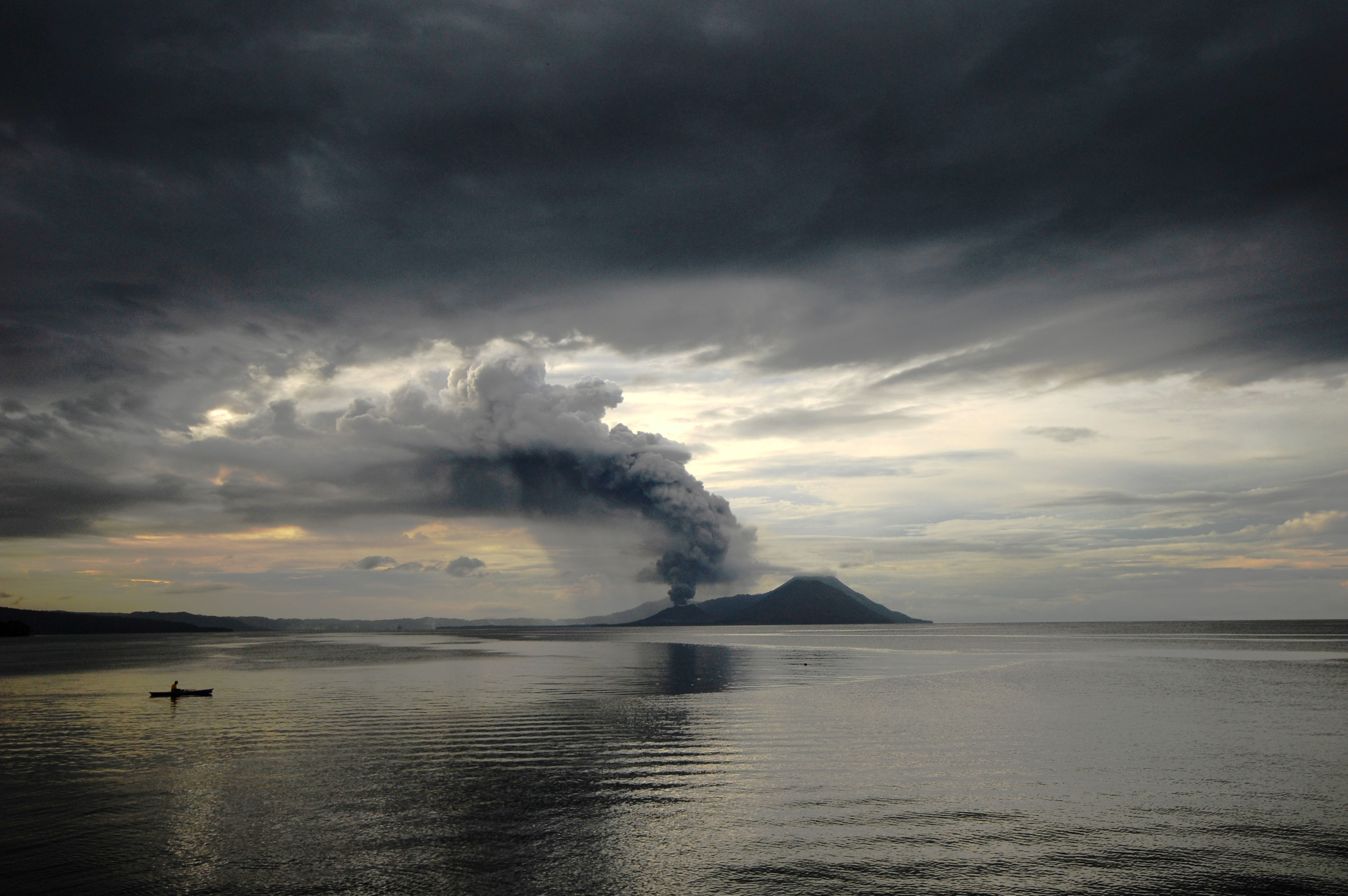

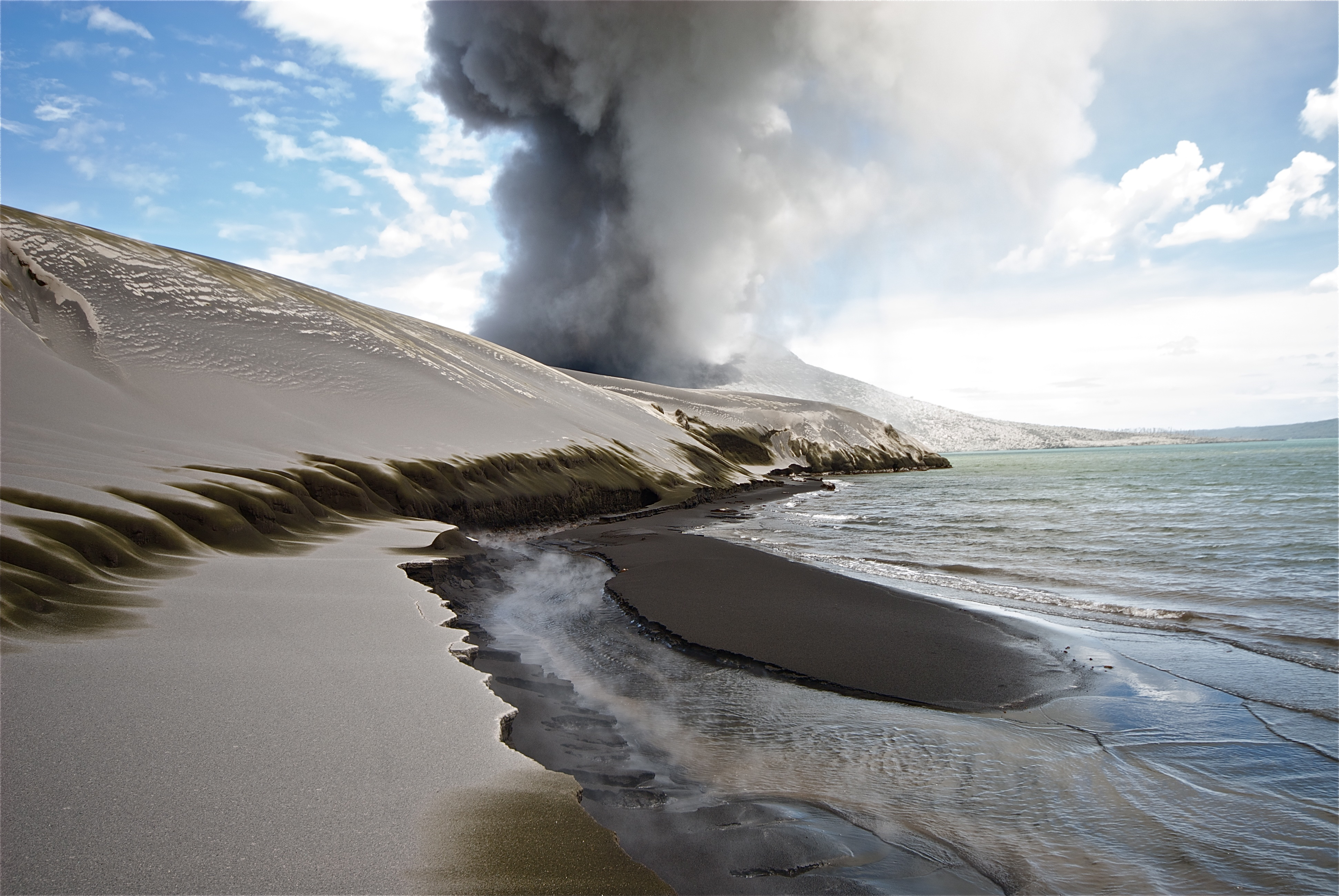
Dunes of volcanic ash near Tavurvur
