= Bombing of Rabaul (November 1943) =

Air attack on cruiser force in Rabaul

Coordinates: 4°11′58″S 152°10′4″E

Air attacks on Rabaul
- Part of the Pacific Theater of World War II
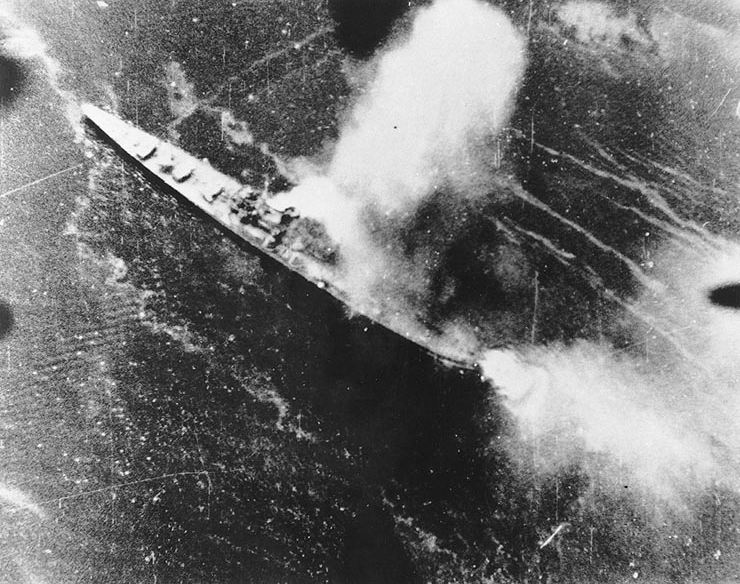
- Japanese cruiser Chikuma under attack on 5 November 1943.
Date	2–11 November 1943
Location	Rabaul on New Britain in the Bismarck Archipelago
Result	Allied victory

Belligerents
United States; Australia; New Zealand	Japan

Commanders and leaders
George Kenney (land air forces), William Halsey, Jr., Frederick Sherman (naval forces)	Mineichi Koga, Jinichi Kusaka

Strength
3 fleet carriers, 2 light carriers, 2 light cruisers, 9 destroyers, 282 carrier aircraft, 349 land-based aircraft	10 cruisers, 11 destroyers, 200 aircraft

Casualties and losses
10 carrier aircraft, 19 land-based aircraft destroyed (air raid at 2nd November	1 destroyer sunk, 4 cruisers heavily damaged, 2 cruisers lightly damaged, 52 aircraft destroyed

The bombing of Rabaul in November 1943 here refers to a series of concentrated air raids conducted by the allied military in World War II, against the major Japanese stronghold in New Guinea located at Rabaul between November 2 to 11. In response to the Allied invasion of Bougainville, the Japanese had brought a strong cruiser force down to Rabaul from Truk, their major naval base in the Caroline Islands about 800 miles north of Rabaul in preparation for a night engagement against the Allied supply and support shipping. Allied carrier- and land-based planes attacked the Japanese ships, airfields, and port facilities on the island of New Britain to protect the Allied amphibious invasion of Bougainville. As a result of the Rabaul raids, the Japanese surface forces could no longer threaten the landings. The carrier raid of 4th November was effective in disabling the Japanese surface fleet.

== Background ==
In early 1943, Rabaul had been distant from the fighting. However, the Allied grand strategy in the South West Pacific Area—Operation Cartwheel—aimed to isolate Rabaul and reduce it by air raids. Japanese ground forces were already retreating in New Guinea and in the Solomon Islands, abandoning Guadalcanal, Kolombangara, New Georgia and Vella Lavella.

Rabaul—on the island of New Britain—was one of two major ports in the Australian Territory of New Guinea. It was the main Japanese naval base for the Solomon Islands campaign and New Guinea campaign. Simpson Harbour—captured from Australian forces in February 1942—was known as "the Pearl Harbor of the South Pacific" and was well defended by 367 anti-aircraft guns and five airfields.

Lakunai and Vunakanau airfields were pre-war Australian strips. Lakunai had an all-weather runway of sand and volcanic ash, and Vunakanau was surfaced with concrete. Rapopo—14 mi (12 nmi; 23 km) to the southeast—became operational in December 1942 with concrete runways and extensive support and maintenance facilities. Tobera—completed in August 1943 halfway between Vunakanau and Rapopo—also had concrete strips. The four airfields had 166 protected revetments for bombers and 265 for fighters, with additional unprotected dispersal parking areas. A fifth airfield protecting Rabaul was Borpop airfield, completed in December 1942 across the St. Georges Channel on New Ireland.

The anti-aircraft defenses were well coordinated by army and naval units. Naval guns guarded Simpson Harbor and its shipping and the three airfields of Tobera, Lakunai, and Vunakanau. The army units defended Rapopo airfield, supply dumps and army installations; and assisted the navy in defending Simpson Harbor. An effective early warning radar system provided 90 mi (78 nmi; 140 km) coverage from Rabaul, and extended coverage with additional radars were on New Britain, New Ireland, and at Buka. These sets provided from 30 to 60 minutes' early warning of an attack.

Allied air raids had been dispatched to Rabaul regularly since the beginning of the war, though small in number and sometimes incurring heavy losses when made in daylight. Likewise, the Japanese frequently launched major airstrikes and air superiority fighter sweeps from Rabaul. Japanese air power at Rabaul had proven particularly troublesome for the allies during the drive on Munda point.

Rabaul was the key objective of all allied operations in the region. Though it gradually moved out of the limelight as the war moved on, its great air power warranted a large allied strategic offensive in the region aimed at capturing (later only neutralizing by air) Rabaul. To the Japanese, Rabaul was once a vital stronghold to defend the Solomons region, but was proving costly to reinforce. Towards the end of 1943 the combined fleet made several efforts to reinforce Rabaul, culminating in RADM. Koga ordering Operation RO, a large reinforcement of Rabaul with a large number of carrier aircraft, which transferred nearly all the carrier planes of the elite combined fleet to Rabaul by November 1st. The presence of these aircraft with their experienced aviators would be instantly felt by the allied Fifth Air Force during its major raid on November 2nd.

=== First raids on Rabaul ===
As a part of Operation Cartwheel, in the fall of 1943 the U.S. Fifth Air Force, the Royal Australian Air Force and the Royal New Zealand Air Force, all under the command of General George Kenney, began a sustained bombing campaign against the airfields and port of Rabaul. The initial mission was delivered by 349 aircraft on 12 October 1943, but it could not be followed up immediately because of bad weather. A single raid by 50 B-25 Mitchell medium bombers reached the target on 18 October. Sustained attacks resumed on 23 October, culminating in a large raid on 2 November.

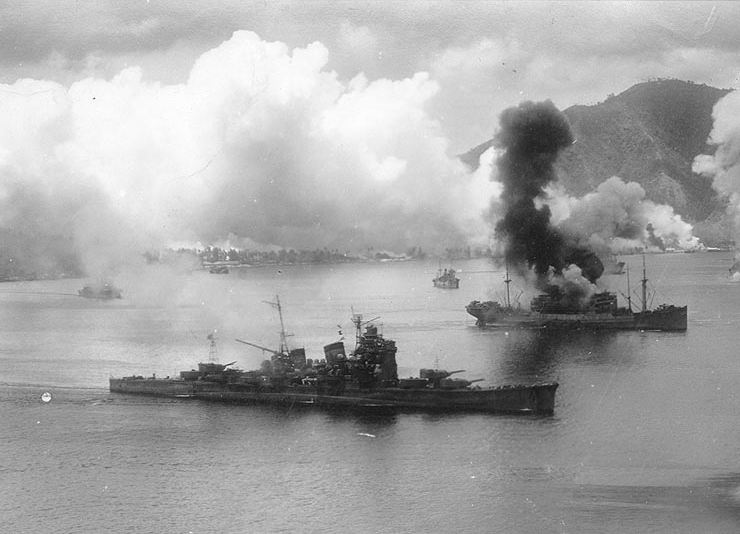
Japanese heavy cruiser Haguro and other shipping under attack at Rabaul, 2 November 1943.

In the 2 November mission, nine squadrons of B-25s, 72 bombers in total, and six squadrons of P-38 Lightnings totaling 80 fighter escorts attacked Simpson Harbor and its anti-aircraft defenses with bombing attacks and minimum altitude strafing runs. The raiding force encountered heavy resistance and 9 B-25s were shot down by anti-aircraft artillery or Japanese naval fighters and 10 of the P-38s were also shot down. Among the lost was Major Raymond H. Wilkins of the 3rd Attack Group, who was posthumously awarded the Medal of Honor. The defense encountered were described as the heaviest in the history of the Fifth Air Force. Though the pilots and Kenney made bombastic claims in terms of enemy ships sunk and aircraft destroyed, the raid actually inflicted light damage on the Japanese, who incurred a total of 20 aircraft lost in ground and air.

=== Japanese attacks on Bougainville ===
Admiral William Halsey was implementing the next phase of his advance up the Solomon chain and looked to establish a base on Bougainville. On Bougainville the Japanese had two airfields at the southern tip of the island, one at the northernmost peninsula, and a fourth on Buka just across the northern passage. Instead of attempting a costly assault on these heavily defended areas, Halsey landed his invasion force of 14,000 Marines at Empress Augusta Bay, about halfway up the west coast of Bougainville. There he would have his Seabees clear and build an airfield of their own.

On the night of 1/2 November the screening naval unit succeeded in defending the landing (the Battle of Empress Augusta Bay), but Admiral Mineichi Koga responded quickly: on the next day a large number of Rabaul-based aircraft raided the landing sites at Empress Augusta bay, and a force of Rabaul-based dive bombers tracked the allied surface fleet near Bougainville and bombed it, hitting one cruiser with three bombs in spite of the presence of AirSols fighters. Within the next few days the local cruiser force had been augmented with reinforcements from Truk. The Japanese had been conserving their naval forces over the past year, but in the face of the imminent threat to Rabaul they committed substantial resources in hopes of crushing the newly landed force and its naval support. The force refueled at Rabaul in preparation for the coming battle.

Halsey lacked comparable surface forces to oppose this fresh challenge. His main surface strength, two battleships and a number of cruisers, had been transferred to the Central Pacific to support the upcoming invasion of Tarawa. The only forces at hand were the carrier airgroups of Saratoga and Princeton. These would have been considered a potent force for a battle at sea, but Rabaul was a heavily fortified port with five airfields and extensive anti-aircraft batteries. Navy aviators had termed it "a hornet's nest". With the exception of the surprise raid at Pearl Harbor, no attack against such a formidable land target had been attempted by carrier aircraft. As such it was considered a highly dangerous mission for the aircrews and also placed the carriers at risk. Halsey later said the threat that the Japanese cruiser force at Rabaul posed to his landings at Bougainville was "the most desperate emergency that confronted me in my entire term as ComSoPac (Commander of the South Pacific Area)."

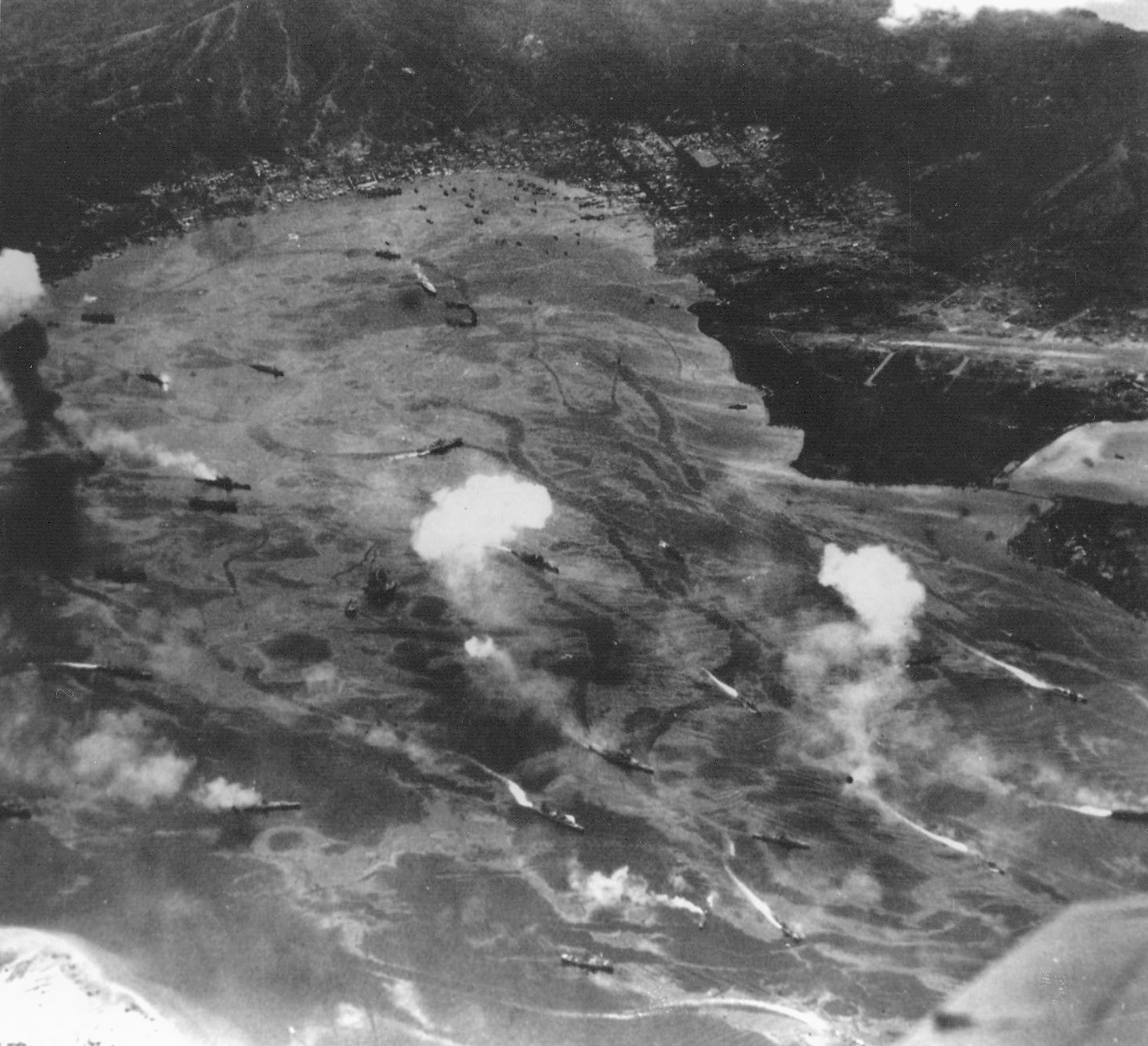
Japanese warships attempt to get under way while being attacked by US Navy aircraft.

== Major carrier attacks on Rabaul, disabling of the Japanese surface fleet ==
With the fate of the landing in the balance, Halsey ordered his carriers, under command of Rear Admiral Frederick C. Sherman, to steam north through the night of 4/5 November to get within range of Rabaul for a daybreak raid on the base. Approaching behind the cover of a weather front, Sherman launched all 97 of his available aircraft against the target, leaving no aircraft behind for combat air patrol over his ships. The aircrews were ordered to damage as many warships as possible, rather than attempting to achieve a sinking. Aircraft from airfields on Barakoma and the recently captured Vella Lavella were sent out to sea to rendezvous with the carrier force to provide it with some measure of protection.

On 5 November, the air raid on Rabaul began. The daybreak Navy air bombing of Rabaul was followed up an hour later with an Army Air Force raid by 27 B-24 Liberator heavy bombers of the Fifth Air Force, escorted by 58 P-38s. By the end of the attacks, six of the seven Japanese cruisers at Rabaul had been damaged, four of them heavily. Atago suffered near misses by three 500 lb (230 kg) bombs that caused severe damage and killed 22 crewmen, including her captain. Maya was hit by one bomb above one of her engine rooms, causing heavy damage and killing 70 crewmen. Mogami was hit by one 500 lb bomb and set afire, causing heavy damage and killing 19 crewmen. Takao was hit by two 500 lb bombs, causing heavy damage and killing 23 crewmen. Chikuma was slightly damaged by several near-misses. One bomb struck near Agano, which damaged an anti-aircraft gun and killed one crewman. Three destroyers were also lightly damaged.

The strike had been a stunning success, effectively neutralizing Koga's cruisers as a threat to the Bougainville mission. Under the threat of additional airstrikes, most of the Japanese warships departed for Truk the next day, practically ending Japanese naval presence in the area. Losses among the attacking aircraft were light.

Two days later an additional carrier unit, Task Group 50.3 of the U.S. 5th Fleet, reached Halsey, arriving on 7 November. These ships were among the first wave of newly built U.S. Navy warships and had only recently become operational. Commanded by Rear Admiral Alfred E. Montgomery, the task group consisted of the fleet carriers Essex and Bunker Hill and the light carrier Independence. Halsey used Montgomery's ships as well as Task Force 38 (TF 38) in a combined strike against Rabaul on 11 November. Sherman launched his strike from near Green Island, northwest of Bougainville, which attacked in bad weather at about 08:30. After its return, TF 38 retired to the south without being detected. Montgomery launched from the Solomon Sea 160 mi (140 nmi; 260 km) southeast of Rabaul.

== Aftermath ==
Agano—which had remained at Rabaul after the 5 November strike—was torpedoed and heavily damaged in these attacks. The destroyer Suzunami reportedly suffered a direct bomb hit while loading torpedoes near the mouth of Rabaul Harbor. She blew up and sank, killing 148 of her crew. In the wake of the raids the Japanese launched a series of counterattacks involving 120 aircraft against the U.S. carriers, but the force was intercepted and lost 35 planes without inflicting damage on Montgomery's ships.

The raids succeeded in protecting the Allies' recent gains, leaving Rabaul as an increasingly isolated outpost, difficult to supply and posing little danger to accelerating Allied operations in the region. The capture of Bougainville and Buka brought Rabaul into range of land-based US Navy and Marine Corps tactical bombers for the first time, setting the stage for the pacification campaign intended to neutralize Rabaul that began on 17 December 1943.

== See also ==
- Rabaul Airfield Complex
