= East Papuan languages =

Proposed, defunct language family

East Papuan
- (obsolete)
- Geographic distribution: Melanesia
- Linguistic classification: Proposed language family
- Subdivisions: Anêm; Ata; Baining (East New Britain); North Bougainville; South Bougainville; Central Solomon; Sulka; Kol; Kuot (Panaras); × Reefs – Santa Cruz (now Austronesian); × Kazukuru language (now Austronesian); × Yele

Language codes
- Glottolog: None

The East Papuan languages is a defunct proposal for a family of Papuan languages spoken on the islands to the east of New Guinea, including New Britain, New Ireland, Bougainville, Solomon Islands, and the Santa Cruz Islands. There is no evidence that these languages are related to each other, and the Santa Cruz languages are no longer recognized as Papuan.

All but two of the starred languages below (Yélî Dnye and Sulka) make a gender distinction in their pronouns. Several of the heavily Papuanized Austronesian languages of New Britain do as well. This suggests a pre-Austronesian language area in the region.

== History of the proposal ==
The East Papuan languages were proposed as a family by linguist Stephen Wurm (1975) and others. However, their work was preliminary, and there is little evidence that the East Papuan languages actually have a genetic relationship. For example, none of these fifteen languages marked with asterisks below share more than 2–3% of their basic vocabulary with any of the others. Dunn and colleagues (2005) tested the reliability of the proposed 2–3% cognates by randomizing the vocabulary lists and comparing them again. The nonsense comparisons produced the same 2–3% of "shared" vocabulary, demonstrating that the proposed cognates of the East Papuan languages, and even of proposed families within the East Papuan languages, are as likely to be due to chance as to any genealogical relationship. Thus in a conservative classification, many of the East Papuan languages would be considered language isolates.

Since the islands in question have been settled for at least 35,000 years, their considerable linguistic diversity is unsurprising. However, Malcolm Ross (2001; 2005) has presented evidence from comparing pronouns from nineteen of these languages that several of the lower-level branches of East Papuan may indeed be valid families. This is the classification adopted here.

== Classification (Ross 2005) ==
=== Small families ===
Each of the first five entries in boldface is an independent language family, not known to be related to the others. Languages that are transparently related to each other are listed together on the same line. The first family is a more tentative proposal than the others and awaits confirmation.

Reconstructed pronoun sets for each of the families are given in the individual articles.

Yele – West New Britain family

(Tentative; Yele may be Austronesian.)

- ? Yele – West New Britain
  - Yélî Dnye (Yele)* (Rossel Island)
  - West New Britain
    - Anêm* (New Britain)
    - Ata (Pele-Ata, Wasi)* (New Britain)

East New Britain family

- East New Britain
  - Baining: Mali*, Qaqet, Kairak, Simbali, Ura, Makolkol
  - Taulil–Butam: Taulil**, Butam (extinct)**

North Bougainville family

- North Bougainville
  - Keriaka
  - Konua (Rapoisi)**
  - Rotokas: Rotokas*, Eivo

South Bougainville family

- South Bougainville
  - Buin
    - Buin*
    - Motuna (Siwai)*
    - Uisai
  - Nasioi: Koromira, Lantanai, Naasioi*, Nagovisi (Sibe)**, Oune, Simeku

Central Solomon family

- Central Solomons
  - Bilua* (Vella Lavella Island)
  - Touo (Baniata)* (southern Rendova Island, part of the New Georgia Islands)
  - Lavukaleve* (Russell Islands)
  - Savosavo* (Savo Island)

* Dunn and colleagues found no demonstrable shared vocabulary between these fifteen languages.

** Ross considered these four languages in addition to the fifteen studied by Dunn and colleagues.

=== True language isolates ===
These three languages are not thought to be demonstrably related to each other or to any language in the world.

- **Sulka** isolate* – New Britain (poor data quality; the possibility remains that Sulka will be shown to be related to Kol or Baining)
- **Kol** isolate* – New Britain
- **Kuot (Panaras)** isolate* – New Ireland

* Dunn and colleagues found no demonstrable shared vocabulary between these fifteen languages.

=== Austronesian languages formerly classified as East Papuan ===
Wurm classified the three languages of the Santa Cruz and Reef Islands as an additional family within East Papuan. However, new data on these languages, along with advances in the reconstruction of Proto-Oceanic, has made it clear that they are in fact Austronesian:

- Reefs – Santa Cruz languages: Natügu, Nalögo, Nanggu, Äiwoo

Similarly, Wurm had classified the extinct Kazukuru language and its possible sister languages of New Georgia as a sixth branch of East Papuan. However, in a joint 2007 paper, Dunn and Ross argued that this was also Austronesian.

- Kazukuru family: Kazukuru language

== See also ==
- Papuan languages
