= Siwai =

Siwai may refer to:

- Siwai Rural LLG, in South Bougainville District, Papua New Guinea
- Siwai language, spoken in Bougainville, Papua New Guinea
- Sewar, a type of dagger

== See also ==
- Sewai, a town in Jharkhand, India
