= Sibe =

Sibe may refer to:

- Sibe people, an East Asian ethnic group living in China
- Xibe language, language of Sibe people
- Sibe Mardešić (1927–2016), Croatian mathematician
- Nagovisi language, a South Bougainville language spoken in Papua New Guinea
- Siberian Husky, a dog breed that is a member of the Spitz family

== See also ==
- Sibe language (disambiguation)
