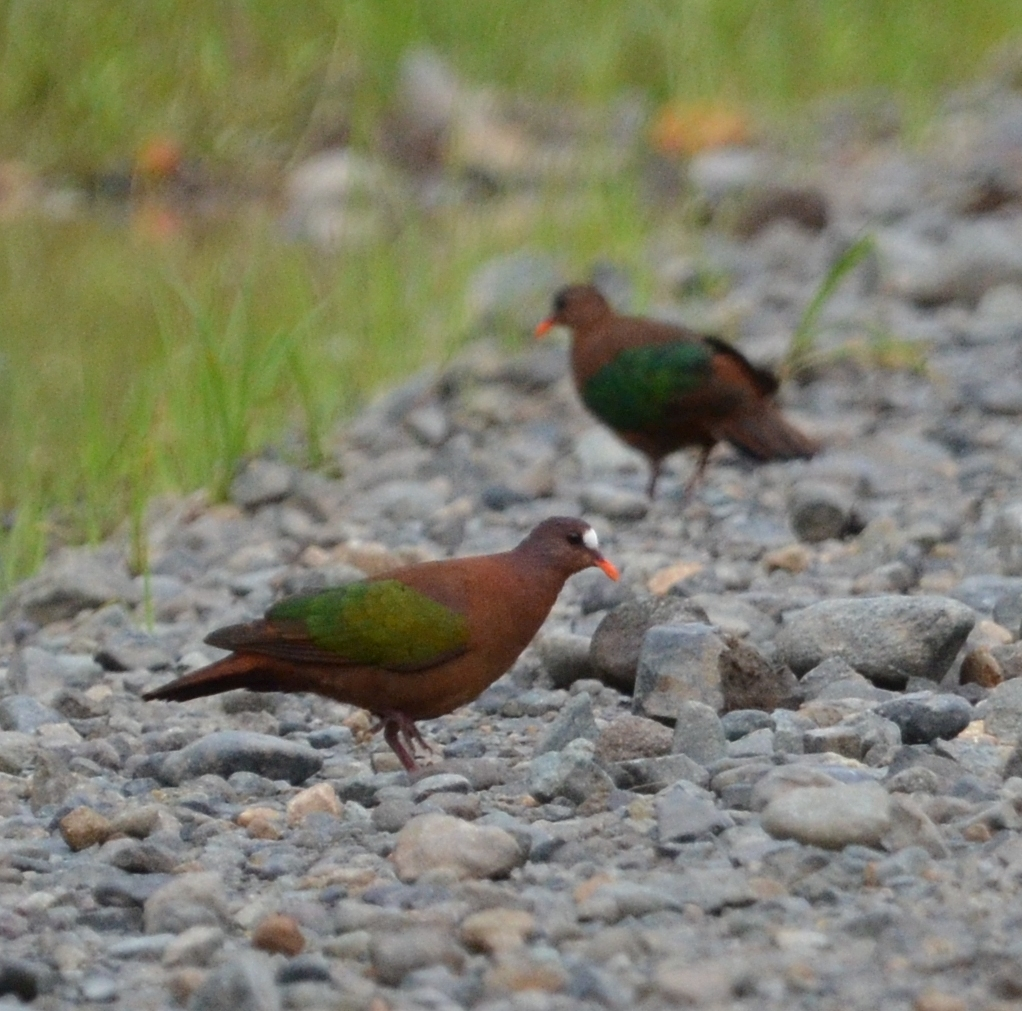

Conservation status
- Least Concern (IUCN 3.1)

Scientific classification
- Kingdom: Animalia
- Phylum: Chordata
- Class: Aves
- Order: Columbiformes
- Family: Columbidae
- Genus: Chalcophaps
- Species: C. stephani

Binomial name
- Chalcophaps stephani Pucheran, 1853

= Stephan's emerald dove =

Species of bird

Stephan's emerald dove, also known as Stephan's dove (Chalcophaps stephani), is a species of bird in the pigeon family Columbidae. Formally described by the French zoologist Jacques Pucheran in 1853, the dove is named after Étienne Jacquinot, the father of the French naturalist Honoré Jacquinot. The emerald dove has a large range in Indonesia and Melanesia, stretching from Sulawesi and Taliabu east through most of lowland New Guinea and its satellite islands to the Admiralty Islands, Bismarck Archipelago, and Solomon Islands. It is a forest-dwelling species that is usually seen in inland rainforests, although it can inhabit other wooded habitats like scrubby coconut plantations and coastal forests if competing species like the common emerald dove are absent. Stephan's emerald doves migrate locally in response to local climactic conditions and food availability.

The dove is mainly frugivorous, foraging on the forest floor for fallen fruits, seeds, and occasionally insects and other invertebrates. In New Guinea, the breeding season last from January to May during the wet season. The nest is a flimsy structure made of twigs, containing two cream or pale yellowish eggs. Stephan's emerald is listed as being of least concern on the IUCN Red List due to its large range and stable population. The species is fairly common throughout its range and is especially common on smaller islands in the Bismarck Archipelago.

== Taxonomy ==
Stephan's emerald dove was described as Chalcophaps stephani by the French zoologist Jacques Pucheran in 1853 based on specimens from Triton Bay, New Guinea. The name of the genus is from the Ancient Greek khalkos, meaning 'bronze', and phaps, meaning 'pigeon'. The specific name is in honour of Étienne Jacquinot, the father of the French naturalist Honoré Jacquinot and explorer and naval officer Charles Jacquinot. Stephan's emerald dove is the official common name designated by the International Ornithologists' Union. In English, the species is also called Stephan's dove, Stephan's ground-dove, brown-backed emerald dove, and brown-backed green-winged dove. Many of the indigenous languages spoken in the dove's range also have names for it. In Indonesian, it is called Delimukan timur. In the Papuan languages of Pamosu and Aiti, it is called bururovov-uru and prthithí, respectively. It is called Niboai/Pongapongao in Zia. In the Solomons, it is called bahlu pari in Cheke Holo, buti in Duke, and uririga and paimuraku in Buin.

Stephan's emerald dove is one of three species in the genus Chalcophaps, alongside the common and Pacific emerald doves. These three species are closely related and display a surprisingly low level of morphological and genetic diversity despite their large range, from tropical southern Asia through the western Pacific as far as Vanuatu. Stephan's emerald dove is the most genetically divergent species in the genus, differing from the other species by around 8% in terms of mitochondrial DNA. In contrast, the common and Pacific emerald doves only differ by around 2.4% in terms of mtDNA.

Genetic data from the populations on New Guinea, the Bismarck Archipelago, and the Solomon Islands suggests that Stephan's emerald dove spread from New Guinea to the Bismarcks and then to the Solomons, a west-to-east pattern common in Melanesian birds. These three populations are well-structured and moderately differentiated genetically, suggesting that they are undergoing the early stages of diversification needed for speciation. However, they are not yet divergent enough to be considered distinct species, which may be due to the dove's ability to travel between isolated islands with relative ease and ensure gene flow between different populations. Currently, there are three subspecies of Stephan's emerald dove recognised by the IOU:

- C. s. wallacei Brüggemann, 1877: It is found on Sulawesi and Taliabu.
- C. s. stephani Pucheran, 1853: The nominate subspecies, it is found on the Kai Islands and Aru Islands, mainland New Guinea, and the Bismarck Archipelago and D'Entrecasteaux Islands. It also occurs on many off New Guinea's satellite islands, including Yapen, Karkar, and the islands off the coast of Western New Guinea.
- C. s. mortoni Ramsay, 1882: It is found in the Solomon Islands, from Bougainville south to Makira and Santa Ana. Also found on the islands of Buka and Nissan off Bougainville.

== Distribution and habitat ==
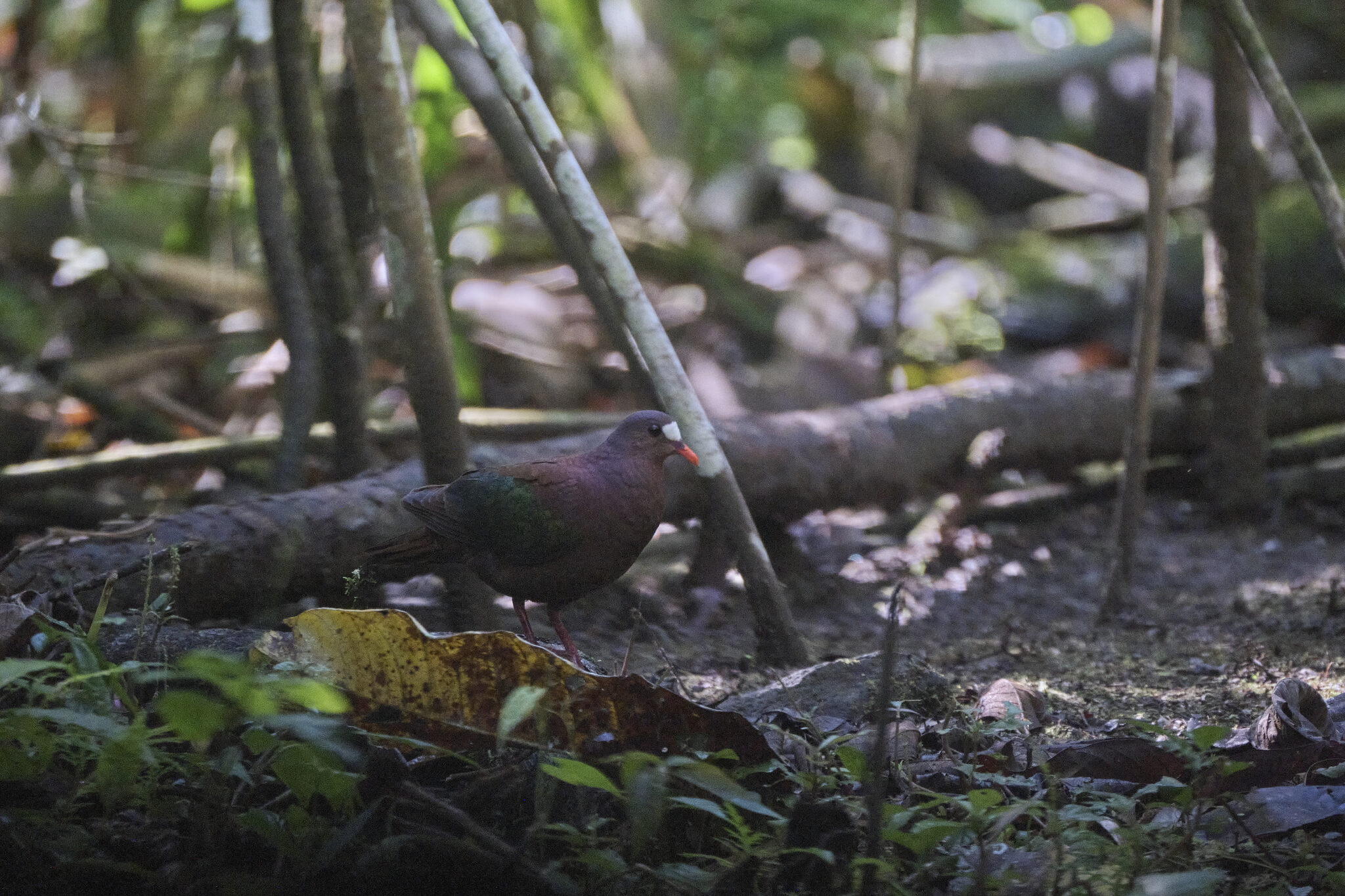
In West Papua

Stephan's emerald dove has a large range from Sulawesi and Taliabu east through most of lowland New Guinea and its satellite islands to the Admiralty Islands, Bismarck Archipelago, and Solomon Islands. In Indonesia, it is also found on the Kai and Aru Islands. In New Guinea, the satellite islands it occurs on include Misool, Waigeo, Yapen, Karkar, Goodenough, and Fergusson. In the Admiralty Islands, it occurs on Manus, Rambutyo, Nauna and Tong. In the Bismarck Archipelago, it is known from Duke of York Island, Lolobau, New Britain, New Hanover, Djaul, New Ireland, and Umboi, among other islands. In the Solomons, it is known from Bougainville, Nissan, Buka, Kolombangara, Choiseul, Isabel, Malaita, Guadalcanal, Makira, Ugi and Santa Ana, as well as many more smaller islands. It was recorded from Rennell Island for the first time in 2018, despite not being recorded from previous surveys of the island, suggesting that it may have colonised it recently.

Stephan's emerald dove is a forest-dwelling species that is usually seen in inland rainforests, especially where it lives alongside the common emerald dove, with the two species occupying different niches to avoid competition. In places where the Stephan's emerald dove does not occur alongside the common emerald dove, it inhabits a much more diverse array of woodland habitats, such as scrubby coconut plantations and coastal forests. In New Guinea, where Stephan's emerald dove lives alongside the white-breasted ground dove, it restricts itself to forest edge and secondary forests, with the ground dove occurring in the interior of forests. Stephan's emerald dove dislikes drier forests, especially in the dry season.

On Sulawesi, it is known from humid evergreen forests and secondary coastal forests. It usually occurs below 500 m (1,600 ft), but has been recorded at elevations of 925–1,375 m (3,035–4,511 ft) in Gunung Ambang Nature Reserve. It is known to inhabit heavily degraded and logged forests on Taliabu. In New Guinea, it is known from forest edge and secondary forests in the lowlands and is much more common in forest fragments than continuous forest. It is usually found below 700 m (2,300 ft) and is most common near sea level, but has been found as high as 1,097 m (3,600 ft) in the Kumawa Mountains and 1,420 m (4,660 ft) on Mount Karimui. On the Admiralty Islands, it is much more common in degraded habitats and coconut plantations than primary forest, and occurs at elevations of up to 750 m (2,460 ft).

Stephan's emerald dove migrates locally in response to local climactic conditions and food availability. A carcass of the dove was found on the Carstenz Massif in New Guinea in the 1970s at an elevation of 4,350 m (14,270 ft). This is almost 3,000 m (9,800 ft) above the normal altitudes the dove inhabits, suggesting it may also wander more widely.

== Behaviour and ecology ==
Stephan's emerald dove is inconspicuous but is not very shy. It is usually seen alone or in pairs, although small flocks can gather on the forest floor near reliable sources of food. It is a fast and direct flier, with a deep-chested appearance in flight similar to that of other emerald doves. When flushed, it frequently flies off to a nearby branch and perches while watching the intruder.

=== Diet ===
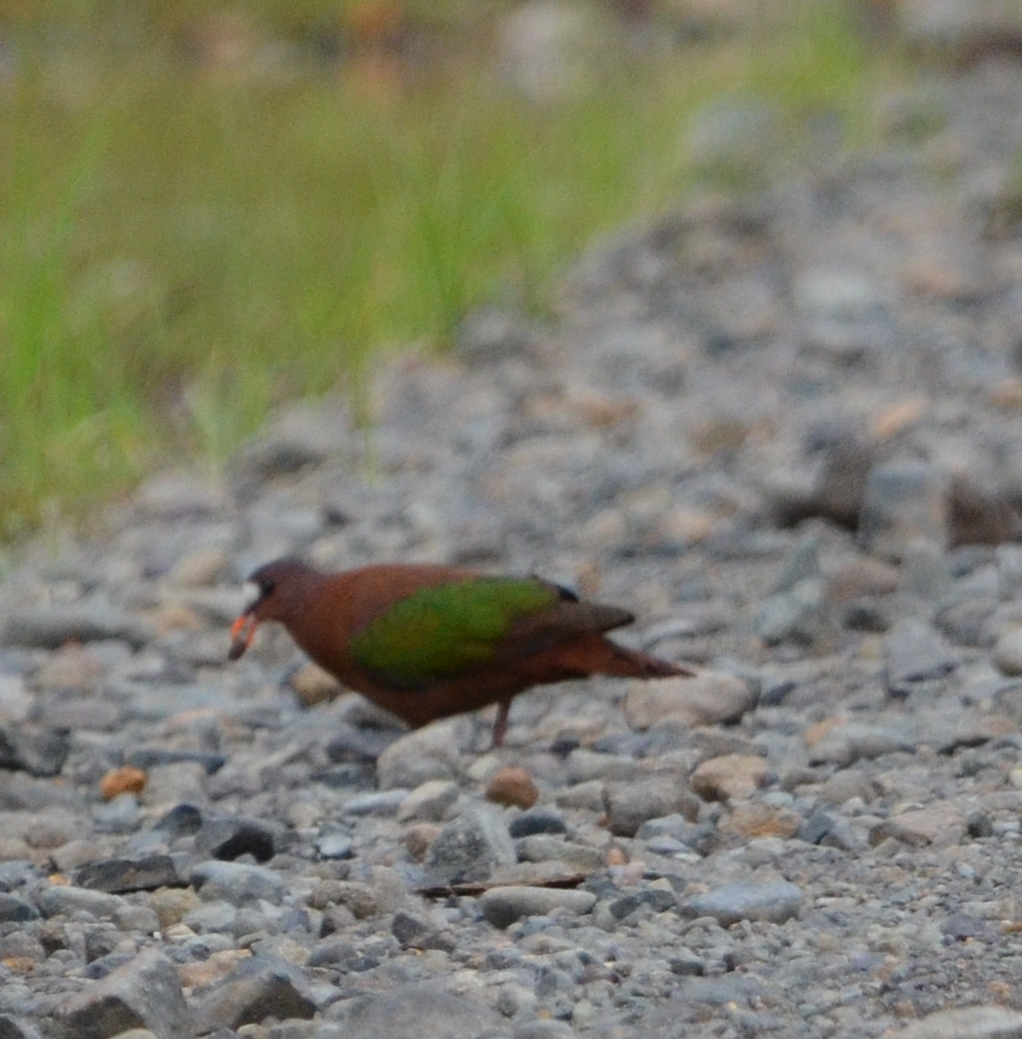
Feeding

The dove is mainly frugivorous, foraging on the forest floor for fallen fruits, seeds, and occasionally insects and other invertebrates. It is known to forage under nesting colonies of metallic starlings, feeding on the seeds in the starlings' droppings. Foraging sometimes occurs in short shrubs, but has not been observed high in the trees. It is known to eat soil.

=== Breeding ===
Male Stephan's emerald doves use several displays in the process of courtship. One display is used to attract females and is performed on a perch. It involves lowering the head and breast, while simultaneously raising the lower abdomen and tail to an angle of around 60°, before lowering them while slightly raising the wings. No sound is made while bowing and the tail is not fanned out. These bows are performed continuously and rhythmically in bursts of up to nine bows, with the male ceasing his display as soon as a female arrives. The display is highly noticeable in the wild, especially the rhythmic swinging of the body. If the male successfully attracts a female, she will perch besides him, following which he performs the bowing display. The bowing display involves the male facing the female with his head and neck tilted towards her. He keeps his wings close to the body and tail closed, while rapidly bobbing his head up and down, finishing in an erect posture. Captive females have occasionally been seen bobbing in response, but the occurrence of this behaviour in the wild is unconfirmed. Copulation takes place after the bowing display is finished; after copulating, males preen females and the two engage in billing.

In New Guinea, the breeding season last from January to May during the wet season, although one nest was found in July. The nest is a flimsy structure made of twigs resting on a pile of leaves and debris, placed on a fern or tree. It is usually built close to the ground but can be as high up as 10 m (33 ft). The dove lays two cream or pale yellowish eggs.

=== Parasites ===
Stephan's emerald dove is known to parasitised by Haemoproteus alveolates and the mites Columbicola guimaraesi and Mesonyssus hirtus.

== Conservation ==
Stephan's emerald is listed as being of least concern on the IUCN Red List due to its large range and stable population. The species is fairly common throughout its range and is especially common on smaller islands in the Bismarck Archipelago. Near Port Moresby, a 1982 survey found it to have a population density of four birds per ten hectares. The dove is known from protected areas including Gunung Ambang Nature Reserve in Sulawesi. It has been recorded from bird markets in Sulawesi.
