= LNI =

LNI may refer to:

- L.N.I., the Ligue nationale d'improvisation, the improvational comedy show
- LNI, the ICAO airline designator for Lion Air
- lni, the ISO 639 code for the Daantanai’ language
- LNI, the Lakota Nation Invitational, an annual multi-sport event tournament
