= South Bougainville languages =

Language family of Bougainville, Papua New Guinea

South Bougainville
- East Bougainville
- Geographic distribution: Bougainville Island
- Linguistic classification: One of the world's primary language families
- Subdivisions: Buinic; Nasioiic

Language codes
- Glottolog: sout2948
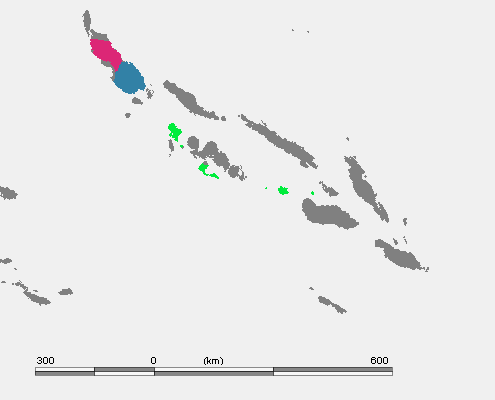
- Language families of the Solomon Islands. South Bougainville

The South Bougainville or East Bougainville languages are a small language family spoken on the island of Bougainville in Papua New Guinea. They were classified as East Papuan languages by Stephen Wurm, but this does not now seem tenable, and was abandoned in Ethnologue (2009).

== Classification ==
Glottolog v4.8 presents the following classification for the South Bougainville languages:

- South Bougainville
  - Buinic
    - Buin
      - Terei
      - Uisai
    - Siwai
  - Nasioiic
    - Nasioi
      - Simekuic
        - Avaipa
        - Simeku
      - South–Central Nasioi
        - Central Nasioi
          - Naasioi
          - Ounge
        - South Nasioi
          - Daantanaiʼ
          - Koromira
    - Sibe (Nasioi)

== Proto-South Bougainville ==
=== Pronouns ===
Ross reconstructed three pronoun paradigms for proto-South Bougainville, free forms plus agentive and patientive (see morphosyntactic alignment) affixes:

	I	we	you	s/he, they
free	*ni(ŋ)	*nee DL *ni PL	*da SG *dee DL *dai PL	*ba SG *bee DL *bai PL
patientive	*-m		*-d	*-b
agentive	*a	*o	*i or *e	*u

SG: singular; DL: dual; PL: plural

=== Lexicon ===
A detailed historical-comparative study of South Bougainville has been carried out by Evans (2009). Reconstructed Proto-South Bougainville lexicon from Evans (2009):

Proto-South Bougainville reconstructed lexicon

Gloss	Proto-South Bougainville
blood	*ereŋ
bone	*kōna
ear	*rome
eye	*rutɔ
fat, grease	*titi
guts	*kō
hand (arm)	*komɔ
head	*bore
knee	*mī
left (hand)	*mɔre-
liver	*nonɔŋ
neck	*kuru
nose	*keni
right (hand)	*mē-
tongue	*meneŋ
wing	*kupɔ
three	*be-
four	*kɔre-
ten	*nɔraŋ
brother (older of male)	*batato
brother (older of male)	*tāta
child	*tōtō
daughter (my)	*norɔ
father	*bomɔ
husband	*bɔ[m,ŋ]
man	*nugaŋ
mother	*bōko
person	*nɔmm[e,ai]
name	*mīŋ
son (my)	*nuri
wife	*bana
cloud	*kɔmo
dust	*rɔmo
garden	*kɔti
island	*mɔto
ocean	*maira
sand	*piti(a)
sea	*piruŋ
sky	*pɔn(iŋ)
smoke	*ī
sun	*rua
water	*doŋ
betelnut	*mōti
branch	*āgu
coconut (tree)	*mou
fruit, seed	*tinaŋ
leaf	*pɔda
mango	*baiti
sugarcane	*tɔnɔŋ
sweet potato	(*ane)
tobacco	*buru
tree	*koi
(tree) trunk	*mono
bird	*bɔrege
dog	*masika
eel	*baramɔ
fowl, chicken	*kokore
rat	*koto
bad	*orara
big	*pɔn(n)ɔ
black	*muŋ[i,o]
cold	*kamari
dirty	*kumi
far	*iti-
hungry	*perɔ
long, tall	*iti-
old	*uri-
sick	*tipɔ
thick	*mōtu
warm, hot	*tɔkɔtɔkɔ
white	*kākɔtɔ
fall	*ru-
flow	*tū
go	*be-
push	*tūme
put	*ti-
turn	*bero-
breathe, live	*roma-
cough	*k(o)u-
die	*bō
drink, eat	*nai
hear	*tarɔ-
sleep	*ati-
smell	*nū-
spit	*tutu-
suck	*muti-

== Austronesian influence ==
South Bougainville words of likely Proto-Oceanic origin:

language	family	pig	fence	left	fish	back	shark
Nagovisi	South Bougainville	polo	para	akona-	kalege	vilo	—
Nasioi	South Bougainville	poro	parang	mare-	taki	bilo'	—
Buin	South Bougainville	uuru	holo	mori-	iana	muure	paaoi
Motuna	South Bougainville	huuru	horo	mori-	koringi	muuri	pakoi
Proto-Oceanic	Austronesian	*borok	*bara	*mawiri	*ikan	*muri-	*bakiwa
Torau	Austronesian	boo	barabara	mairi-	iala	mudi-	vavoi
Uruava	Austronesian	boro	bara		iana	pou-	bakubaku
Mono-Alu	Austronesian	boʔo	—	karaka	iana	aro-	baʔoi

== Typology ==
South Bougainville languages have SOV word order, unlike the SVO Oceanic languages.

== See also ==
- Papuan languages
- North Bougainville languages
