= Uruava language =

Extinct Austronesian language

Uruava
- Region: Bougainville, Papua New Guinea
- Extinct: since the 1950s
- Language family: Austronesian: Malayo-Polynesian; Oceanic; Western; Meso-Melanesian; Northwest Solomonic; Mono–Uruavan; Uruava
- Writing system: Latin

Language codes
- ISO 639-3: urv
- Glottolog: urua1242
- ELP: Uruava
- Uruava is classified as Extinct by the UNESCO Atlas of the World's Languages in Danger

Uruava is an extinct Austronesian language formerly spoken in southeast Bougainville, Papua New Guinea.

The language was spoken around Arawa. It was recorded shortly before its speakers shifted to the non-Austronesian Nasioi language.
