= Rajrappa Area =

- Location in Jharkhand Rajrappa Area (India)
- Location: Ramgarh Coalfield; 23.590044°N 85.677131°E
- Company: Central Coalfields Limited
- Website: centralcoalfields.in/cmpny/hstry.php

Rajrappa Area is one of the operational areas of the Central Coalfields Limited located in the Ramgarh district in the state of Jharkhand, India.

The projects of the Rajrappa Area are: Rajrappa OCP and Rajrappa Washery. The area office is at Rajrappa 829101.

== Mining activity ==
Collieries in the CCL Ramgarh Coalfield
U: Underground colliery, O: Open Cast colliery, M: Mixed colliery, W: Washery, S: Facility, A: Administrative headquarters, CT: census town, H: historical, religious, tourist centre
Owing to space constraints in the small map, the actual locations in a larger map may vary slightly
Cities, towns and locations in Ramgarh district in North Chotanagpur Division
M: municipality, CT: census town, R: rural/ urban centre, T: tourist centre, P: power plant
Abbreviation used- TPP: thermal power project
Owing to space constraints in the small map, the actual locations in a larger map may vary slightly

=== Mines and projects ===
Rajrappa open cast project and Rajrappa washery have been operational for several decades. The detailed project report for Rajrappa open cast project for a rated capacity of 3.0 million tonnes of run-of-mine coal capacity was sanctioned by the government in 1983. Rajrappa washery was designed for a rated capacity of 3 million tonnes of run-of-mine capacity in 1975. Earlier, the entire project was operational south of the Damodar River.

Rajrappa OCP and washery are located in the Ramgarh Block-I, Block II & Block-IV in the south-eastern part of Ramgarh Coalfield. Block I&IV is located in Ramgarh district south of the Damodar River and Block II is located in Bokaro district north of the Damodar River. Block I&IV and Block II are separated by the Damodar River. Earlier only Blocks II &IV were operated. Production in Rajrappa OCP was 2.72, 2.84 and 2.35 million tonnes in 1991–02, 1992-93 and 1993-94 respectively. It was 1.53, 1.91, 1.31 million tonnes in 2015–16, 2016-17 and 2017-18 respectively.

As per a pre-feasibility report prepared in 2018, Rajrappa OCP and Rajrappa Washery will have an annual capacity of 3 million tonnes. All the three blocks on both sides of the Damodar River would be worked. Total estimated life of the mine and washery is 29 years.

== Illegal mining activities ==
According to the Report on Prevention of Illegal Coal Mining and Theft, “The main source of illegal mining of coal and theft is abandoned mines. After economic extraction is over, the remaining coal in an abandoned mine is stolen by coal mafias, villagers leading to roof falling, water flooding, poisonous gas leaking, leading to the death of many labourers.”In the Ramgarh Coalfield of CCL, illegal mining activities are taking place in Karma old quarry, Sugia, Rauta, Gidhania, Burakhap old quarry. Rajrappa – I, II & III quarry. Illegal mining also takes place in the fringe areas and outside the leasehold areas of CCL.

== Educational facilities for employees’ children ==
Central Coalfields Limited provides support for reputed institutions/ trusts for setting up 10+2 pattern CBSE schools for children of CCL employees. It provides 109 buses to employees’ children to schools and back. Among the schools in the Ramgarh Coalfield/ surrounding areas that receive financial help or structural support are: DAV Gandhinagar, DAV Rajrappa, DAV Barkakana.

== Medical facilities ==
In the Ramgarh Coalfield, CCL has the following facilities:

Silver Jubilee Hospital Rajrappa mines at Sewai with 20 beds has 3 general duty medical officers. Among the facilities it has are: x-ray, laboratory. It has 2 ambulances.

CWS Hospital at Barkakana (independent unit) with 11 beds has 3 general duty medical officers. Among the facilities it has is: laboratory. It has 1 ambulance.

There are central facilities in the Central Hospital, Gandhinagar at Kanke Road, Ranchi with 250 beds and in the Central Hospital, Naisarai at Ramgarh with 150 beds.
