= Sibe language =

The Sibe language may refer to:

- Xibe language in Xinjiang, China
- Nagovisi language in Bougainville, Papua New Guinea
