= East Pomio Rural LLG =

Local-level government in Papua New Guinea

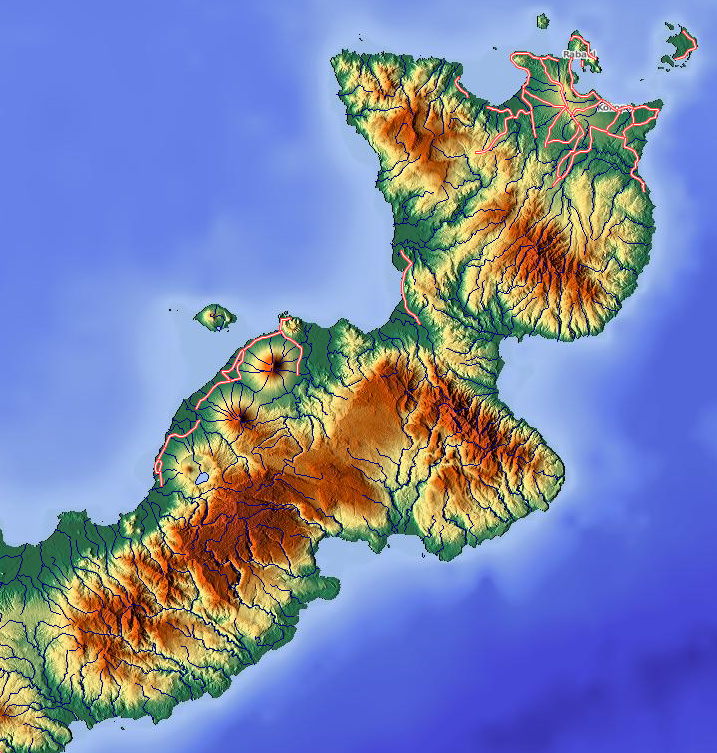
- Location within Papua New Guinea
- Coordinates: 5.194039°S 151.991156°E
- Country: Papua New Guinea
- Province: East New Britain Province
- Time zone: UTC+10 (AEST)

East Pomio Rural LLG is a local-level government (LLG) of East New Britain Province, Papua New Guinea. The Sulka language is spoken in the LLG, including in the village of Guma.

== Wards ==
- 01. Lamarain
- 02. Long
- 03. Hoya
- 04. Kaukum
- 05. Milim
- 06. Guma
- 07. Klampun
- 08. Sampun-Tagul
- 09. Teimtop-Wawas
- 10. Bain
- 11. Raolman
- 12. Ivai
- 13. Setwei
