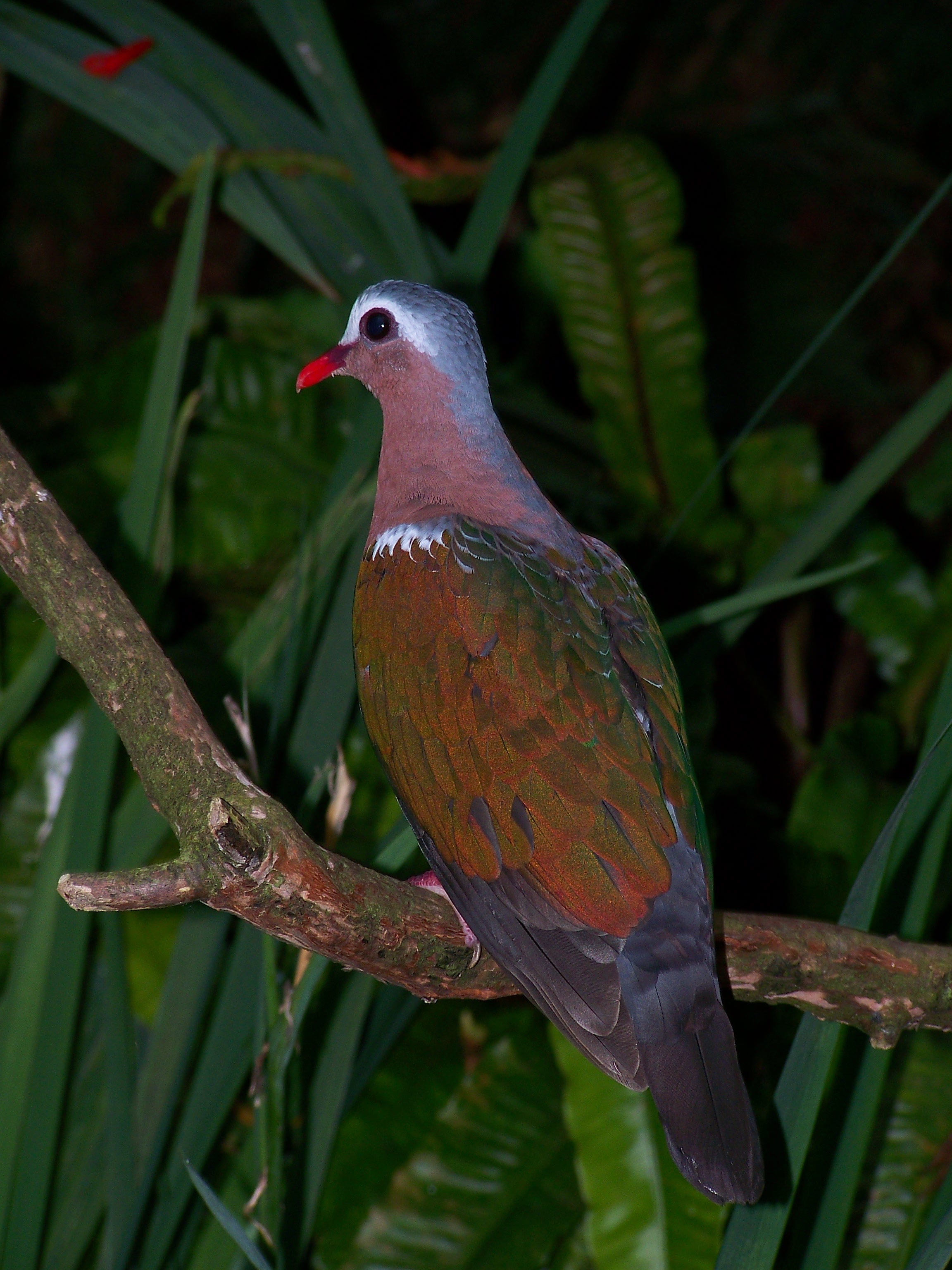
- Common emerald dove, Chalcophaps indica

Scientific classification
- Kingdom: Animalia
- Phylum: Chordata
- Class: Aves
- Order: Columbiformes
- Family: Columbidae
- Tribe: Chalcophabini
- Genus: Chalcophaps; Gould, 1843

Type species
- Columba chrysochlora Wagler, 1827

Species
- See text.

= Chalcophaps =

Genus of birds

Chalcophaps is a genus of small doves, commonly called emerald doves, that are found in Indomalaya and Australasia.

== Taxonomy ==
The genus Chalcophaps was introduced by the English ornithologist John Gould in 1843. The genus name combines the Ancient Greek khalkos meaning "bronze" and phaps meaning "pigeon". The type species is the common emerald dove (Chalcophaps indica).

The genus contains three species:

Genus Chalcophaps – Gould, 1843 – three species
Common name	Scientific name and subspecies	Range	Size and ecology	IUCN status and estimated population
Common emerald dove or grey-capped emerald dove	Chalcophaps indica (Linnaeus, 1758)	India to south China, Malaysia, Philippines, Indonesian and west Papuan islands	Size: Habitat: Diet:	LC
Pacific emerald dove or brown-capped emerald dove	Chalcophaps longirostris Gould, 1848 Four subspecies: C. l. timorensis Bonaparte, 1856; C. l. longirostris Gould, 1848; C. l. rogersi Mathews, 1912; C. l. sandwichensis Ramsay, 1878	Australia, Lord Howe and Norfolk Islands, New Guinea, Santa Cruz and Banks Islands, Vanuatu, New Caledonia	Size: Habitat: Diet:	LC
Stephan's emerald dove	Chalcophaps stephani Reichenbach, 1851	Sulawesi, New Guinea and the Solomon Islands.	Size: Habitat: ' Diet:	LC

Members of this genus are small and short-tailed.
