= Savosavo language =

Language of the Solomon Islands

Coordinates: 9.13°S 159.81°E

Savosavo
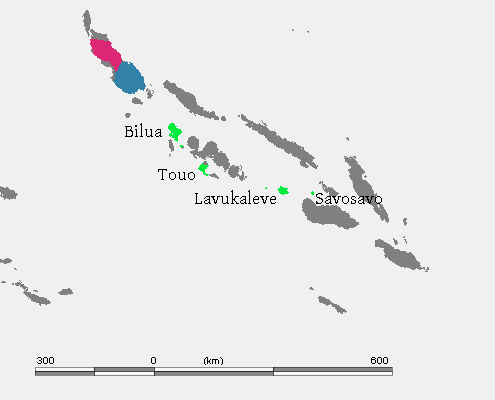
- Map of central Solomon languages
- Native to: Solomon Islands
- Region: Savo Island, north of Guadalcanal, Central Solomons.
- Native speakers: (2,400 cited 1999)
- Language family: Central Solomons: Savosavo

Language codes
- ISO 639-3: svs
- Glottolog: savo1255
- ELP: Savosavo
- Savosavo is classified as Definitely Endangered by the UNESCO Atlas of the World's Languages in Danger.

Savosavo is an endangered language spoken on Savo, a small volcanic island north of Guadalcanal in the Solomon Islands. Savosavo is one of the Central Solomon languages, which are Papuan languages, unlike most of the languages in the vicinity, which are members of the Oceanic branch of the Austronesian language family. There are close to 3,000 speakers of Savosavo, and it is the easternmost Papuan language in the Pacific. The closest Papuan language to Savosavo is the Central Solomon Lavukaleve, spoken in the Russell Islands to the west. Other neighbor languages are Bughotu, Ghari, and Lengo, Bughotu is to the north, while Ghari and Lengo are to the south, and are spoken on Guadalcanal.

== Speakers ==
Speakers on Savo are known as agriculturalists. Vegetables and fruit are the main source of food while fish, chicken, and rice round out the overall diet. Rice is also an important commodity, but it has to be bought and is not grown on Savo. A large number of people on Savo are without regularly paid work. To earn income, they sell commodities such as cocoa beans or garden produce at local markets or in the capital Honiara.

Clan lineages are important to the people of Savo, as it makes up their social organization. A clan leader is known as 'chief' and there is one for each of the six clans on Savo. These leaders are all part of the Savo Ghizi Kato House of Chiefs and are important on the local levels. The six clans are Ghaubata, Kakau, Lakuili, Kiki, Tanakidi, and Zoqo. Land in Savo is owned by the clans and not the individuals. Each member of the clan has the rights to a portion of land, but it must be connected to his/her mother's ancestors.

The Central Province is known to have the lowest literacy rates of the Solomon Islands. As a result, literacy of languages such as Savosavo are small. The language is rarely used in writing, since most people only go through a few years of schooling. Savosavo is used in minor situations such as letters, notes, and notices to the public.

== Phonology ==
Savosavo has five vowels and 17 consonants.

Savosavo Vowel Phonemes
	Front	Central	Back
Close	i		u
Mid	e		o
Open		a	

Savosavo Consonant Phonemes
		Labial	Alveolar	Palatal	Velar
Plosive	voiceless	p	t		k
Plosive	voiced	ᵐb	ⁿd	ᶮɟ	ᵑɡ
Nasal		m	n	ɲ	ŋ
Fricative	voiceless		s		
Fricative	voiced		z		
Trill			r		
Lateral			l		
Approximant		β̞			ɰ

Vowels have no length contrast, and the vowels /e/, /i/, /o/, and /u/ vary freely between different allophones.

=== Consonants ===
In total there are four places and six manners of articulation for consonants.

There are three voiceless stops: /p/, /t/, and /k/ and four voiced stops: /b/, /d/, /ɟ/ and /g/.

Minimal contrast between consonants
	Initial	Medial
p:b	puzu 'waist' buzu 'breadfruit'	kapu 'to be full' kabu 'to run away'
p:v	pazu 'palm leaf' vazu 'to bud'	sape 'to follow' savea 'fin'
b:v	boli 'intestines' voli-li 'to buy'	labu 'belly button' lavu 'place'
b:m	barata 'hillside' marara 'to be bright'	kaba 'shell' kama 'armpit'
t:d	tada 'man' dada 'to be afraid'	pata-li 'to separate rope' pada-li 'to count'
d:n	data 'outside' nata 'flat area'	vudu '(boy)friend' vunu-li 'to smell'
d:r	doi 'earth' roi 'to sink'	kudo 'hen' kuro 'pot'
r:l	raju 'level ground' l-aju 'to finish'	kuro 'pot' kulo 'seawards'
r:n	rata 'to be slippery' nata 'flat area'	ura 'crayfish' una 'earring'
s:z	sala 'to follow' zala-li 'to look for'	posovata 'yellow' pozogho 'bottom'
g:ng	qasi-li 'to close' ngasi 'to be hard'	koqa-li 'to erect posts' konga-li 'to worship'

=== Vowels ===
The vowels have no length contrast, and the vowels /e/, /i/, /o/ and /u/ vary freely between different allophones.

Sequences of identical vowels are not allowed in Savosavo. All other sequences are allowed.

- a and e – ae (to be married)
- e and a – onea (to listen)
- i and o – pio (man)
- o and e – dodoe (4th gen relative)
- u and i – koi (eight)

Minimal contrast between vowels
	Initial	Final
a:e:i	aghe 'we' eghe 'Ngali nut tree' ighe 'recently'	kata 'bushwards' k-ate 'to hold' kati 'bushwards'
o:u	ora 'to burn' ura 'crayfish'	kao 'bushwards' k-au 'to take'

== Orthography ==
The Savosavo language has 5 vowels (a, e, i, o, u) and 17 consonants (b, d, g, gh, j, k, l, m, n, gn, ng, p, r, s, t, v, z). This is the Anglican orthography. In the Catholic orthography, G is written Q, and Gh is written G. In other orthographies, Gn is written Ñ, and Ng is written N̄.

== Grammar ==
=== Verbs ===
Verbs usually mark tense, aspect and mood. They are by far the largest word class in Savosavo, making up 47% of the overall word class. There are three types of verbs in Savosavo.

==== Transitive verbs ====
Transitive verb stems have object marking. These verbs usually agree with their object in person (number) and in the third person singular (gender) using suffixes, prefixes, and stem modification.

- Stems taking prefixes only:
  - l-agha 'to marry'
  - l-aka 'to help '
  - l-au 'to take'
  - l-eghe 'to see'
  - l-ogha 'to weave'
  - l-ogo 'to collect'
- Stems taking both prefixes and suffixes:
  - l-ave-li 'to kill'
  - l-ogho-li 'to fill'
  - l-ova-li 'to bite'
  - l-ogha-li 'to own'
  - l-ame-li 'to give'
  - l-esgangi-li 'to spoil'
- Stems showing stem modification
  - sala 'to follow'
  - solo 'to throw'
  - pala 'to make'
  - bola 'to shoot'
- Stems taking suffixes only:
  - aghi-li 'to pull'
  - jurake-li 'to shatter'
  - rami-li 'to shoot'

==== Intransitive verbs ====
Intransitive verb stems usually are without object marking. The suffix -vi can only be used on four intransitive verbs. When the suffix is added, there also has to be an object marking suffix.

- sogha (to jump) + -vi = sogha-vi-li
- raghe (to run) + -vi = raghe-vi li
- sara (to reach) + -vi = sara-vi-li
- tete (to balance) + -vi = tete-vi-li

There are also transitive verbs that cannot be transitivized. Examples are ngori 'to snore', bo 'to go', and vige 'to dry'.

==== Ambitransitive verbs ====
Ambitransitive verb stems can occur with or without object marking. These verbs use suffixes to mark their object.

- ghavi 'to paddle' = ghavi-li 'to paddle a canoe'
- ale 'to enter' = ale-li 'to enter something'
- sali 'to wash away' = sali-li 'to wash something away'
- kasanga 'to be angry' = kasanga-li 'to be angry about'

=== Nouns ===
Nouns are the second largest word class in Savosavo, making up around 40% of the overall word class. Nouns can be derived from verbs by the suffix -ghu. Another way to differentiate nouns from verbs is the concept of reduplication. This occurs when nouns can be duplicated to insinuate a verb.

- elu 'Ngali nut' = élu~elu 'to gather Ngali nuts'
- kumara 'sweet potato' = kuma~kumara 'to harvest sweet potatoes'
- kosu 'bird' = kosu~kosu 'to hunt for birds'
- itoro 'walking stick' = ito~itoro 'to walk with a walking stick'

Many of the language names were actually made by reduplicating the place where the language was spoken. This is how Savo~savo came to be.

Overall, nouns are required to be verbalized using the suffix -sa in order to function as the head of a verb phrase:

Lo mavutu=na ka molumolu-sa-zu.
'The place was already an island.'

== Number System ==
Savosavo's number system is based on the decimal counting system. What is interesting about this counting system is that there are two different words for 'one'. These words are ela and pade. Ela is usually used either in counting or to denote the numeral 'first'. As a modifier it means 'some'.

Moka ela mapa=gha=na ata tetegha=la.
'Maybe some people (are) here at the mountain.'

Pade as a modifier is usually shortened to pa.

No pa kibo=e loa=na.
'That is one of your sins.'

1	ela (pade/pa)	30	ighivaleza
2	edo	40	aghavaleza
3	ighiva	50	aratale
4	aghava	60	poghoatale
5	ara	70	poghoroatale
6	poghoa	80	kuiatale
7	poghoro	90	kuavatale
8	kui	100	pa kela
9	kuava	200	edo kela
10	atale	269	edo kelagha poghoatale kuava
11	panipiti	999	kuava kelagha kuavatale kuava
20	nebolo	1,000,000	pa mola

Besides numerals, there are also other quantifiers:

- alea 'how many, however many'
- elave 'some more'
- padenge 'only one'
- pameve/pame 'one more'
- daivata 'plenty'
- du(lo) 'all'
- palea/paleva 'few'
