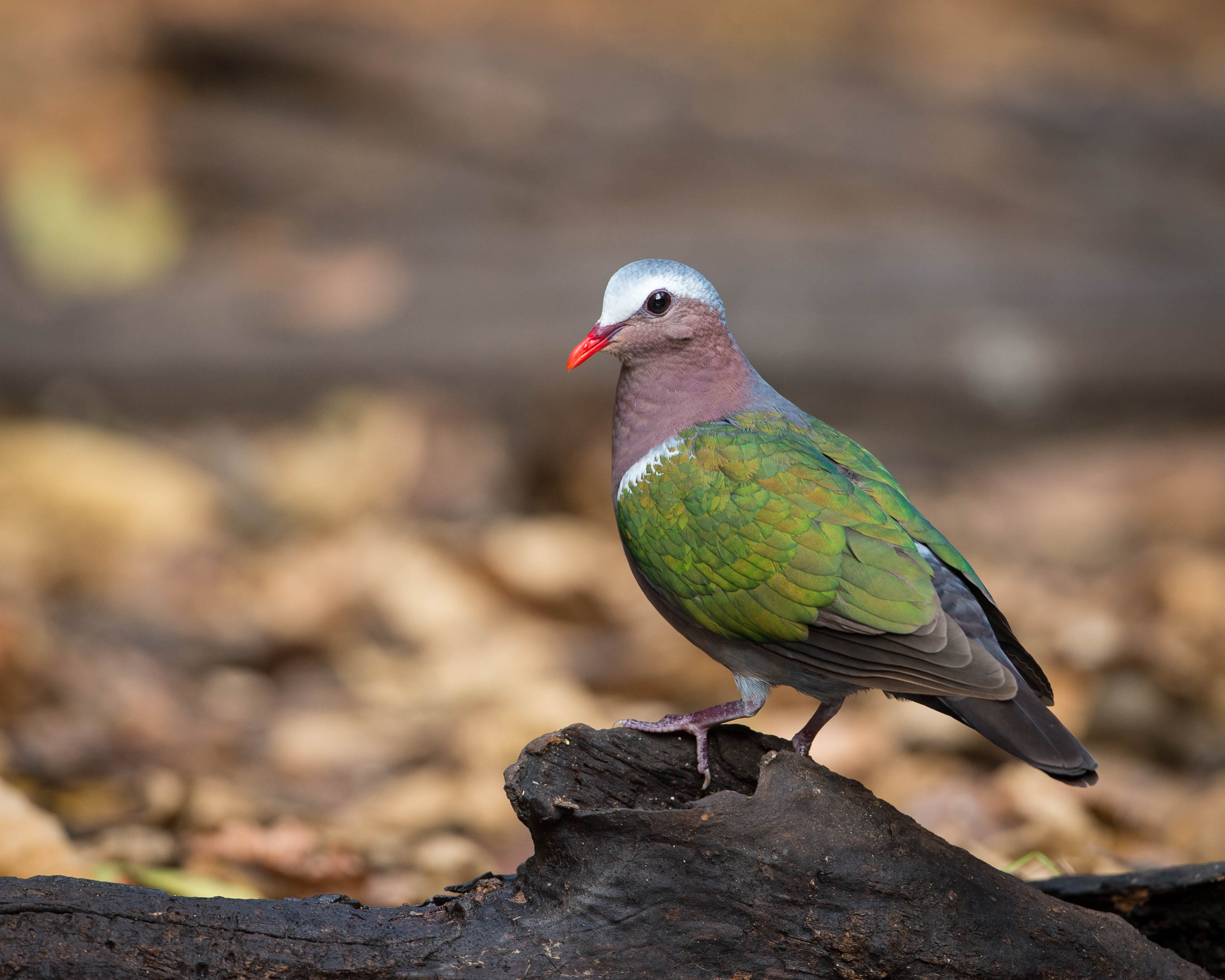
- Male
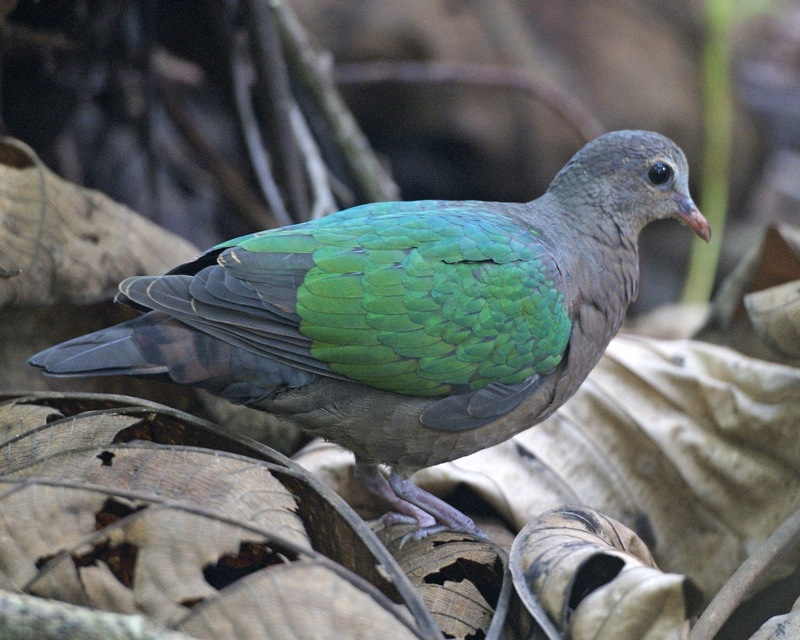
- Female

Conservation status
- Least Concern (IUCN 3.1)

Scientific classification
- Kingdom: Animalia
- Phylum: Chordata
- Class: Aves
- Order: Columbiformes
- Family: Columbidae
- Genus: Chalcophaps
- Species: C. indica

Binomial name
- Chalcophaps indica (Linnaeus, 1758)

Subspecies
- See text

Synonyms
- Columba indica Linnaeus, 1758

= Common emerald dove =

Bird species

The emerald dove or common emerald dove (Chalcophaps indica), also called Asian emerald dove and grey-capped emerald dove, is a widespread resident breeding pigeon native to the tropical and subtropical parts of the Indian subcontinent and Southeast Asia. The dove is also known by the names of green dove and green-winged pigeon. The common emerald dove is the state bird of the Indian state of Tamil Nadu. The Pacific emerald dove and Stephan's emerald dove were both considered conspecific.

== Taxonomy ==
In 1743, the English naturalist George Edwards included a picture and a description of the common emerald dove in his A Natural History of Uncommon Birds. He used the English name "Green Wing'd Dove". His drawing was made from a live bird at the home a merchant in Rotherhithe near London. Edwards was told that the dove had come from the East Indies. When in 1758 the Swedish naturalist Carl Linnaeus updated his Systema Naturae for the tenth edition, he placed the common emerald dove with all the other pigeons in the genus Columba. Linnaeus included a brief description, coined the binomial name Columba indica and cited Edwards's work. The specific epithet indica is Latin for "Indian" and is used by Linnaeus to denote the East Indies. The species is now placed in the genus Chalcophaps that was introduced by the English ornithologist John Gould in 1843.

Six subspecies are recognised:

- C. i. indica (Linnaeus, 1758) – India to south China, Malaysia, Philippines, Indonesian and west Papuan islands
- C. i. robinsoni Baker, ECS, 1928 – Sri Lanka
- C. i. maxima Hartert, 1931 – Andaman Islands
- C. i. augusta Bonaparte, 1855 – Nicobar Islands
- C. i. natalis Lister, 1889 – Christmas Island (Indian Ocean)
- C. i. minima Hartert, 1931 – Numfor, Biak and Mios Num islands (off north New Guinea)

== Description ==
The common emerald dove is a stocky, medium-sized pigeon, typically 23–27 cm (9.1–10.6 in) in length. The back and wings are bright emerald green. The flight feathers and tail are blackish, and broad black and white bars show on the lower back in flight. The head and underparts are dark vinous pink, fading to greyish on the lower belly. The eyes are dark brown, the bill bright red and legs and feet rufous. The male has a white patch on the edge of the shoulders and a grey crown, which the female lacks. Females will tend to have a browner complexion with a grey mark on the shoulder. Immature birds resemble females but have brown scallops on their body and wing plumage.

== Distribution and habitat ==
This is a common species in tropical forests and similar dense wet woodlands, farms and mangroves. It builds a scant stick nest in a tree up to five metres and lays two cream-coloured eggs.

== Behaviour and ecology ==
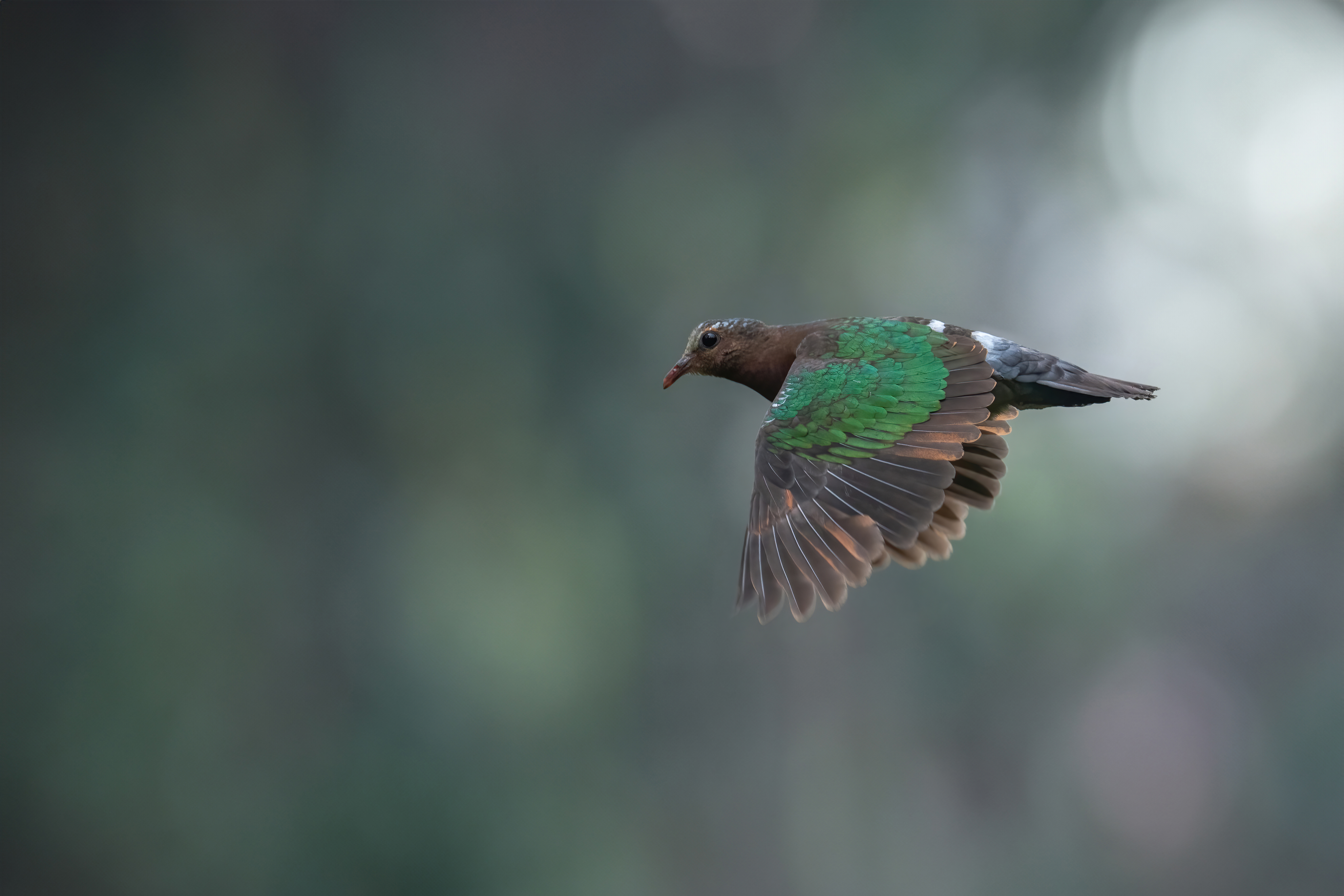
In flight

The call of the common emerald dove is a low soft moaning cooing consisting of about six to seven coos, starting quietly and rising. It also calls a nasal "hoo-hoo-hoon". Males perform a bobbing dance during courtship display. It is either single, or occurs in pairs or in small groups. It searches for fallen fruit on the ground and spends little time in trees except when roosting. It eats seeds and fruits of a wide variety of plants and is generally tame and approachable. Its flight is fast and direct, with the regular beats and an occasional sharp flick of the wings which are characteristic of pigeons in general. It often flies low between patches of dense forest, but when disturbed, it frequently walks away. It is a particularly good weaver when flying through forests.
