= Kol language (Papua New Guinea) =

Language isolate of Papua New Guinea

Kol
- Native to: Papua New Guinea
- Region: East New Britain Province
- Native speakers: (4,000 cited 1991)
- Language family: Language isolate (related to Sulka? East Papuan?)

Language codes
- ISO 639-3: kol
- Glottolog: kolp1236
- ELP: Kol

The Kol language is a language spoken in eastern New Britain island, Papua New Guinea. There are about 4000 speakers in Pomio District of East New Britain Province, mostly on the southern side of New Britain island.

Kol appears to be a language isolate, though it may be distantly related to the poorly attested Sulka language or form part of the proposed East Papuan languages.

== Phonology ==
=== Consonants ===
Consonants of Kol
	Labial	Alveolar	Palatal	Velar
Plosive	p b	t		k g
Nasal	m	n		ŋ
Rhotic		r		
Lateral		l		
Fricative		s		
Approximant	w		j	

/b, r/ can be realized as [β, d] as intervocalic allophones. /r/ is pronounced as [d] when following a nasal consonant.

=== Vowels ===
Kol displays vowel length contrast.

Vowels of Kol
	Front	Back	
High	i iː	u uː	
Mid	e eː	o oː	
Low	æː	ɑ ɑː	ɒ ɒː

== Vocabulary ==
The following basic vocabulary words are from SIL field notes (1962, 1981), as cited in the Trans-New Guinea database:

gloss	Kol
head	ˈkel.a; kela keřne
hair	ˈkomɒ; komɔʔ kalɛane
ear	ˈbula; bula kɛřlɛ
eye	pelnɛl; ˈpenel
nose	taˈli:; tali keřne
tooth	ˈmire; mi̠řɛ kɛřnɛ
tongue	dal kɛřnɛ; raal
leg	pe:re
louse	ˈtare; ta̠řɛ
dog	kuˈɒ:; kwa
pig	bu
bird	ˈule; ulɛ
egg	ˈkondola; kondo̠la
blood	ˈbe:la
bone	ˈti:le
skin	tomalu gomo; toˈmolu
breast	ˈtombo; to̠to la̠nɛ
tree	ˈti:nel; ti̠nɛl
man	mo; tɒ: ˈti:niŋ
woman	daiƀɛ; ra:l
sun	ˈkarege; kařɛ̠qɛ
moon	ˈigu; i̠qu
water	ˈgonu; qu̠nu
fire	kuˈoŋ; kuɔŋ
stone	ˈlela; lɛla
road, path	kɛrɛa; ˈkeria
name	ˈole
eat	mo raŋ kal oŋ; tam·a
one	ˈpusuɒ; titus
two	tɛřɛŋ; teˈtepe

== See also ==
- East Papuan languages
