= Sulka language =

Language isolate of Papua New Guinea

Sulka
- Native to: Papua New Guinea
- Region: eastern Pomio District, East New Britain Province
- Native speakers: (2,500 cited 1991)
- Language family: Language isolate

Language codes
- ISO 639-3: sua
- Glottolog: sulk1246
- ELP: Sulka
- Coordinates: 5.275769°S 152.092315°E

Sulka is a language isolate of New Britain, Papua New Guinea. In 1991, there were 2,500 speakers in eastern Pomio District, East New Britain Province. Villages include Guma (5.275769°S 152.092315°E) in East Pomio Rural LLG. With such a low population of speakers, this language is considered to be endangered. Sulka speakers had originally migrated to East New Britain from New Ireland.

== Geographic distribution ==
Sulka is spoken along the coastal region of Wide Bay, on the Southern coast of the Gazelle Peninsula, on the eastern side of New Britain Island, Papua New Guinea. Some estimate speakers to number as high as between 3,000 and 3,500. Reesink (2005) reports on some Sulka speakers who have intermingled in neighboring villages with speakers of other languages such as Mali, southeast of Kokopo.

== Classification ==
Sulka may be described as having ancient Papuan (non-Austronesian) roots, which additionally displays morphosyntactic constructions and some vocabulary items associated with the Oceanic branch of Austronesian (i.e. languages of the St. George linkage such as Mali). Alternatively, it has been proposed as possibly related to Kol or Baining as part of the East Papuan proposal, but Palmer (2018) treats Sulka as a language isolate.

Sulka has some influence from the Mengen language.

Over 3,000 to 3,500 years ago, the linguistic ancestors of Sulka speakers arrived in the Papua New Guinea area.

== History ==
Although the history of the language is not well known, it may display a mixture of Oceanic and Papuan language traits. These are languages Sulka came into contact with, when the peoples speaking these other languages populated the area in neighboring villages, around 3,200 years ago.

== Phonology ==
=== Consonants ===
The phonological system of Sulka comprises 28 contrasting segments, fourteen consonants, and seven vowels. On the topic of consonants, there is no recent evidence to support contrast between [b] and [β], therefore they're assumed to be allophones and are represented in the table of consonants as [β] only.

Sulka consonants are:

		Bilabial	Alveolar	Palatal	Velar	Uvular	Glottal
Stop	voiced		(d)		g	(q)	
Stop	voiceless	p	t		k		
Nasal		m			ŋ	(ɴ)	
Fricative		β	s		(ɣ)	(ʁ)	h
Lateral			l				
Trill			r				
Approximant				j			

=== Vowels ===
For its vowels, Sulka has a contrast between three front vowels: high, mid, and low, [i], [e], and [ε], but there is no instance of the central high vowel [ɨ]. However, when it comes to vocalic contrasts, it is not always clear. The mid front vowel may fluctuate somewhere between close-mid [e] and the more central-close vowel [ɪ], pronounced like English i in 'in'. The sounds [o] and [u] often fluctuate with each other as in the example of '1SG verbal pronoun' [ku] and [ko]. This pattern of fluctuation seems to commonly occur for high front vowels. When looking at the length of vowels, long vowels are often confused with diphthongs.

		Front	Back
Close	short	i	u
Close	long	iː	uː
Mid	short	e ~ ɪ, ɛ	o, ɔ
Mid	long	eː	oː, ɔː
Open	short	a	
Open	long	aː	

The seven vowel sounds can be found in the following words:

IPA	Meaning
[hip]	'tree wallaby'
[hep]	'bed'
[hɛp]	'make fire'
[lul]	'flow'
[lol]	'carry (PL object)'
[yok]	'namesake'
[yɔk]	'taro'
[ko]	'there'
[kat]	'again'

The words below contain closed syllables which are the only attested words showing that syllable length is phonemic:

IPA	Meaning
[iːs]	'able, enough'
[pkɔːn]	'hornbill'
[harpeːt]	'fall'
[βuːt]	'fall (lightly)'
[poːm]	'push'
[naːk]	'grave mound'

== Lexicon ==
A great majority of Sulka's lexicon is not Oceanic/Austronesian as stated by Schneider. However, there are a few words that are shared between both Papuan and Oceanic.

Examples from Geelvink (2005):

- pun 'base', as in a ho ka pun 'the tree its base', reflects POC
- puqun. Laufer (1955:42) gives Mengen pun ~ Gunantuna (= Tolai) vuna as evidence for the presence of Mengen speakers along the Wide Bay before Sulka speakers arrived from South New Ireland. But Sulka pun is not a recent Mengen loan. Rath (1986, ex. 324) gives bega pu-na for 'tree base-3SG.POSS'.
- nut 'island' ~ POC *nusa, with reflexes such as nui in NNG and nua in PT, nuta in Southeast Solomonic (Ross, Pawley, and Osmond 2003:42).
- kus 'rain' appears to reflect POC *qusan (Ross, Pawley, and Osmond 2003:141); with kue as reflex in Mengen (Poeng dialect).
- kopoi 'fog' ~ POC
- kapu(t); *kopu (Ross, Pawley, and Osmond 2003:140).
- malo 'skirt made of bark from the breadfruit tree'. The Sulka form is identical to the one found in Mengen and Kove of the North New Guinea linkage, rather than to mal as it appears in languages of the St. George linkage. Of course, it may be a recent direct borrowing from Mengen.

=== Nouns ===
Selected Sulka nouns showing singular and plural forms (Tharp 1996: 161–163):

gloss	singular	plural
‘part’	mhe	mhetor
‘vagina’	kha	khator
‘house’	rɨk	rɨktor
‘hole’	nho	nhotor
‘cliff’	vɨk	vɨktor
‘colorful belt’	lɨp	lɨptor
‘knife’	kom	komtok
‘water’	yi	yitok
‘heart’	ngaung	ngaungtok
‘nose’	vorngap	vrongtok
‘green lizard’	gut	gɨtok
‘song’	kni	knituk
‘head’	lpek	lpetuk
‘morning’	rot	ruteik
‘string bag’	psang	vasngeik
‘family’	valngan	valngneik
‘charcoal’	valang	valngeik
‘finger nail’	pga	pgeik
‘small garden plot’	sar	sareik
‘vein’	spang	sapngeik
‘shoulder’	volha	volheik
‘sky’	volkha	volkheik
‘mountain’	vul	vleik
‘container’	kolhi	kolheik
‘wild pitpit’	ngaiphe	ngaiphol
‘snake’	vim	vimol
‘bat’	viɨng	viɨngol
‘disciplining stick’	khap	khapol
‘fruit’	mit	mitol
‘mushroom’	tling	tinngol
‘fish’	slang	sinngol
‘meat’	vothek	vothol
‘place’	ngaekam	ngaekmol
‘roof of mouth’	kning	kningol
‘reed’	psiɨng	psiɨngol
‘bird’	ngaining	iningol
‘edge’	ngaiting	itngol
‘monster’	ngainkuo	inkuol
‘sister’s brother’	lu	rlok
‘mountain’	vul	vlik
‘coconut leaf’	kriar	kerik
‘forehead’	lein	leinik
‘kina shell’	ngaek	igik
‘fetish’	tarmek	tarmki
‘lobster’	hivotek	hivotgi
‘coss-buai’	rongtep	rongtvi
‘root’	kavgot	kvukti
‘lake’	ngaenker	enekri
‘lime’	ngaiker	ikri
‘anger’	ngaesik	resik
‘ear’	ngaela	rela
‘door’	ngaegot	relot
‘job’	ngaeha	reha
‘wing’	ngaeho	reho
‘road’	ngaelot	relot
‘sound’	ngaeti	reti
‘type of kaukau’	ngoye	roye
‘brawl’	ngaus	raus
‘brother’s brother’	nopia	rnopeik
‘father’s daughter’	kvɨk	rkvɨk
‘father’s father’	poi	rpoik
‘sister’s brother’	lu	rlok
‘brother’s sister’	etem	rotmik
‘father’s son’	hal	rhol
‘reef’	kamngal	komngol
‘tree’	ho	hi
‘skin’	ptaik	ptek
‘hair’	ngiris	ngɨris
‘grass skirt’	nhep	nhek
‘blood’	ɨndiɨl	ɨriɨl
‘yam’	tou	sngu
‘coconut’	ksiɨ	ges
‘speech’	rere	rhek
‘shell money’	pek	kirpik
‘ground’	mmie	marhok
‘person’	mhel	mia
‘road’	ngaelaut	nghek

== Grammar ==
=== Verbs ===
	Free	Perfective Realis	Future Irrealis
1SG	dok	ko-~ku-	ngu-er(a)
2SG	yen	i-	ngi-er(a)
3SG	ëën	t-	n-er(a)
1PL	mor	ngo-t-	ngur-er(a)
2PL	muk	mu-tu	mug-er(a)
3PL	mar	nga-t-	ng-er(a)
1DU	muo	mo-t-	mu-er(a)
2DU	moe	më-t-	më-er(a)
3DU	men	men-t-ngen-t	ngen-er(a)

Basic verb phrases are similar to Oceanic languages. For a typical Austronesian sentence structure, it follows the subject-verb-object word order whereas Papuan follows a subject-object-verb word order. Free pronouns mainly act as verbal or prepositional object. Instead of having the bilabial nasal found on the free pronouns, first and third person plural have an initial velar. Additionally, the basic verb phrase begins with a subject proclitic indicating both subject person/number and aspect/mood. This is followed by one or more verbs, a (pro)nominal object where necessary, and optional oblique constituents.

Kua pater yen orom o Sulka nga re.
Ku-a pat-er yen orom o Sulka nga re
1SG-IPFV think-TR 2SG with PL Sulka 3SG.POSS talk
"I am teaching you the Sulka language"

According to Reesink (2005), the most common future form he recorded was the same one identified previously. He cites this work by Schneider (1942:323) where this form was named a separate modal particle er(a).

Ngiera vokong a ho lang to nera hurpis.
Ngi=er=a vokong a ho lang to n=er=a hur-pis
2SG.IRR-FUT-IPFV see SG tree certain that 3SG.IRR-FUT-IPFV appear-arrive
"You will see a certain tree sprouting."

Habitual aspect and conditional mood utilize the same forms as the irrealis, both for 1SG and 2SG. In contrast, all of the other forms have more in common with the future pronouns because they also lack 3SG -t. Below, see examples of the habitual and the conditional, respectively:

Koma vle ma Mlavui kun mnam a rengmat to e Guma.
Ko=ma vle ma Mlavui kun mnam a rengmat to e Guma
1SG=HAB=IPFV stay LOC Mlavui inside inside SG village that ART Guma
"I am staying at Mlavui inside the village Guma."

Kopa ya va kopa ngae.
Ko=pa=a ya va Ko=p=a ngae
1SG=COND=IPFV good and 1SG=COND=IPFV go
"If I had been well, I would have gone."

=== Grammatical gender ===
Most Papuan languages have masculine and feminine distinctions. However, the Sulka language does not follow this rule. As for the Austronesian languages, where they have inclusive and exclusive opposition in nonsingular first person, Sulka does not follow them either (Sulka of East New Britain: A Mixture of Oceanic and Papuan Traits, Reesink, 2005). As stated by Reesink, "There is not even a third person differentiation between feminine and masculine genders".

== Papuan vs Austronesian ==
	Austronesian	Papuan
Word order	SVO and prepositions	
Phonology	Phonemic inventory resembles Mengen phonemic contrast [l] and [r]	Resembles Kol, (almost) all consonants occur word-finally many consonant clusters
Lexicon		Lacks typical AN lexicon
Verb morphology	Mood: realis vs irrealis as portmanteau with subject proclitics sequential ka	
Valency changing devices		Transitivizing suffix no causative prefix *pa(ka) no reciprocal *paRi stem change for object number
Pronominal system	Lacks gender on 3SG	Lacks INCL/EXCL on 1 NONSG
Nominal constituent	Prenominal articles/demonstratives	
Plural formation		Plural formation with irregular forms, some of which are possibly cognate with Kol, Kuot, and Lavukaleve
Adjectives	Attributive adjective=nominalized form	
Possessive constructions		Possessor is prefixed to possessed item no POSS suffix on inalienables
Counting system		Quinary (base-5) system
Deictic elements	Some cognates with Tolai	
Social organization	Moieties with clans resembling Mengen matrilineal	
