= Touo language =

Language native to the Solomon Islands

Coordinates: 8.58°S 157.30°E

Touo
- Baniata
- Native to: Solomon Islands
- Region: southern Rendova Island, Western Province
- Native speakers: (1,900 cited 1999 census)
- Language family: Central Solomons: Touo

Language codes
- ISO 639-3: tqu
- Glottolog: touo1238
- ELP: Touo
- Touo is not endangered according to the classification system of the UNESCO Atlas of the World's Languages in Danger

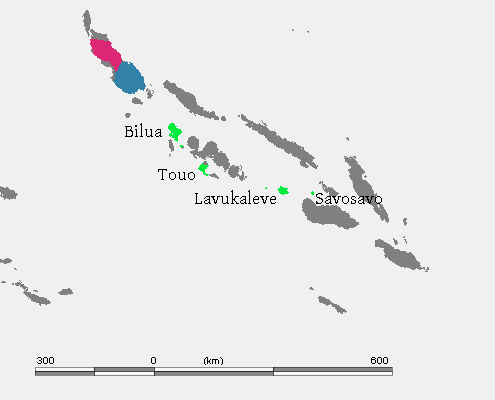
Language families of the Solomon Islands

The Touo language, also known as Baniata (Mbaniata) or Lokuru, is spoken over the southern part of Rendova Island, located in the Western Province of the Solomon Islands.

== Classification ==
Touo is generally seen to be a member of the tentative Central Solomons family, although Glottolog considers it an isolate. Pedrós (2015) cautiously suggests Lavukaleve as the closest relative to Touo. Most of the surrounding languages to Touo belong to the Oceanic subgroup of the Austronesian language family.

== Names ==
The Touo language is sometimes called the Baniata (Mbaniata) or Lokuru language, after the largest two villages where the language is spoken. The word Touo comes from the ethnonym that Touo speakers use to refer to themselves.

== Phonology ==
=== Consonants ===
Touo consonants are:

		Labial	Alveolar	Velar	Glottal
Nasal		m	n	ŋ	
Stop	voiceless	(p)	t	(k)	
Stop	voiced	b	d	ɡ ⟨q⟩	
Fricative	voiceless	f	s		h
Fricative	voiced	v	z		
Approximant			l	ɰ ⟨g⟩	

=== Vowels ===
Touo has six lax and five tense vowels.

Vowels
	Front		Back	
	Tense	Lax	Tense	Lax
High	ḭ ⟨ḭ⟩	i ⟨i⟩	ṵ ⟨ṵ⟩	u ⟨u⟩
Mid	ḛ ⟨ḛ⟩	e ⟨e⟩	o̰ ⟨o̰⟩	o ⟨o⟩
Low	a̰ ⟨a̰⟩	a ⟨a⟩		ɔ ⟨w⟩

Some minimal pairs showing the tense/lax vowel phonemic distinction in Touo:

Lax vs. Tense Vowels
Lax		Tense	
Orthography	Gloss	Orthography	Gloss
e	road	ḛ	oven
avo	garden	a̰vo	four
ua	who?	ṵa	eat
isi	small	ḭsi	sleep

== Grammar ==
Word order in Touo is SOV.

Touo has four genders.

- masculine
- feminine
- neuter I (generic)
- neuter II (certain trees)

Only in certain paradigms of the singular number can neuter I and II be distinguished.

Touo distinguishes four numbers.

- singular
- dual
- enumerated (i.e., numerically specified; can be used for both few or many numbers)
- non-enumerated (i.e., not numerically specified; used for numbers greater than three)

== See also ==
- Tetepare language

== Notes ==
- Paradisec has two collections of Arthur Cappell's materials (AC1, AC2) that include Touo language materials.
