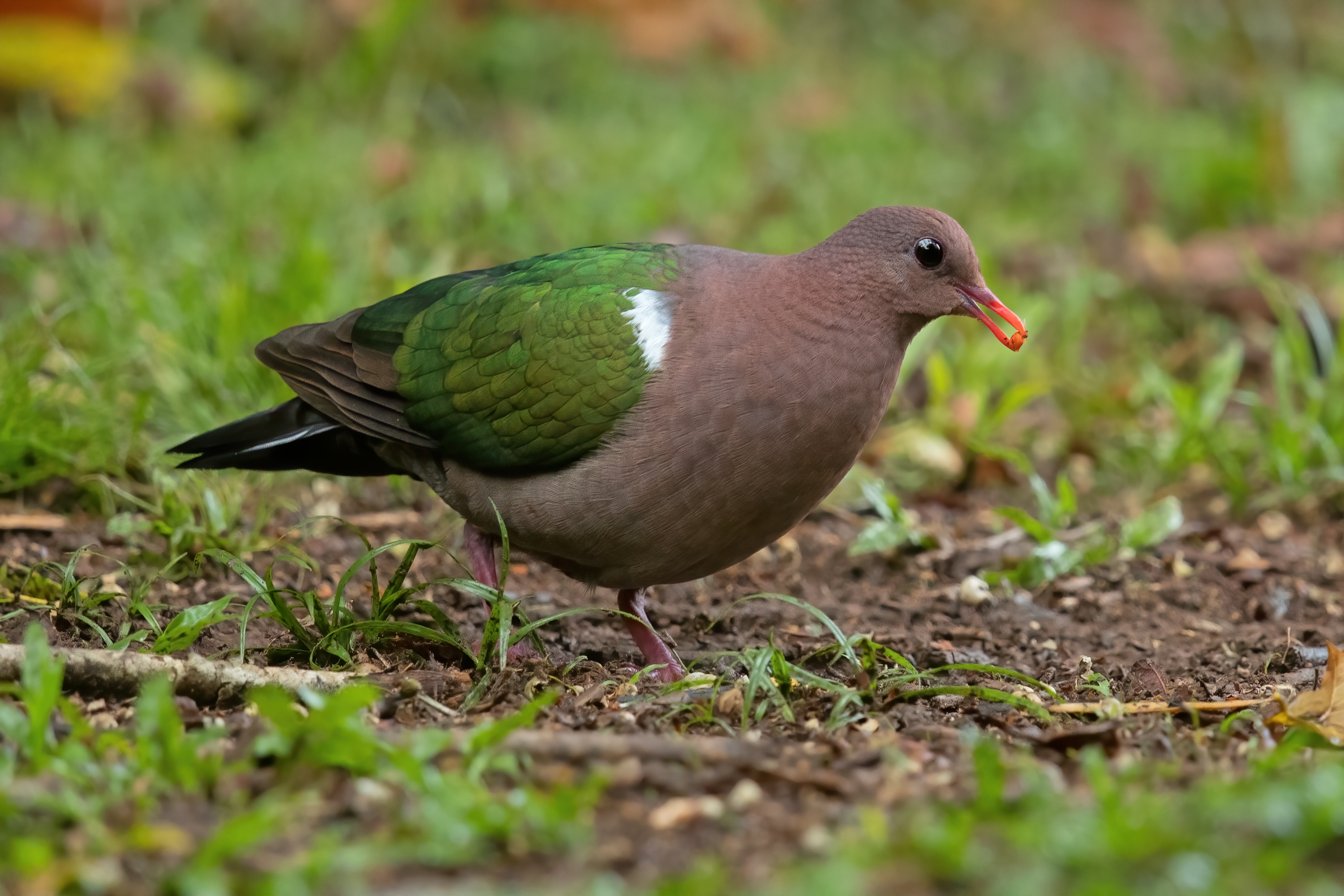

Conservation status
- Least Concern (IUCN 3.1)

Scientific classification
- Kingdom: Animalia
- Phylum: Chordata
- Class: Aves
- Order: Columbiformes
- Family: Columbidae
- Genus: Chalcophaps
- Species: C. longirostris

Binomial name
- Chalcophaps longirostris Gould, 1848

Subspecies
- See text

= Pacific emerald dove =

Species of bird

The Pacific emerald dove or brown-capped emerald dove (Chalcophaps longirostris) is a pigeon which is a widespread resident breeding bird in the tropical and sub-tropical parts of Indonesia, northern and eastern Australia, Timor-Leste, and Papua New Guinea. It was formerly conspecific with the common emerald dove.

== Description ==
This is a common species in rainforest and similar dense wet woodlands, farms, gardens, mangroves, and coastal heaths. It builds a scant stick nest in a tree up to five metres and lays two cream-coloured eggs. Breeding tends to occur in Australia in spring or early summer in southeastern Australia and late in the dry season in northern Australia.

Its flight is fast and direct, with the regular beats and an occasional sharp flick of the wings which are characteristic of pigeons in general. It often flies low between the patches of dense forest it prefers, but when disturbed will frequently walk away rather than fly. They are particularly good weavers when flying through forests. When flying they expose a buff underwing and a chestnut colour of their flight feathers.

The Pacific emerald dove is a stocky, medium-sized pigeon, typically 23 to 28 centimetres (9.1 to 11.0 inches) in length. The back and wings are bright emerald green. The flight feathers and tail are blackish, and broad black and white bars show on the lower back in flight. The head and underpants are dark vinous pink fading to greyish on the lower belly. The eyes are dark brown, the bill bright red, and the legs and feet rufous.

The male has a white patch on the edge of the shoulders and a grey crown, which the female lacks. Females will tend to have a browner complexion with a grey mark on the shoulder. Immature birds resemble females but have brown scallops on their bodies and wing plumage.

Pacific emerald doves usually occur singly, in pairs, or in small groups. They are quite terrestrial, often searching for fallen fruit on the ground and spending little time in trees except when roosting. They eat seeds and fruits of a wide variety of plants and are generally tame and approachable. Nevertheless, their tame behaviour does make them vulnerable to mesopredators such as feral cats, with the bird's largest predator being the cassowary that also inhabit the island of New Guinea and north-east Australia.

The call is a low soft moaning cooing consisting of about six to seven coos starting quietly and rising. They also call a nasal "hoo-hoo-hoon". Males perform a bobbing dance during courtship.

== Subspecies ==
The Pacific emerald dove has four sub-species:

- C. l. timorensis Bonaparte, 1856 - eastern Lesser Sundas
- C. l. longirostris Gould, 1848 - northern Australia
- C. l. rogersi Mathews, 1912 - eastern Australia, Lord Howe and Norfolk Islands, New Guinea
- C. l. sandwichensis Ramsay, 1878 - Santa Cruz and Banks Islands, Vanuatu, New Caledonia

A former subspecies, C. l. chrysochlora, has been discontinued and forms re-allocated to C. l. rogersi and C. l. timorensis.

== Gallery ==
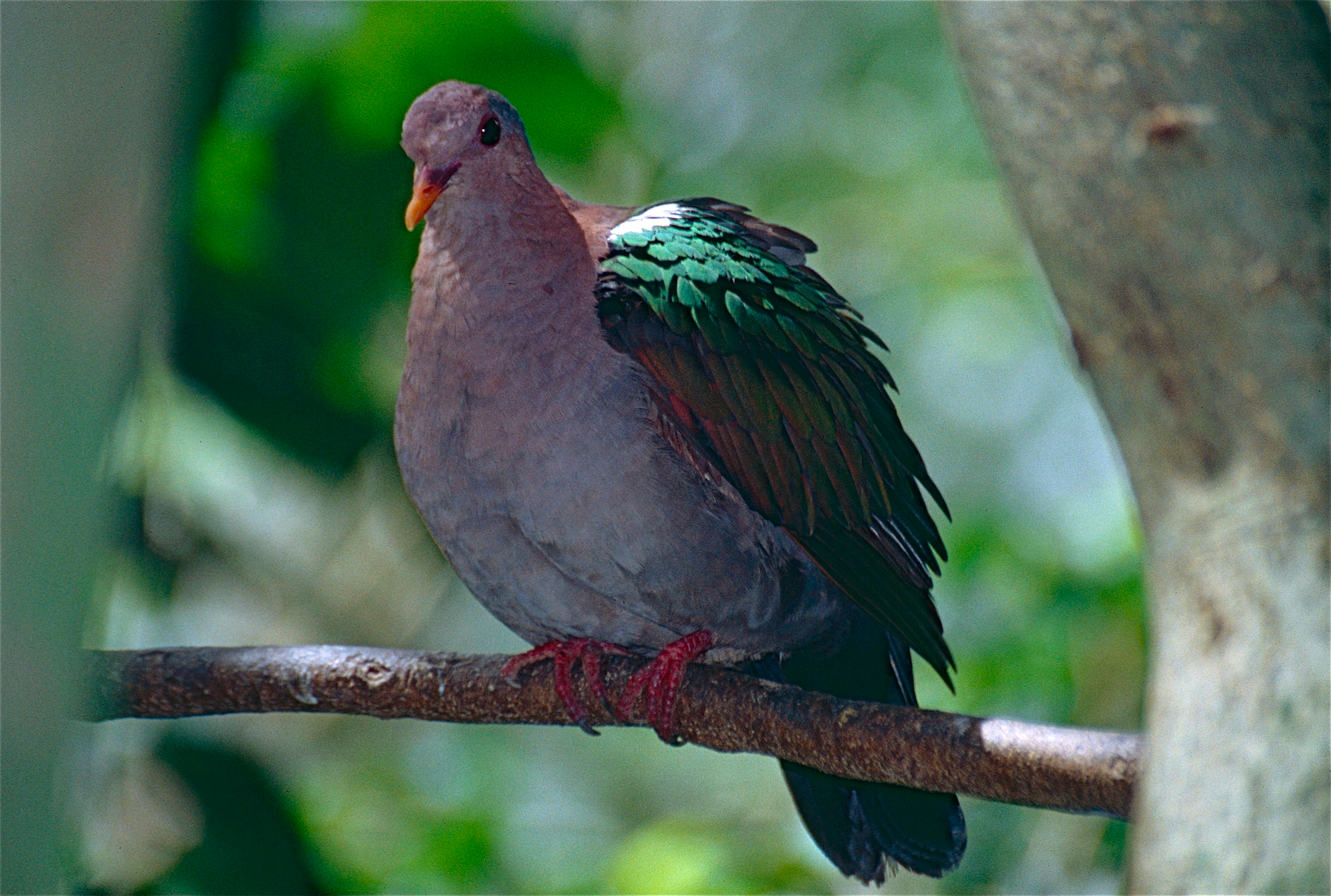
Male at Kuranda Birdworld

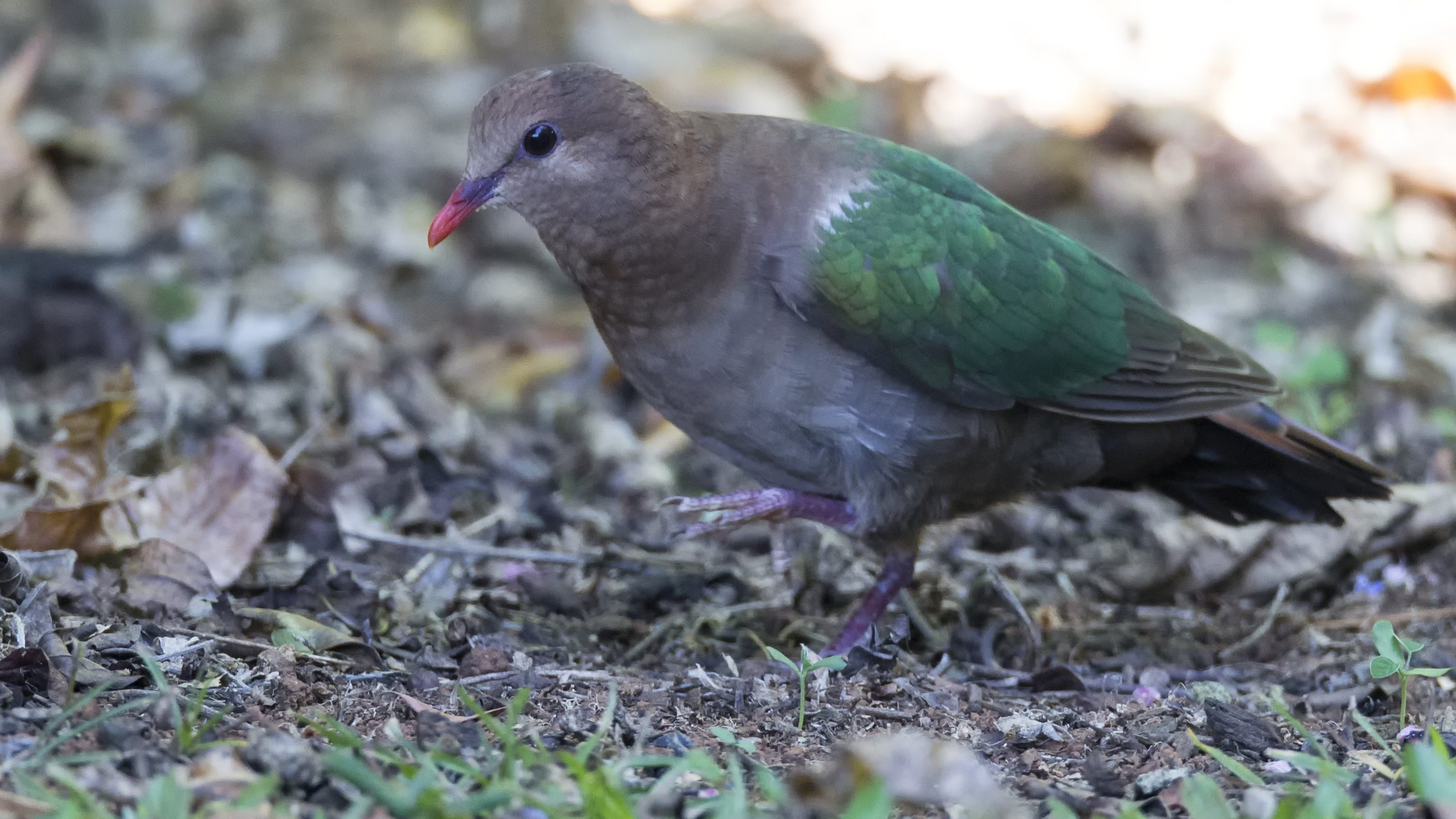
At Atherton Tableland, Queensland, Australia
