= Siwai Rural LLG =

Local-level government in Papua New Guinea

- Country: Papua New Guinea
- Province: Autonomous Region of Bougainville

Population (2011 census)
  - Total: 17,624
- Time zone: UTC+10 (AEST)

Siwai Rural LLG is a local-level government (LLG) of the Autonomous Region of Bougainville, Papua New Guinea. The Siwai language is spoken in the LLG.

== Wards ==
- 01. Mukakuru
- 02. Rataiku
- 03. Konga
- 04. Ruhwaku
- 05. Korikunu
- 06. Hari
- 07. Tokunutu
- 08.Motuna/Huyono
