= Sewai =

- Census Town
- Location in Jharkhand, India Sewai (India)
- Coordinates: 23.61°N 85.68°E
- Country: India
- State: Jharkhand
- District: Ramgarh

Population (2011)
  - Total: 7,874

Languages (*For language details see Chitarpur (community development block)#Language and religion)
  - Official: Hindi, Urdu
- Time zone: UTC+5:30 (IST)
- PIN: 825101
- Telephone/ STD code: 06553
- Vehicle registration: JH
- Lok Sabha constituency: Hazaribagh
- Vidhan Sabha constituency: Ramgarh
- Website: ramgarh.nic.in

Sewai is a census town in the Chitarpur (community development block) CD block in the Ramgarh subdivision of the Ramgarh district in the Indian state of Jharkhand.

== Geography ==
Cities, towns and locations in Ramgarh district in North Chotanagpur Division
M: municipality, CT: census town, R: rural/ urban centre, T: tourist centre, P: power plant
Abbreviation used- TPP: thermal power project
Owing to space constraints in the small map, the actual locations in a larger map may vary slightly

=== Location ===
Sewai is located at 23.61°N 85.68°E.

=== Area overview ===
Ramgarh has a vibrant coal-mining sector. The map alongside provides links to five operational areas of Central Coalfields spread across South Karanpura Coalfield, Ramgarh Coalfield and West Bokaro Coalfield. Four of the six CD blocks in the district have coal mines – Patratu, Ramgarh, Mandu and Chitarpur. The high concentration of census towns in these blocks are noticeable on the map. Only two blocks, Gola and Dulmi, are totally rural areas. Ramgarh district lies in the central part of the Chota Nagpur Plateau. The Damodar valley covers most of the district. The forested areas in highlands to the north and the south of the valley can be seen in the map (mark the shaded areas). "Chotanagpur has a charm of its own... The entire area forms one of the most charming series of views imaginable. The far-off hills in the background in exquisite tints of blue or purple as the light falls, the nearer hills picturesquely shaped and luxuriant in every shade of green with their bold escarpments in black or grey, and the brown plains below furnishing their quota of colours."

Note: The map alongside presents some of the notable locations in the district. All places marked in the map are linked in the larger full screen map.

== Demographics ==
According to the 2011 Census of India, Sewai had a total population of 7,874, of which 4,175 (53%) were males and 3,699 (47%) were females. Population in the age range 0-6 years was 660. The total number of literate persons in Sewai was 6,651 (92.20% of the population over 6 years).

As of 2001 India census, Sewai had a population of 8,784. Males constitute 53% of the population and females 47%. Sewai has an average literacy rate of 76%, higher than the national average of 59.5%: male literacy is 82%, and female literacy is 68%. In Sewai, 14% of the population is under 6 years of age.

== Infrastructure ==
According to the District Census Handbook 2011, Ramgarh, Sewai covered an area of 3.986 km^{2}. Among the civic amenities, it had 50 km roads with open drains, the protected watersupply involved tapwater from treated and untreated sources, overhead tank. It had 1,463 domestic electric connections, 200 road lighting points. Among the medical facilities, it had 1 hospital, 1 dispensary, 1 health centre, 9 family welfare centres, 1 maternity and child welfare centre, 1 maternity home, 7 nursing homes, 5 medicine shops. Among the educational facilities it had 12 primary schools, 3 middle schools, 1 secondary school, 1 senior secondary school, the nearest general degree college at Ramgarh Cantonment 12 km away. One important commodity it produced was coal. It had the branch offices of 3 nationalised banks, 1 cooperative bank, 1 agricultural credit society, 1 non-agricultural credit society.

== Economy ==
Rajrappa open cast mine and Rajrappa washery are operational under Rajrappa Area of Central Coalfields Limited.

== Education ==
- Saraswati Vidyamandir Rajrappa is a Hindi-medium Higher Secondary School located at Sewai.
- UPG High School Rajrappa Project is a Hindi-medium Secondary School at Sewai.

== Healthcare ==
Central Coalfields Limited has the Silver Jubilee Hospital Rajrappa mines at Sewai with 20 beds and 3 general duty medical officers. Among the facilities it has are: x-ray, laboratory. It has 2 ambulances.
