= Uisai language =

South Bougainville language

Uisai
- Region: Bougainville
- Native speakers: (2,500 cited 1991)
- Language family: South Bougainville: Buinic; Buin; Uisai

Language codes
- ISO 639-3: uis
- Glottolog: uisa1238
- ELP: Uisai

Uisai is a South Bougainville language of Bougainville Province, Papua New Guinea. It is in the Buin language subfamily. The language uses Latin script.
