= Simeku language =

South Bougainville language of Papua New Guinea

Simeku
- Native to: Papua New Guinea
- Region: Bougainville Province
- Native speakers: 3,000 (2007)
- Language family: South Bougainville: Nasioiic; Nasioi; Simekuic; Simeku
- Dialects: Mainoki; Koopei

Language codes
- ISO 639-3: smz
- Glottolog: sime1242

Simeku is a South Bougainville language spoken in the mountains of southern Bougainville Province, Papua New Guinea.
