= Ounge language =

South Bougainville language

Oune
- Ounge
- Native to: Papua New Guinea
- Region: Bougainville Province
- Native speakers: 1,000 (2007)
- Language family: South Bougainville: Nasioiic; Nasioi; South–Central Nasioi; Central Nasioi; Oune

Language codes
- ISO 639-3: oue
- Glottolog: oung1239

Oune (Ounge) is a South Bougainville language spoken in the mountains of southern Bougainville Province, Papua New Guinea.
