= Central Solomon languages =

Language family of Solomon Islands

Central Solomons
- (tentative)
- Geographic distribution: Solomon Islands
- Linguistic classification: One of the world's primary language families
- Proto-language: Proto-Central Solomons
- Subdivisions: Bilua; Touo; Lavukaleve; Savosavo

Language codes
- Glottolog: None
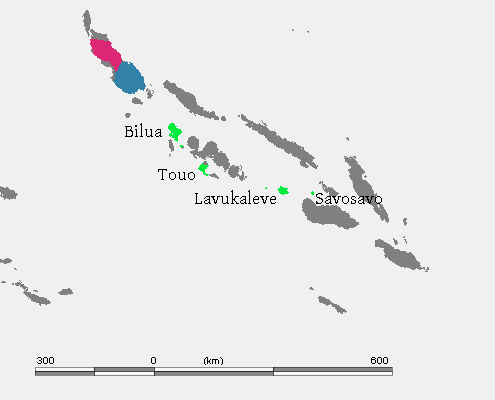
- Language families of the Solomon Islands. Central Solomons

The Central Solomon languages are the four Papuan languages spoken in the state of Solomon Islands.

The four languages are, listed from northwest to southeast,

- Bilua of Vella Lavella and Ghizo islands,
- Touo (also known as Baniata) of Rendova Island,
- Lavukaleve of the Russell Islands, and
- Savosavo of Savo Island.

== Classification ==
The four Central Solomon languages were identified as a family by Wilhelm Schmidt in 1908. The languages are at best distantly related, and evidence for their relationship is meager. Dunn and Terrill (2012) argue that the lexical evidence vanishes when Oceanic loanwords are excluded. Ross (2005) and Pedrós (2015), however, accept a connection, based on similarities among pronouns and other grammatical forms.

Pedrós (2015) suggests, tentatively, that the branching of the family is as follows.

Central Solomons

- Lavukaleve–Touo
- Savosavo–Bilua

Savosavo and Bilua, despite being the most distant languages geographically, both split more recently than Lavukaleve and Touo according to Pedrós.

Palmer (2018) regards the evidence for Central Solomons as tentative but promising.

An automated computational analysis (ASJP 4) by Müller et al. (2013) grouped Touo, Savosavo, and Bilua together. Lavukaleve was not included. However, since the analysis was automatically generated, the grouping could be either due to mutual lexical borrowing or genetic inheritance.

== Pronoun reconstructions ==
Pedrós (2015) argues for the existence of the family through comparison of pronouns and other gender, person and number morphemes and based on the existence of a common syncretism between 2nd person nonsingular and inclusive. He performs an internal reconstruction for the pronominal morphemes of each language and then proposes a reconstruction of some of the pronouns of the claimed family. The reconstructions are the following:

	1 singular	2 singular	inclusive/ 2 non-singular	1 exclusive
Pre-Savosavo	*a-ɲi	*no	*me	a-
Pre-Touo	e̤	noe	*me	e̤-
Pre-Lavukaleve	*ŋai	*ŋo	*me	e
Pre-Bilua	*ani/*aŋai	*ŋo	me	e-
Proto-Central Solomons	*ani/*aŋai	*ŋo	*me	*e

== Numerals ==
Central Solomon numerals from Pedrós (2015):

numeral	Savosavo	Touo	Lavukaleve	Bilua
1	ˈela, ˈpade / pa	aɺo / azo	ˈtelakom, ˈtelako	ˈomadeu, ˈmadeu
2	ˈedo	e̤ɺi	ˈlelemal, ˈlelaol, ˈlelaɰel, ˈlemal	ˈomuga, ˈmuga
3	iˈɰiβa / iˈɰia	hie	ˈeŋa	ˈzouke, ke
4	ˈaɰaβa	a̤vo	nun	ˈariku
5	ˈara	sodu	ˈsie	ˈsike, ke

As the comparisons indicate, lexical evidence for the relatedness of the four languages is limited.

== Vocabulary comparison ==
The following basic vocabulary words are from Tryon & Hackman (1982), as cited in the Trans-New Guinea database. The Savosavo data is from Claudia Wegener's field notes.

The words cited constitute translation equivalents, with no claim as to whether they are cognate or not. If one sets apart the obvious loanwords from Oceanic languages (e.g. batu, vatu for “head”, susu for “breast”), the number of potential cognates across these four varieties is evidently very low.

gloss	Lavukaleve	Mbaniata (Lokuru dial.)	Mbilua (Ndovele dial.)	Savosavo
head	vatu	uɔ	lezu	batu
hair	memea	zufu	tou	luta; sivuɰa
ear	hovul	ōŋgoto	taliŋa	tagalu
eye	lemi	mberɔ	vilu	nito
nose	sisi	emɔ	ŋgame	ɲoko
tooth	neo	nāne	taka	nale
tongue	let	ānl	leño	lapi
leg	tau furime	ɔe	kiti	
louse	kea; lai	lisa; vutu	sipi; tiŋgau	dole
dog	mitakeu	sie	siele	misu
bird	malaɣul	mānozo	mbiaŋambiaŋa	kosu
egg	keruv	āndena	tɔruru	kolei; si
blood	ravu	vo	ndara	ɰabu
bone	sosokio	minu	piza	tovolo
skin	keut	zuɔna	tupu	korakora
breast	ɔfu	susu	susu	susu
man	ali	finɔzɔ	mamba	tada
woman	aira	ŋgohe	reko	adaki
sky	totoās	uzia	au	oka
moon	kua	īndi	kamboso	kuɰe
water	lafi	fiɔ	nĵu	piva
fire	lake	hirɔ	uza	keda
stone	mbeko; veko	hɛŋga	lando	kato
road, path	lake	e	keve	keva
name	laŋi	nini	ŋi	nini
eat	eu; eui; oune	azafe	vuato	l-ou; samu
one	dom; tetelom	āroŋo; thufi	mandeu	ela; pade
two	lelal; lemal	ēri	omuŋga	edo

== Syntax ==
All Central Solomon languages have SOV word order except for Bilua, which has SVO word order due to Oceanic influence.

== Links and references ==
=== See also ===
- Papuan languages
- Temotu languages, Oceanic but with heavy Papuan substrate influence
  - Reefs-Santa Cruz languages

=== Bibliography ===
- Dunn, Michael, Angela Terrill, Ger Reesink, Robert A. Foley, Stephen C. Levinson, 2005. Structural Phylogenetics and the Reconstruction of Ancient Language History. Science magazine, 23 Sept. 2005, vol. 309, p 2072.
- Greenhill, Simon J. & Robert Forkel. (2019). lexibank/tryonsolomon: Solomon Islands Languages (Version v3.0) [Data set]. Zenodo. doi:10.5281/zenodo.3535809
- Pedrós, Toni, 2015. "New arguments for a Central Solomons family based on evidence from pronominal morphemes". Oceanic Linguistics, vol. 54, no. 2 (358-395).
- Ross, Malcolm, 2001. "Is there an East Papuan phylum? Evidence from pronouns", in The boy from Bundaberg. Studies in Melanesian linguistics in honour of Tom Dutton, ed. by Andrew Pawley, Malcolm Ross and Darrell Tryon: 301-322. Canberra: Pacific Linguistics.
- Ross, Malcolm, 2005. "Pronouns as a preliminary diagnostic for grouping Papuan languages", in Papuan pasts: cultural, linguistic and biological histories of Papuan speaking peoples, ed. by Andrew Pawley, Robert Attenborough, Robin Hide and Jack Golson: 15-65. Canberra: Pacific Linguistics.

=== External links ===
- Central Solomons languages database at TransNewGuinea.org
- Central Solomons word lists (Austronesian Basic Vocabulary Database)
