= Bilua language =

Papuan language spoken in Solomon Islands

Coordinates: 7.92°S 156.66°E

Bilua
- Native to: Solomon Islands
- Region: Vella Lavella Island, Western Province
- Native speakers: (8,700 cited 1999)
- Language family: Central Solomon: Bilua

Language codes
- ISO 639-3: blb
- Glottolog: bilu1245
- ELP: Bilua
- Bilua is not endangered according to the classification system of the UNESCO Atlas of the World's Languages in Danger

Bilua (also known as Mbilua or Vella Lavella) is the most populous Papuan language spoken in the Solomon Islands. It is a Central Solomon language spoken by about 9,000 people on the island of Vella Lavella. It is one of the four Papuan non-Austronesian languages spoken in the Solomon Islands.

== Classification ==
"Bilua is sometimes grouped with the other Central Solomons languages and beyond (Wurm 1975b) but closer inspection shows that a genealogical relation is not demonstrable (Dunn and Terrill 2012, Terrill 2011)" (Hammarström, forthcoming).

== Phonology ==
The consonant and vowels sounds of Bilua.

=== Consonants ===
		Bilabial	Alveolar	Post- alveolar	Palatal	Velar
Nasal		m	n		ɲ	ŋ
Plosive/ Affricate	voiceless	p	t	(t͡ʃ)		k
Plosive/ Affricate	voiced	b (ᵐb)	d (ⁿd)	d͡ʒ (ⁿd͡ʒ)		g (ᵑɡ)
Fricative	voiceless		s			
Fricative	voiced	β	z			(w)
Lateral			l			
Rhotic			r			

The voiced stops and affricate sounds /b d ɡ dʒ/ can occur as prenasalized allophones, when occurring intervocalically [ᵐb ⁿd ᵑɡ ⁿdʒ]. Other consonant allophones include [w tʃ] for /β dʒ/.

=== Vowels ===
	Front	Central	Back
High	i (ɪ)		u (ʊ)
Mid	e (ɛ)		o (ɔ)
Low		a	

Four vowel sounds /i u e o/ have allophones but only in diphthongs as [ɪ ɛ ɔ ʊ].

== Verb construction ==
=== Sample Verbs ===
English	Bilua
to bite	nanae, nanaelɔu
to blow	pueka, puzeka, puzeko
to breathe	kozato
to burn	siŋgae, siŋgato
to come	kua
to count	ataito, atiato
to cry	ziaʔo, zialo
to cut, hack	kombue, kombuto, paŋgoe, paŋgoilo, rupe
to die, be dead	vou
to dig	telite, telito
to drink	nozutɔ, nĵuvuatɔ, sapɔ
to eat	ɔkua, vuato
to fall	pialo
to fear	ŋalo
to flow	rundundu
to fly	akazo, salosalo, sindiki
to hear	viŋgo
to hit	pazɔvɔ, pazoto, pazovo
to hold	kamaka, kamako
to hunt	zaulao, zaulau
to kill	vouvaiva, vouvato
to know, be knowledgeable	ñaño
to laugh	kisiko, nureo
to lie down	teku
to live, be alive	saevo, saivo
to say	kaseka, kiŋɔla, pesio
to scratch	kirikirito, pirakasa
to see	alea, kea, kelo
to sew	turue, turuto
to sit	papi, papu
to sleep	maroŋa, maroŋo
to sniff, smell	tuiño, tuimikɔ, tuimiko
to spit	supato
to split	reseilo, seseto
to squeeze	zuzuto, žužue
to stab, pierce	nĵokuto, zatae
to stand	lonĵo
to steal	kuilɔ, kuilo
to suck	kuzukuzuto, kuzutɔ
to swell	tumbu
to swim	lilitɔ, ruazo, siusiutɔ, siusiuto
to think	kɛrukɛruto, kerukeruto
to tie up	lupika
to turn	lilite, vipulɔ
to walk	ɔla, ola, saŋgɔre, tali, talio, zakei
to vomit	sakoezo
to work	irurupoto, iruruputo

== Noun classification ==
Bilua has a masculine-feminine gender system with no neuter nouns. Truly males are always male and truly female are always female.
