= Koromira language =

South Bougainville language of Bougainville Province

Koromira
- Native to: Papua New Guinea
- Region: Bougainville Province
- Native speakers: 2,500 (2007)
- Language family: South Bougainville: Nasioiic; Nasioi; South–Central Nasioi; South Nasioi; Koromira

Language codes
- ISO 639-3: kqj
- Glottolog: koro1313

Koromira is a South Bougainville language spoken in the mountains of southern Bougainville Province, Papua New Guinea.
