= Naasioi language =

Language spoken in Papua New Guinea

Naasioi
- Native to: Papua New Guinea
- Region: Kieta District, Bougainville Province
- Native speakers: 20,000 (2007)
- Language family: South Bougainville: Nasioiic; Nasioi; South–Central Nasioi; Central Nasioi; Naasioi
- Writing system: Latin script Otomaung script

Language codes
- ISO 639-3: nas
- Glottolog: naas1242

Naasioi (also Nasioi, Kieta, Kieta Talk, Aunge) is an East Papuan language spoken in the central mountains and southeast coast of Kieta District, Bougainville Province, Papua New Guinea.

== Phonology ==
=== Vowels ===
	Front	Back
High	i iː	u uː
Mid	e eː	o oː
Low	a aː	

=== Consonants ===
		Bilabial	Coronal	Velar	Glottal
Stop	voiceless	p	t	k	ʔ
Stop	voiced	b	d		
Nasal		m	n	(ŋ)	

Nasals can be syllabic.
