= Daantanaiʼ language =

Nasioi language spoken in Papua New Guinea

Lantanai
- Daantanaiʼ
- Pronunciation: [daːntanaiʔ]
- Native to: Papua New Guinea
- Region: Bougainville Province
- Native speakers: 600 (2007)
- Language family: South Bougainville: Nasioiic; Nasioi; South–Central Nasioi; South Nasioi; Lantanai

Language codes
- ISO 639-3: lni
- Glottolog: daan1235

Lantanai (Daantanaiʼ) is an East Papuan language spoken in the mountains of southern Bougainville Province, Papua New Guinea. It is spoken in Piruneuʼ and Warana villages.
