= Lavukaleve language =

Language of the Solomon Islands

Lavukaleve
- Native to: Solomon Islands
- Region: Russell Islands
- Native speakers: (1,800 cited 1999)
- Language family: Central Solomons ?: Lavukaleve

Language codes
- ISO 639-3: lvk
- Glottolog: lavu1241
- ELP: Lavukaleve
- Lavukaleve is not endangered according to the classification system of the UNESCO Atlas of the World's Languages in Danger

Lavukaleve is one of the four Central Solomons languages of the Solomon Islands. It is thus assumed to be the descendant of the languages spoken in the Solomon Islands before the spread of the much more numerous Austronesian languages. The name Lavukaleve derives from the ethnonym Lavukal. The Lavukals are the Indigenous peoples of the Russell Islands, part of the Solomon Islands Central Province. A comprehensive grammatical description of Lavukaleve was published by the linguist Angela Terrill in 2003.

Lavukaleve is spoken in about eleven main villages. It used to be spoken predominantly on Pavuvu, the largest island, but the speakers were forcefully relocated by the British to the smaller islands in order to make way for plantations.

== Phonology ==
=== Consonants ===
		Labial	Alveolar	Velar	Glottal
Nasal		m	n	ŋ	
Plosive	voiceless	(p)	t	k	
Plosive	voiced	b ~ ᵐb	d ~ ⁿd		
Fricative		f	s		h
Rhotic			r		
Lateral			l		
Semivowel		β̞		ɰ	

- Sounds /b, d/ are prenasalized [ᵐb, ⁿd] in intervocalic positions.
- [p] only occurs in loanwords from Pijin.
- /t, k/ can also be heard as aspirated [tʰ, kʰ] in free variation.
- /r/ can also be heard as a tap [ɾ] or glide [ɹ] in free variation.

=== Vowels ===
	Front	Central	Back
Close	i		u
Mid	e		o
Open		a	

- Vowels /i, o/ can be heard as [ɪ, ɔ] when in unstressed syllables.

== See also ==
- East Papuan languages
