= Motuna language =

Papuan language spoken in Papua New Guinea

Motuna
- Siwai, Siuai
- Motuna
- Region: Bougainville
- Native speakers: (7,000 cited 1970)
- Language family: South Bougainville: Buinic; Motuna
- Dialects: Baitsi (Sigisigero); Mokuta; Pouko

Language codes
- ISO 639-3: siw
- Glottolog: siwa1245

Motuna, or Siwai, is a Papuan language of Bougainville Province, Papua New Guinea. It is spoken primarily in Siwai Rural LLG. The current number of speakers is difficult to estimate since the latest figure (6,000 + 600) is from the 1970 census.

== Phonology ==
=== Vowels ===
	Front	Back
Close	i	u
Mid	e	o
Low		a

=== Consonants ===
	Bilabial	Alveolar	Palatal	Velar	Glottal
Nasal	m [m]	n [n]		ng [ŋ]	
Stop	p [p]	t [t]		k [k]	
Fricative		s [s]			h [h]
Rhotic		r [ɾ]			
Glide	w [w]		y [j]		

The structure of the language is CV(C), with the coda being an archiphoneme realized as a glottal stop, glottal fricative, or a nasal (homorganic to the next consonant or velar if word-final).

== Grammar ==
Siwai is an agglutinating language that undergoes a substantial amount of morphophonological fusion. Heads and dependents are both marked. It shows case on NPs. It is ergative/absolutive. It shows extremely complex prefixation and suffixation in verbs, kinship terms, classifiers, and numerals. It tends to be verb-final, with A and O in either order. NPs can be omitted when understood from context.

=== Gender ===
Siwai exhibits five genders: masculine, feminine, diminutive, local, and manner. These are marked in the singular forms only since dual and paucal forms are all marked like diminutive and plurals are marked like masculine. These genders coexist with fifty-one semantic types, marked by classifiers. These in turn are combined with numerals, demonstratives, and possessive pronouns.

=== Number ===
The language has four numbers: singular, dual, paucal, and plural. Nouns show all four while pronouns are either singular and non-singular. First-person non-singular shows a distinction in inclusive and exclusive.

=== Verbs ===
Verbs mark person and number of core arguments. It has split S morphology and active/middle voice distinction. Verbs also mark one of fourteen TAM categories.

==== Structure ====
The verb structure consists primarily of suffixes:

(i) verb stem
(ii) bound pronominal morphemes, cross-referencing the person and number of core argument(s)
(iii) a TAM suffix
(iv) non-medial verbs that are fully inflected cross-reference the gender of the topical argument.
(iv′) other non-medial verbs and same-subject medial verbs mark nothing else
(iv″) different-subject medial verbs have a form indicating both aspect and switch-reference.

There are some verbs that are exceptions to this structure, such as the Definite Future suffix which requires no gender marking, and some TAM morphemes in medial verbs.

==== Valency ====
Siwai has four types of valency structure:

(a) plain transitives take A and O
(b) extended transitives take A, O, and E
(c) plain intransitives take S
(d) extended intransitives take S and E

Some verbs are ambitransitive and take either active or middle voice. The voice system of the language is thus a "verbal diathesis" where the configuration of core arguments determine the active or middle voice.

==== Classes ====
There are five main verb classes, which are determined by which cross-referencing morphemes they take:

(1) S_{a} verbs
(2) S_{a} verbs
(3) Irregular verbs ('be, exist', 'go', 'come', 'die', 'cry')
(4) Ambitransitive (active-middle) verbs

(a) 'reflexive action' (S=O=A)
(b) 'spontaneous process/event' (S=O)
(c) 'less agentive activity' (S=A)

(5) Middle-only verbs

(a) 'bodily action'
(b) 'spontaneous process/event'
(c) 'complex activity'

=== Syntax ===
Similar to many other Papuan languages, Siwai has medial verbs which are in the middle of a sentence and indicate TAM and switch-reference.
