= Terei language =

Papuan language of eastern New Guinea

Terei
- Buin
- Region: Bougainville
- Native speakers: 27,000 (2003)
- Language family: South Bougainville: Buinic; Buin; Terei

Language codes
- ISO 639-3: buo
- Glottolog: tere1278

Terei or Buin, also known as Telei, Rugara, is the most populous Papuan language spoken to the east of New Guinea. There are about 27,000 speakers in the Buin District of Bougainville Province, Papua New Guinea.

== Phonology ==
The phonology of the Buin language:

Consonant sounds
	Labial	Alveolar	Velar
Plosive	p	t	k g
Nasal	m	n	ŋ
Liquid		ɾ (l)	

The /ɡ/ sound does not occur word-initially and is often fricativised as [ɣ]. The phoneme /ɾ/ following an /n/ is pronounced as [d], and also occurs as [l] for an allophonic variant. When a /t/ sound occurs before an /i/, it is always pronounced as [tsi], and when occurring before a /u/ or /a/, it may be realized as [tsu] or [tsa] depending on the dialect.

Vowel sounds
	Front	Back
High	i	u
Mid	e	o
Low	a	
