= Nagovisi language =

South Bougainville language of Papua New Guinea

Nagovisi
- Sibe
- Native to: Papua New Guinea
- Region: Bougainville Province
- Native speakers: 12,000 (2018)
- Language family: South Bougainville: Nasioiic; Nagovisi
- Writing system: Latin script

Language codes
- ISO 639-3: nco
- Glottolog: sibe1248
- ELP: Sibe

Nagovisi, or Sibe, is a South Bougainville language spoken in the mountains of southern Bougainville Province, Papua New Guinea.

== Morphology ==
Nagovisi makes use of noun class suffixes, which are:

Noun class suffix	Noun class semantics	Example (with demonstrative a-)	Gloss of example
-bore	round things, including balls, coins, coconuts, fruit, betelnut, cooking pots, garamut drums	moo a-bore-ka'	‘that coconut’
-mai	dogs, cats, horses, knives, forks, spoons, axes and other tools	moska a-mai-ka'	‘that dog’
-möö	people, birds, fish, small animals, insects, reptiles	kokoree' a-möö-ka'	‘that chicken’
-visi	houses, buildings, canoes, ships, cars	pawa a-visi-ga'	‘that house’
-woro'	pigs, cows	pooro' a-woro-ka'	‘that pig’
