= 2000 Banggai Islands earthquake =

Earthquake in Indonesia

- Location within Sulawesi Location within Indonesia
- UTC time: 2000-05-04 04:21:16
- ISC event: 1836975
- USGS-ANSS: ComCat
- Local date: 4 May 2000
- Local time: 12:21:16 WITA (UTC+8)
- Duration: 30 seconds
- Magnitude: 7.5 M_{w}
- Depth: 30 km (19 mi)
- Epicenter: 1.310°S 123.470°E
- Type: Strike-slip
- Max. intensity: MMI VII (Very strong)
- Tsunami: 6 m (20 ft)
- Aftershocks: 84 (as of 31/12/2000); Strongest: M_{wc} 5.7 on 5 May
- Casualties: 54 fatalities, 270 injuries

On 4 May 2000 at 12:21 WITA (04:21 UTC), a M_{w} 7.5 earthquake struck off the coast of Banggai Islands Regency, Central Sulawesi, Indonesia, which was followed by a damaging local tsunami. The earthquake and tsunami killed at least 54 people and injured 270 others, with most of the damage and casualties occurring in the Banggai Islands.

== Tectonic setting ==
The Banggai region of Sulawesi lies within the complex area of interaction between the Pacific, Philippine Sea, Australian and Eurasian plates. The Banggai Islands themselves form part of the Banggai-Sula microcontinent, which collided with eastern Sulawesi during the Neogene, with a thrust fault boundary along the southeastern edge of the Eastern arm. The northern margin of the Banggai-Sula block has been interpreted as a continuous southward moving thrust zone, but seismic reflection data and high-resolution multibeam bathymetry show little sign of thrusting, with evidence instead of a zone of dextral strike-slip faulting.

== Earthquake ==
The earthquake had an initial estimated magnitude of 7.6 M_{w}, 7.5 M_{s}, 6.7 mb and a recalculated magnitude of 7.5 M_{w}. By 31 December 2000, 84 aftershocks exceeding M_{w} 4.0 were detected by the USGS, with the strongest one measuring M_{wc} 5.7 and occurring on 5 May. These aftershocks mainly occurred south and southwest of the epicenter, with many having epicenters located directly beneath the islands of Peleng and Banggai, unlike the offshore mainshock.

The focal mechanism is consistent with strike-slip faulting on either a northwest-southeast trending sinistral (left-lateral) fault or a southwest-northeast trending dextral (right-lateral) fault. A rupture area of 220 km (140 mi) x 13 km (8.1 mi) was estimated, extending from Bangkulu Island to the Molucca Sea near the Gulf of Tomini, with a maximum slip of 4.83 m (15.8 ft) near the hypocenter. The observed source time function gives a 30 second duration for the earthquake, with the greatest phase of seismic moment release occurring about five seconds after initiation.

=== Tsunami ===
The earthquake triggered a 6 m (20 ft) high tsunami which struck the Banggai Islands and Peleng. It completely inundated several villages, completely destroying all houses in a few of them. Multiple structures were also swept out to sea by the waves.

== Damage and casualties ==
At least 54 people were killed, including 41 in Banggai Islands Regency, four in Banggai Regency and one in Luwuk. There were also 270 injuries, of which 54 were serious. The earthquake and tsunami affected a total of 19,378 homes, 537 government buildings, 475 schools, 349 religious sites, 289 km (180 mi) of road, 43 health centers, 43 bridges and two markets. The earthquake also left an estimated 170,000 people homeless. Because of the remoteness of the area and the destruction of roads, damage assessments were difficult. An estimated 80% of buildings on Banggai Island collapsed in the earthquake, and 15 people died there. Damage also occurred in Peleng, and in Luwuk, dozens of homes were damaged and a local market was destroyed by a fire.

== Response ==
The Indonesian government distributed 30 tons of rice, 300 kilograms of sugar, milk powder and instant noodles for the Banggai Islands. According to the Indonesia government, medical supplies are available to support for at least six months. Five tons of the rice was released by the Indonesian Red Cross (PMI) from its inventory with the national government logistics agency. The medicines donated to PMI by the Singapore Red Cross are divided into sections for health stations that provide free medical services to the population. The criteria for the selection of health posts are determined by the PMI, based on the most pressing needs of each post. The Ministry of Housing and Regional Development decided to assist the Banggai Islands by allocating 16 billion Indonesian rupiah (US$2.2 million) for the repair of housing and transport infrastructure. The Government of Japan sent a speed boat to provide emergency transport.

== See also ==
- List of earthquakes in 2000
- List of earthquakes in Indonesia
- 1968 Sulawesi earthquake
- 1998 North Maluku earthquake
- 2018 Sulawesi earthquake and tsunami
