= Arawa FA B-League =

- Country: Papua New Guinea
- Confederation: OFC
- Number of clubs: 6
- Level on pyramid: 3 (proposed)
- Promotion to: Bougainville Premier League
- Current champions: Poraka FC (3) (2026)
- Most championships: Panguna Metals (9)

The Arawa FA B-League is the proposed second tier of soccer in the Autonomous Region of Bougainville, and third in the Papua New Guinea. It is organized by the Arawa Football Association, a member of the Bougainville Football Federation, which is itself an affiliate of the Papua New Guinea Football Association. Founded in 2004, the Arawa Football Association celebrated its fifteenth anniversary coinciding with the 2019 Grand Final match played between Extreme FC and Poraka FC. The league has received significant funding from the Bougainville Copper and its parent company Rio Tinto.

== List of champions ==
Season	Champions	Ref.
2008	Panguna Metals	
2009	Panguna Metals	
2010	Panguna Metals	
2011	Panguna Metals	
2012	Panguna Metals	
2013	Panguna Metals	
2014	Panguna Metals	
2015	Panguna Metals	
2016	Poraka FC	
2017	Extreme FC	
2018	Panguna Metals	
2019	Extreme FC	
2020	Cancelled due to the COVID-19 pandemic	
2021	Cancelled due to the COVID-19 pandemic	
2022	Lavelai Extract	
2023	Extreme FC	
2024	Bougainville United FC	
2025	Poraka FC	
2026	Poraka FC	
