= 2000 Baku earthquake =

6.8 earthquake in Baku, Azerbaijan

- Location within Azerbaijan
- UTC time: 2000-11-25 18:09:11
- ISC event: 2770732
- USGS-ANSS: ComCat
- Local date: November 25, 2000
- Local time: 22:09:11 AZT (UTC+4)
- Magnitude: M_{w} 6.8
- Depth: 35.0 km (22 mi)
- Epicenter: 40.25°N 49.9°E
- Type: Reverse
- Areas affected: Baku and Sumgait, Azerbaijan
- Max. intensity: MMI VI (Strong)
- Aftershocks: 120 (as of 26/11/2000)
- Casualties: 35 fatalities, 600 injuries

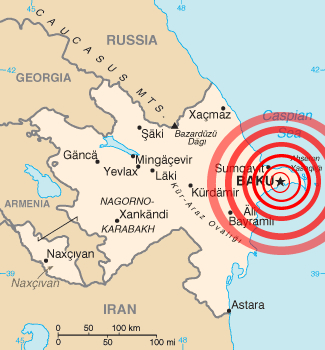
Map of 2000 Baku earthquake.

On 25 November 2000, at 22:09 (18:09 AZT), a M_{w} 6.8 earthquake struck with an epicenter just offshore Baku, Azerbaijan. It was followed a minute later by a M_{w} 6.5 event. The mainshock resulted in 35 mostly indirect fatalities and 600 injuries.

== Tectonic setting ==
Baku lies on the Absheron peninsula close to the northern edge of the broad and complex zone of deformation caused by the continuing collision between the Arabian plate and the Eurasian plate. There are two main active seismic zones on the Absheron peninsula. The northern zone is part of the North Caucasus thrust belt that continues to the east along the Apsheron Sill, which is interpreted to be a zone of active subduction. Earthquakes recorded in the northern zone are mainly deep reverse or shallow normal in type. The southern zone is interpreted to be a continuation of the Greater Caucasus thrust. Earthquakes in this area are mainly reverse or right lateral strike-slip in type.

== Earthquake ==
The earthquake consisted of two closely spaced events 90 seconds apart. The first event had an oblique reverse fault mechanism on a steeply-dipping fault trending northwest–southeast, while the second was pure reverse in type on a moderately-dipping reverse fault trending west-northwest–east-southeast. Within the uncertainties, the two events occurred at the same depth, at about 40 km. The United States Geological Survey (USGS) measured the first event at M_{wc} 6.8, and the second event at M_{w} 6.5. Shaking from the earthquake was felt as far away as the Republic of Dagestan in Russia, Garabogaz in Turkmenistan, Tbilisi in Georgia and northern Iran. The main event was the most powerful earthquake to strike Azerbaijan since 1852. By 26 November, over 120 aftershocks were recorded.

== Impact ==
More than 35 people were killed and 600 suffered injuries due to the earthquake, 30 of them seriously. Twenty-three deaths were attributed to earthquake-related heart attacks and three others were killed by a gas explosion. People were injured due to car accidents or jumping out windows. At least 804 buildings were seriously damaged, including 450 in the Baku-Sumgait area, with 5,761 more slightly damaged. Among them, the headquarters of the Azerbaijan Red Crescent Society, which was heavily damaged and evacuated. Over 90 apartment buildings, the Church of the Saviour, the Palace of the Shirvanshahs, the Azerbaijan State Academic Opera and Ballet Theater, the Taza Pir Mosque, the Ajdarbey Mosque, the Palace of Happiness and the Maiden's Tower in Sabail, near the Isa bek Hajinski House, were all seriously damaged.

== Aftermath ==
Following the presidential decree of November 28, 2000, the State Emergency Commission was provided with US$5.5 million in order to deal with the consequences of the earthquake. The SEC dispatched assessment teams to the affected areas. In Baku, as of November 27, 19 families were evacuated from three severely damaged houses and schools were temporarily closed. The United Nations Disaster Management Team, composed of UNDP, UNHCR, UNICEF, UNFPA, and WHO, was established in order to consider opportunities to support the governmental efforts. The IFRC launched an emergency appeal for international assistance amounting to US$590,000.

== See also ==
- List of earthquakes in 2000
- List of earthquakes in Azerbaijan
- 2000 Turkmenistan earthquake
