= Lloyd's Metals FC =

Lloyd's Metals
- Short name: LMFC
- Founded: 1998; 28 years ago
- Ground: Niniku Oval
- Manager: Freddie Piriri
- League: Arawa FA B-League
Home colours	Away colours

Lloyd's Metals FC, or simply Lloyd's FC (formerly known as Panguna Metals FC), is a professional soccer club from Panguna, Autonomous Region of Bougainville currently competing in the Arawa FA B-League. With nine titles, the club holds the record for most Arawa FA B-League championships. The club plays its home matches at the Niniku Oval stadium in Arawa.

== History ==
Panguna Metals FC was founded in 1998, consisting of players from Arawa and Panguna. The club is financially supported by the Bougainville Copper, operators of the Panguna mine. Originally the club's players belonged to the "Lost Generation", youth who suffered during the Bougainville conflict. The club's first major honour came in 2005 when it won the ABG Peace & Reconciliation Games. In 2011, Panguna Metals FC was selected to represent Bougainville at the Besta Cup, Papua New Guinea's most prestigious cup competition. That year, the club progressed to the semi-finals held in Lae, ultimately finishing third.

Panguna Metals FC won eight consecutive Arawa FA B-League titles between 2008 and 2015, becoming the region's dominate club for nearly a decade. The club reached its ninth consecutive Grand Final in 2016, losing its championship match to Poraka FC. After a hiatus of nearly two years which saw them sit out the B-League, they returned to the league in 2018. That season, they reached its tenth Grand Final, ultimately beating Extract FC for its ninth title. In 2022, the club competed in the Papua New Guinea Premier Soccer League. Panguna Metals dominated the Eastern Conference and advanced to the quarter-finals against Hekari United. The club lost only one match during the group stage. That season, the squad included several players that were part of the Papua New Guinea national under-20 soccer team that competed in 2022 OFC U-19 Championship.

In mid 2026, the operation of Panguna Mine was taken over by Indian mining firm, Lloyd's Metals and Energy. After the second round of the 2026 Arawa B-League, newly renamed Lloyd's Metals FC returned to the league. The club assumed the results of Extreme FC who, along with Eastern FC, withdrew from the league.

== Honours ==
Logo of Panguna Metals FC

- Papua New Guinea Premier Soccer League (Eastern Division)

Winners: (1) 2022

- Besta Cup

Third place: (1) 2011

- Arawa FA B-League

Winners: (9) 2008, 2009, 2010, 2011, 2012, 2013, 2014, 2015, 2018
Runners-up: (1) 2016

- Source(s):RSSSF
