= List of earthquakes in 2000 =

Earthquakes in 2000
Approximate epicenters of the earthquakes in 2000
- 4.0–5.9 magnitude
- 6.0–6.9 magnitude
- 7.0–7.9 magnitude
- 8.0+ magnitude
- Strongest: 8.0 M_{w} Papua New Guinea
- Deadliest: 7.9 M_{w} Indonesia; 141 deaths
- Total fatalities: 227

Number by magnitude
- 9.0+: 0
- 8.0–8.9: 1
- 7.0–7.9: 15
- 6.0–6.9: 146
- 5.0–5.9: 1,344
- 4.0–4.9: 7,968

This is a list of earthquakes in 2000. Only earthquakes of magnitude 6 or above are included, unless they result in significant damage and/or casualties. All dates are listed according to UTC time. The maximum intensities are based on the Modified Mercalli intensity scale. Earthquake magnitudes are based on data from the USGS and the ISC. Fifteen earthquakes ≥M7 occurred within the year, along with one ≥M8 event.

In a busy year with 16 major quakes, Papua New Guinea and Indonesia were hit particularly hard, with 7 of the 16 major quakes striking both countries; the largest earthquake of the year, measuring M_{w} 8.0–8.2, struck Papua New Guinea's Bismarck Archipelago, while the year's deadliest earthquake, a M_{w} 7.9 event, killed 141 people in Indonesia's Bengkulu province. The total death toll for earthquakes in 2000 was 227, much lower than previous and later years. Other notable and deadly earthquakes occurred in Azerbaijan, Turkmenistan, China, Turkey and Nicaragua.

== Compared to other years ==
Number of earthquakes worldwide for 1999–2009 []
| Magnitude | 1999 | 2000 | 2001 | 2002 | 2003 | 2004 | 2005 | 2006 | 2007 | 2008 | 2009 |
|---|---|---|---|---|---|---|---|---|---|---|---|
| 8.0–9.9 | 0 | 1 | 1 | 0 | 1 | 2 | 1 | 2 | 4 | 1 | 1 |
| 7.0–7.9 | 18 | 15 | 14 | 13 | 14 | 14 | 10 | 9 | 14 | 12 | 16 |
| 6.0–6.9 | 117 | 145 | 122 | 126 | 139 | 141 | 139 | 142 | 178 | 167 | 143 |
| 5.0–5.9 | 1,057 | 1,334 | 1,212 | 1,170 | 1,212 | 1,511 | 1,694 | 1,726 | 2,090 | 1,786 | 1,912 |
| 4.0–4.9 | 7,004 | 7,968 | 7,969 | 8,479 | 8,455 | 10,880 | 13,893 | 12,843 | 12,081 | 12,294 | 6,817 |
| Total | 8,296 | 9,462 | 9,319 | 9,788 | 9,823 | 12,551 | 15,738 | 14,723 | 14,367 | 14,261 | 8,891 |

== Overall ==
=== By death toll ===
| Rank | Death toll | Magnitude | Location | MMI | Depth (km) | Date | Event |
|---|---|---|---|---|---|---|---|
| 1 | 141 | 7.9 | Indonesia, Bengkulu offshore | VI (Strong) | 33.0 | June 4 | 2000 Enggano earthquake |
| 2 | 54 | 7.6 | Indonesia, Central Sulawesi offshore | VII (Very strong) | 26.0 | May 4 | 2000 Banggai Islands earthquake |
| 3 | 35 | 6.8 | Azerbaijan, Baku offshore | VI (Strong) | 35.0 | November 25 | 2000 Baku earthquake |
| 4 | 11 | 7.0 | Turkmenistan, Balkan | VII (Very strong) | 30.0 | December 6 | 2000 Turkmenistan earthquake |

Listed are earthquakes with at least 10 dead.

=== By magnitude ===
| Rank | Magnitude | Death toll | Location | MMI | Depth (km) | Date | Event |
|---|---|---|---|---|---|---|---|
| 1 | 8.0 | 2 | Papua New Guinea, East New Britain offshore | VIII (Severe) | 33.0 | November 16 | 2000 New Ireland earthquakes |
| 2 | 7.9 | 141 | Indonesia, Bengkulu offshore | VI (Strong) | 33.0 | June 4 | 2000 Enggano earthquake |
| 2 | 7.9 | 0 | (Cocos (Keeling) Islands) Cocos Islands offshore | II (Weak) | 10.0 | June 18 | 2000 Wharton Basin earthquake |
| 4 | 7.8 | 0 | Papua New Guinea, East New Britain offshore | VIII (Severe) | 30.0 | November 16 | 2000 New Ireland earthquakes |
| 4 | 7.8 | 0 | Papua New Guinea, East New Britain | VIII (Severe) | 33.0 | November 17 | 2000 New Ireland earthquakes |
| 6 | 7.6 | 0 | Japan, Volcano Islands offshore | I (Not felt) | 126.5 | March 28 | - |
| 6 | 7.6 | 0 | Indonesia, Bengkulu offshore | VII (Very strong) | 33.0 | June 4 | - |
| 6 | 7.6 | 46 | Indonesia, Central Sulawesi offshore | VII (Very strong) | 26.0 | May 5 | 2000 Banggai Islands earthquake |
| 9 | 7.4 | 0 | Japan, Bonin Islands offshore | I (Not felt) | 394.8 | August 6 | - |
| 10 | 7.2 | 0 | Tonga, Niuatoputapu offshore | VI (Strong) | 183.4 | January 8 | - |
| 10 | 7.2 | 1 | Argentina, Jujuy | V (Moderate) | 225.0 | May 12 | - |
| 12 | 7.1 | 0 | Vanuatu region offshore | IV (Light) | 33.0 | February 25 | - |
| 13 | 7.0 | 0 | Argentina, Santiago del Estero | I (Not felt) | 608.5 | April 23 | - |
| 13 | 7.0 | 0 | Vanuatu, Sanma | VIII (Severe) | 23.0 | October 24 | - |
| 13 | 7.0 | 0 | Papua New Guinea, Autonomous Region of Bougainville offshore | VII (Very strong) | 50.0 | October 29 | - |
| 13 | 7.0 | 11 | Turkmenistan, Balkan | VII (Very strong) | 30.0 | December 6 | 2000 Turkmenistan earthquake |

Listed are earthquakes with at least 7.0 magnitude.

== By month ==
=== January ===
January
- Strongest: 7.2 M_{w} Tonga
- Deadliest: 5.9 M_{w} China; 7 deaths
- Total fatalities: 7

Number by magnitude
- 9.0+: 0
- 8.0–8.9: 0
- 7.0–7.9: 1
- 6.0–6.9: 14
- 5.0–5.9: 91
- 4.0–4.9: 498

| Date | Country and location | M_{w} | Depth (km) | MMI | Notes | Casualties | |
| Date | Country and location | M_{w} | Depth (km) | MMI | Notes | Dead | Injured |
|---|---|---|---|---|---|---|---|
| 1 | West of Macquarie Island offshore | 6.0 | 10.0 | - | - | - | - |
| 1 | Canada, Quebec, 17 km (11 mi) north-northeast of Notre-Dame-du-Lac | 4.7 | 18.0 | VI | Further information: 2000 Kipawa earthquake | - | - |
| 3 | India, Mizoram, 45 km (28 mi) south-southwest of Saiha | 4.6 | 33.0 | IV | At least 100 homes damaged in Moheshkhali, Bangladesh. | - | - |
| 5 | Solomon Islands, Temotu offshore, 84 km (52 mi) south-southwest of Lata | 6.1 | 33.0 | VI | - | - | - |
| 6 | United States, Alaska offshore, 35 km (22 mi) west-southwest of Elfin Cove | 6.1 | 1.0 | I | - | - | - |
| 6 | Philippines, Ilocos offshore, 32 km (20 mi) west of Aloleng | 6.2 | 33.0 | VI | Aftershock of the 1999 Luzon earthquake. | - | - |
| 8 | Solomon Islands, Guadalcanal offshore, 15 km (9.3 mi) southeast of Malango | 6.4 | 33.0 | IX | Minor damage in Honiara. | - | - |
| 8 | Chile, Antofagasta, 60 km (37 mi) north-northeast of Antofagasta | 6.4 | 36.0 | VIII | Power outages in the Calama area. | - | - |
| 8 | Tonga, Niuatoputapu offshore, 117 km (73 mi) south-southwest of Hihifo | 7.2 | 183.4 | VI | - | - | - |
| 9 | Fiji region offshore | 6.5 | 33.0 | - | - | - | - |
| 11 | China, Liaoning, 32 km (20 mi) northwest of Xiuyan | 5.1 | 10.0 | VI | Thirty people injured, 3,600 homes destroyed and 8,800 others damaged in Liaoning Province. | - | 30 |
| 13 | Fiji, Lau offshore, 211 km (131 mi) east-northeast of Levuka | 6.2 | 535.0 | - | - | - | - |
| 14 | China, Yunnan, 85 km (53 mi) east of Dali | 5.9 | 33.0 | VIII | Further information: 2000 Yao'an earthquake | 7 | 2,528 |
| 15 | Fiji region offshore | 6.0 | 632.8 | - | - | - | - |
| 19 | Afghanistan, Badakhshan, 51 km (32 mi) east-southeast of Farkhar | 6.0 | 206.9 | IV | - | - | - |
| 20 | United States, Oregon offshore, 238 km (148 mi) west-northwest of Bandon | 6.1 | 10.0 | - | - | - | - |
| 26 | Tonga, Niuatoputapu offshore, 147 km (91 mi) south of Hihifo | 6.3 | 33.0 | - | - | - | - |
| 26 | China, Yunnan, 28 km (17 mi) south of Zhongshu | 4.9 | 33.0 | IV | Two people injured and roads and houses damaged in the Mile-Qiubei area. | - | 2 |
| 28 | Russia, Sakhalin offshore, 84 km (52 mi) south of Shikotan | 6.8 | 61.1 | VII | Two people injured in Nemuro, Japan. | - | 2 |
| 28 | Japan, Okinawa offshore, 162 km (101 mi) north-northwest of Hirara | 6.0 | 193.9 | - | - | - | - |

=== February ===
February
- Strongest: 7.1 M_{w} Vanuatu region
- Deadliest: 5.3 M_{w} Iran; 1 death
- Total fatalities: 1

Number by magnitude
- 9.0+: 0
- 8.0–8.9: 0
- 7.0–7.9: 1
- 6.0–6.9: 7
- 5.0–5.9: 87

| Date | Country and location | M_{w} | Depth (km) | MMI | Notes | Casualties | |
| Date | Country and location | M_{w} | Depth (km) | MMI | Notes | Dead | Injured |
|---|---|---|---|---|---|---|---|
| 2 | Iran, Razavi Khorasan, 22 km (14 mi) east of Bardaskan | 5.3 | 33.0 | VIII | One person killed, 15 injured, 100 houses destroyed and 300 others damaged in the Bardaskan-Kashmar area. | 1 | 15 |
| 6 | Papua New Guinea, East New Britain, 87 km (54 mi) east-southeast of Kimbe | 6.6 | 33.0 | VIII | - | - | - |
| 7 | South Africa, Mpumalanga, 22 km (14 mi) northwest of Mhlambanyatsi, Eswatini | 4.5 | 5.0 | VI | One person injured, moderate damage and landslides in the Mbabane-Manzini area. | - | 1 |
| 13 | Russia, Primorsky offshore, 15 km (9.3 mi) east of Slavyanka | 6.0 | 513.6 | - | - | - | - |
| 14 | Turkey, Düzce, 28 km (17 mi) southwest of Devrek | 4.9 | 10.0 | V | Some buildings destroyed in Mengen, Bolu and telecommunications disrupted in Zonguldak Province. | - | - |
| 25 | Vanuatu region offshore | 7.1 | 33.0 | IV | - | - | - |
| 26 | Guam offshore, 30 km (19 mi) north-northwest of Yigo Village | 6.2 | 132.2 | V | Several people injured, power outages and water facilities disrupted in Yona and minor damage to a school in Sånta Rita-Sumai. | - | Several |
| 26 | Panama, Guna Yala, 7 km (4.3 mi) southeast of Narganá | 6.1 | 65.0 | V | Several buildings damaged in Panama City. | - | - |
| 28 | Fiji, Lau offshore, 187 km (116 mi) east-northeast of Levuka | 6.0 | 538.0 | - | - | - | - |
| 29 | southern East Pacific Rise | 6.0 | 10.0 | - | - | - | - |
| 29 | Vanuatu, Tafea offshore, 87 km (54 mi) east-southeast of Port Vila | 6.0 | 33.0 | V | - | - | - |

=== March ===
March
- Strongest: 7.6 M_{w} Japan
- Total fatalities: 0

Number by magnitude
- 9.0+: 0
- 8.0–8.9: 0
- 7.0–7.9: 1
- 6.0–6.9: 5
- 5.0–5.9: 88

| Date | Country and location | M_{w} | Depth (km) | MMI | Notes | Casualties | |
| Date | Country and location | M_{w} | Depth (km) | MMI | Notes | Dead | Injured |
|---|---|---|---|---|---|---|---|
| 3 | Indonesia, Maluku offshore, 211 km (131 mi) northeast of Lospalos, Timor-Leste | 6.4 | 141.9 | V | - | - | - |
| 3 | Papua New Guinea, Southern Highlands, 62 km (39 mi) south-southwest of Ialibu | 6.6 | 10.0 | VIII | - | - | - |
| 4 | West of Macquarie Island | 6.4 | 10.0 | - | - | - | - |
| 5 | South of Australia | 6.1 | 10.0 | - | - | - | - |
| 12 | India, Maharashtra, 26 km (16 mi) southeast of Mākhjan | 5.0 | 33.0 | VI | Several houses destroyed and some buildings damaged at Dahivadi district. | - | - |
| 12 | Mexico, Chiapas, 3 km (1.9 mi) east-southeast of Plan de Ayala | 6.3 | 62.0 | VI | Some damage in Quezaltenango and San Marcos, Guatemala. | - | - |
| 28 | Japan, Volcano Islands offshore | 7.6 | 126.5 | I | - | - | - |

=== April ===
April
- Strongest: 7.0 M_{w} Argentina
- Total fatalities: 0

Number by magnitude
- 9.0+: 0
- 8.0–8.9: 0
- 7.0–7.9: 1
- 6.0–6.9: 5
- 5.0–5.9: 80

| Date | Country and location | M_{w} | Depth (km) | MMI | Notes | Casualties | |
| Date | Country and location | M_{w} | Depth (km) | MMI | Notes | Dead | Injured |
|---|---|---|---|---|---|---|---|
| 3 | Indonesia, North Sulawesi offshore, 147 km (91 mi) south of Sarangani, Philippines | 6.2 | 150.0 | - | - | - | - |
| 6 | India, Maharashtra, 19 km (12 mi) southeast of Mākhjan | 4.9 | 10.0 | VI | Two people injured and 150 homes damaged in the Koynanagar-Kolhapur area. | - | 2 |
| 7 | Mauritius, Rodrigues offshore, 286 km (178 mi) northeast of Port Mathurin | 6.3 | 10.0 | - | - | - | - |
| 18 | Tonga, Tongatapu offshore, 141 km (88 mi) west-northwest of Haveluloto | 6.0 | 220.7 | I | - | - | - |
| 21 | United States, Alaska offshore, 115 km (71 mi) west-southwest of Adak | 6.0 | 33.0 | I | - | - | - |
| 23 | Argentina, Santiago del Estero, 22 km (14 mi) northwest of Añatuya | 7.0 | 608.5 | I | - | - | - |
| 23 | Argentina, Santiago del Estero, 13 km (8.1 mi) northwest of Añatuya | 6.1 | 609.8 | - | Aftershock of the 7.0 event eight hours prior. | - | - |
| 28 | Tanzania, Mbeya, 6 km (3.7 mi) north-northeast of Masoko | 4.3 | 10.0 | IV | At least 700 homes damaged or destroyed in the epicentral area. | - | - |

=== May ===
May
- Strongest: 7.6 M_{w} Indonesia
- Deadliest: 7.6 M_{w} Indonesia; 54 deaths
- Total fatalities: 58

Number by magnitude
- 9.0+: 0
- 8.0–8.9: 0
- 7.0–7.9: 2
- 6.0–6.9: 8
- 5.0–5.9: 83

| Date | Country and location | M_{w} | Depth (km) | MMI | Notes | Casualties | |
| Date | Country and location | M_{w} | Depth (km) | MMI | Notes | Dead | Injured |
|---|---|---|---|---|---|---|---|
| 2 | Northern Mariana Islands region offshore | 6.0 | 55.0 | - | - | - | - |
| 4 | Indonesia, Central Sulawesi offshore, 89 km (55 mi) east of Luwuk | 7.6 | 26.0 | VII | Main article: 2000 Banggai Islands earthquake | 54 | 270 |
| 4 | Fiji, Lau offshore, 229 km (142 mi) east of Levuka | 6.5 | 515.8 | - | - | - | - |
| 5 | Solomon Islands, Temotu offshore, 74 km (46 mi) south-southwest of Lata | 6.3 | 12.0 | VI | - | - | - |
| 7 | Turkey, Malatya, 20 km (12 mi) northeast of Sincik | 4.5 | 5.4 | VI | One person injured and 200 homes damaged in the Doğanyol-Pütürge area. | - | 1 |
| 8 | Papua New Guinea, West New Britain offshore, 121 km (75 mi) north of Kimbe | 6.1 | 502.0 | - | - | - | - |
| 12 | Turkey, Osmaniye, 5 km (3.1 mi) west-southwest of Toprakkale | 4.7 | 10.0 | VI | Some people injured and buildings damaged in the Osmaniye area. | - | Some |
| 12 | Argentina, Jujuy, 75 km (47 mi) north of San Antonio de los Cobres | 7.2 | 225.0 | VI | One person killed at the Mantoverde mine in Atacama, Chile. | 1 | - |
| 12 | Afghanistan, Badakhshan, 66 km (41 mi) north-northwest of Parun | 6.3 | 107.7 | V | - | - | - |
| 14 | Indonesia, Southeast Sulawesi offshore, 80 km (50 mi) east-southeast of Kendari | 6.3 | 33.0 | IX | Some buildings damaged in the Kendari area. | - | - |
| 17 | Taiwan, Taichung, 29 km (18 mi) north-northeast of Puli | 5.4 | 10.0 | VII | Three people killed, 13 injured and landslides in Taichung County. | 3 | 13 |
| 21 | Norway, Svalbard and Jan Mayen offshore, 34 km (21 mi) north-northeast of Olonkinbyen | 6.0 | 10.0 | - | - | - | - |
| 26 | Federated States of Micronesia, Yap offshore, 224 km (139 mi) northwest of Fais | 6.0 | 33.0 | - | - | - | - |

=== June ===
June
- Strongest: 7.9 M_{w} Indonesia; 7.9 M_{w} Cocos Islands
- Deadliest: 7.9 M_{w} Indonesia; 141 deaths
- Total fatalities: 146

Number by magnitude
- 9.0+: 0
- 8.0–8.9: 0
- 7.0–7.9: 3
- 6.0–6.9: 23
- 5.0–5.9: 135

| Date | Country and location | M_{w} | Depth (km) | MMI | Notes | Casualties | |
| Date | Country and location | M_{w} | Depth (km) | MMI | Notes | Dead | Injured |
|---|---|---|---|---|---|---|---|
| 2 | United States, Oregon offshore, 474 km (295 mi) west of Yachats | 6.2 | 10.0 | - | - | - | - |
| 3 | Japan, Chiba, 6 km (3.7 mi) southeast of Narutō | 6.2 | 62.3 | VI | One person injured in Ichikawa and 40 structures damaged in the Tako-Togane-Yōkaichiba-Ōamishirasato area. | - | 1 |
| 4 | Indonesia, Bengkulu offshore, 103 km (64 mi) south of Bengkulu | 7.9 | 33.0 | VI | Further information: 2000 Enggano earthquake | 141 | 2,585 |
| 4 | Indonesia, Bengkulu offshore, 95 km (59 mi) south of Bengkulu | 7.6 | 35.0 | VII | Aftershock of the 2000 Enggano earthquake. | - | - |
| 4 | Pakistan, Balochistan, 15 km (9.3 mi) north-northwest of Kharan | 6.0 | 33.0 | IX | - | - | - |
| 6 | Turkey, Çankırı, 12 km (7.5 mi) northwest of Orta | 6.0 | 10.0 | VIII | Two people killed, 80 others injured and 4,600 homes damaged in the Çerkeş-Çubuk-Orta area. | 2 | 80 |
| 6 | Indonesia, Bengkulu offshore, 132 km (82 mi) south-southwest of Pagar Alam | 6.2 | 33.0 | VII | Aftershock of the 2000 Enggano earthquake. | - | - |
| 6 | China, Gansu, 61 km (38 mi) north-northwest of Baiyin | 5.6 | 10.0 | VIII | Twenty people injured and buildings damaged in the Baiyin area. | - | 20 |
| 6 | Japan, Fukui offshore, 91 km (57 mi) northwest of Mikuni | 5.9 | 10.0 | VI | Three people injured and 29 structures damaged in the Fukui-Ishikawa area. | - | 3 |
| 6 | Japan, Kagoshima offshore, 124 km (77 mi) southeast of Koshima | 6.4 | 33.0 | V | - | - | - |
| 7 | Myanmar, Kachin, 83 km (52 mi) north-northeast of Sarupathar, India | 6.3 | 33.0 | IX | Many buildings damaged in Liuku, China. | - | - |
| 6 | Indonesia, Bengkulu offshore, 98 km (61 mi) south-southwest of Bengkulu | 6.7 | 33.0 | VII | Aftershock of the 2000 Enggano earthquake. One person killed and 600 buildings damaged in Lahat Regency. | 1 | - |
| 9 | Papua New Guinea, East New Britain offshore, 84 km (52 mi) south-southeast of Kokopo | 6.3 | 33.0 | VI | - | - | - |
| 9 | Indonesia, Bengkulu offshore, 179 km (111 mi) southwest of Pagar Alam | 6.0 | 33.0 | VII | Aftershock of the 2000 Enggano earthquake. | - | - |
| 9 | Solomon Islands, Makira-Ulawa offshore, 94 km (58 mi) south of Kirakira | 6.1 | 33.0 | V | - | - | - |
| 9 | Japan, Izu Islands offshore | 6.3 | 485.3 | - | - | - | - |
| 10 | Taiwan, Nantou, 29 km (18 mi) east-southeast of Puli | 6.4 | 33.0 | IX | Aftershock of the 1999 Jiji earthquake. Two people died of heart attacks and 36 others injured in Nantou County. Landslides and rockslides blocked many highways in central Taiwan. | 2 | 36 |
| 11 | western Indian-Antarctic Ridge | 6.6 | 10.0 | - | - | - | - |
| 14 | south of the Fiji Islands | 6.4 | 604.6 | - | - | - | - |
| 14 | Indonesia, North Sulawesi offshore, 264 km (164 mi) southeast of Pondaguitan | 6.3 | 89.5 | IV | - | - | - |
| 14 | Fiji, Nadroga-Navosa offshore, 128 km (80 mi) west of Nadi | 6.0 | 33.0 | - | - | - | - |
| 15 | Japan, Kagoshima offshore, 177 km (110 mi) east-southeast of Koshima | 6.1 | 10.0 | I | - | - | - |
| 15 | Chile, Santiago, 53 km (33 mi) east-southeast of Puente Alto | 6.4 | 120.2 | VI | Power outages occurred in the Curicó-Rancagua-Santiago-Valparaíso area and landslides in Maipo. | - | - |
| 17 | Iceland, Southern, 25 km (16 mi) east of Selfoss | 6.5 | 10.0 | IX | Further information: 2000 Iceland earthquakes | - | 1 |
| 18 | Cocos Islands offshore | 7.9 | 10.0 | II | Further information: 2000 Enggano earthquake § Wharton Basin event | - | - |
| 21 | Iceland, Southern, 12 km (7.5 mi) east-northeast of Selfoss | 6.5 | 10.0 | IX | Further information: 2000 Iceland earthquakes | - | Several |
| 25 | Japan, Kagoshima offshore, 33 km (21 mi) south of Kushima | 6.0 | 10.0 | VII | - | - | - |

=== July ===
July
- Strongest: 6.6 M_{w} Papua New Guinea
- Deadliest: 5.4 M_{w} Nicaragua; 7 deaths
- Total fatalities: 11

Number by magnitude
- 9.0+: 0
- 8.0–8.9: 0
- 7.0–7.9: 0
- 6.0–6.9: 12
- 5.0–5.9: 138

| Date | Country and location | M_{w} | Depth (km) | MMI | Notes | Casualties | |
| Date | Country and location | M_{w} | Depth (km) | MMI | Notes | Dead | Injured |
|---|---|---|---|---|---|---|---|
| 1 | Japan, Izu islands, 53 km (33 mi) south-southeast of Shimoda | 6.1 | 10.0 | IX | Further information: 2000 Izu Islands earthquakes | 1 | Several |
| 6 | Nicaragua, Granada, 6 km (3.7 mi) southwest of Granada | 5.4 | 33.0 | VIII | Further information: 2000 Nicaragua earthquake | 7 | 42 |
| 7 | Turkey, Istanbul offshore, 7 km (4.3 mi) west of İçmeler | 4.2 | 8.8 | VI | One person died from a heart attack and 34 others injured in the Gebze-Kartal area. | 1 | 34 |
| 11 | United States, Alaska offshore, 24 km (15 mi) south-southwest of Larsen Bay | 6.5 | 42.9 | VI | Minor damage on Kodiak Island. | - | - |
| 11 | Austria, Lower Austria, 2 km (1.2 mi) west of Moosbrunn | 5.3 | 10.0 | VII | Minor damage in the Burgenland-Niederoesterreich area. | - | - |
| 12 | Indonesia, West Java, 4 km (2.5 mi) northeast of Caringin | 5.4 | 33.0 | VII | Six people injured and 200 houses damaged in Bogor Regency; four buildings damaged in Bandung Regency; four people injured, 1,717 homes destroyed, 6,183 others, 136 schools, 127 mosques, 91 office buildings, an irrigation building and a hospital damaged in Sukabumi Regency; one building damaged in Banten. | - | 10 |
| 15 | Japan, Izu islands offshore, 49 km (30 mi) southeast of Shimoda | 6.1 | 10.0 | IX | Further information: 2000 Izu Islands earthquakes | - | 10 |
| 16 | Philippines, Cagayan Valley offshore, 22 km (14 mi) south-southeast of Basco | 6.4 | 33.0 | VIII | Six people injured, many houses and a church damaged and utilities disrupted in the Basco area. A landslide blocked a highway near Mount Iraya. | - | 6 |
| 16 | Papua New Guinea, Milne Bay offshore, 227 km (141 mi) southeast of Kandrian | 6.6 | 10.0 | VI | - | - | - |
| 16 | Indonesia, Highland Papua, 260 km (160 mi) southwest of Abepura | 5.8 | 33.0 | VIII | An airport control tower and several other buildings damaged in the epicentral area. | - | - |
| 16 | Vanuatu, Torba offshore, 198 km (123 mi) northwest of Sola | 6.1 | 33.0 | - | - | - | - |
| 19 | Afghanistan, Badakhshan, 65 km (40 mi) south of Jurm | 6.3 | 141.4 | IV | Two people killed by the collapse of a three-story building in Peshawar, Pakistan. | 2 | - |
| 20 | Japan, Ibaraki offshore, 31 km (19 mi) east-southeast of Hitachi | 6.0 | 47.1 | VI | - | - | - |
| 21 | Costa Rica, Puntarenas offshore, 55 km (34 mi) south-southeast of Sámara | 6.4 | 33.0 | VI | - | - | - |
| 28 | Taiwan, Kaohsiung, 46 km (29 mi) south-southeast of Lugu | 5.7 | 33.0 | VII | One person injured and two buildings destroyed by rockslides in Nantou County. Rockslides blocked a highway in Chiayi County. | - | 1 |
| 30 | Japan, Izu islands offshore, 94 km (58 mi) south-southeast of Shimoda | 6.5 | 10.0 | VIII | Further information: 2000 Izu Islands earthquakes | - | 1 |
| 31 | Fiji region offshore | 6.2 | 10.0 | - | - | - | - |
| 31 | New Zealand, Kermadec Islands offshore | 6.2 | 10.0 | - | - | - | - |

=== August ===
August
- Strongest: 7.4 M_{w} Japan
- Deadliest: 4.9 M_{w} China; 1 death
- Total fatalities: 1

Number by magnitude
- 9.0+: 0
- 8.0–8.9: 0
- 7.0–7.9: 1
- 6.0–6.9: 14
- 5.0–5.9: 117

| Date | Country and location | M_{w} | Depth (km) | MMI | Notes | Casualties | |
| Date | Country and location | M_{w} | Depth (km) | MMI | Notes | Dead | Injured |
|---|---|---|---|---|---|---|---|
| 3 | Solomon Islands, Temotu offshore, 161 km (100 mi) south-southeast of Lata | 6.6 | 33.0 | VII | - | - | - |
| 4 | Russia, Sakhalin, 35 km (22 mi) south-southeast of Uglegorsk | 6.8 | 10.0 | X | Eight people injured, 19,100 displaced, 1,390 buildings damaged and a landslide destroyed roads and power lines in the Uglegorsk-Makarov area. | - | 8 |
| 6 | Japan, Bonin Islands offshore | 7.4 | 394.8 | I | - | - | - |
| 7 | Indonesia, East Nusa Tenggara offshore 217 km (135 mi) northeast of Maumere | 6.5 | 648.5 | - | - | - | - |
| 9 | Vanuatu, Penama offshore, 75 km (47 mi) east-northeast of Norsup | 6.3 | 33.0 | IX | - | - | - |
| 9 | Mexico, Michoacán, 24 km (15 mi) north-northwest of El Habillal | 6.5 | 45.8 | VIII | One person injured, some buildings damaged and power outages at Lazaro Cardenas. | - | 1 |
| 9 | Fiji region offshore | 6.4 | 33.0 | - | - | - | - |
| 12 | Indonesia, Central Papua, 75 km (47 mi) east-northeast of Nabire | 6.0 | 33.0 | VII | - | - | - |
| 14 | Papua New Guinea, Milne Bay offshore | 6.0 | 10.0 | - | - | - | - |
| 15 | New Zealand, Kermadec Islands offshore | 6.6 | 357.7 | I | - | - | - |
| 19 | Turkey, Erzurum, 25 km (16 mi) south-southwest of Erzurum | 4.1 | 33.0 | V | Nine people injured in Erzurum. | - | 9 |
| 21 | South Atlantic Ocean | 6.1 | 10.0 | - | - | - | - |
| 21 | China, Yunnan, 93 km (58 mi) south-southeast of Dadukou | 4.9 | 33.0 | VII | One person killed, 406 injured, over 169,000 homeless and extensive damage in Wuding County. | 1 | 406 |
| 23 | Turkey, Sakarya, 8 km (5.0 mi) east of Akyazı | 5.3 | 15.3 | VI | At least 22 people injured in Sakarya Province. | - | 22 |
| 28 | Indonesia, Maluku offshore, 98 km (61 mi) west-southwest of Ambon | 6.8 | 16.0 | VII | - | - | - |
| 28 | Indonesia, Maluku offshore, 100 km (62 mi) west-southwest of Ambon | 6.1 | 10.0 | VI | Aftershocks of the 6.8 event earlier that day. | - | - |
| 28 | Indonesia, Maluku offshore, 109 km (68 mi) west-southwest of Ambon | 6.0 | 33.0 | V | Aftershocks of the 6.8 event earlier that day. | - | - |
| 28 | Indonesia, Maluku offshore, 136 km (85 mi) west-southwest of Ambon | 6.3 | 33.0 | VI | Aftershocks of the 6.8 event earlier that day. | - | - |

=== September ===
September
- Strongest: 6.4 M_{w} Tonga; 6.4 M_{w} Ecuador
- Deadliest: 5.5 M_{w} Ecuador; 1 death
- Total fatalities: 1

Number by magnitude
- 9.0+: 0
- 8.0–8.9: 0
- 7.0–7.9: 0
- 6.0–6.9: 10
- 5.0–5.9: 80

| Date | Country and location | M_{w} | Depth (km) | MMI | Notes | Casualties | |
| Date | Country and location | M_{w} | Depth (km) | MMI | Notes | Dead | Injured |
|---|---|---|---|---|---|---|---|
| 1 | Indonesia, North Sumatra offshore, 117 km (73 mi) south-southeast of Sinabang | 6.0 | 33.0 | IV | - | - | - |
| 2 | Fiji, Lau offshore, 275 km (171 mi) east-southeast of Levuka | 6.0 | 687.6 | - | - | - | - |
| 3 | United States, California, 5 km (3.1 mi) west-southwest of Yountville | 4.9 | 9.4 | VII | Forty-one people injured and considerable damage in the Napa area. | - | 41 |
| 10 | Taiwan, Hualien, 8 km (5.0 mi) west-northwest of Hualien City | 5.8 | 34.8 | VIII | Roads damaged and power outages in eastern and central Taiwan. | - | - |
| 10 | Indonesia, Southwest Papua offshore, 216 km (134 mi) west of Sorong | 6.1 | 33.0 | IX | - | - | - |
| 11 | Tonga, Niuatoputapu offshore, 14 km (8.7 mi) northeast of Hihifo | 6.3 | 115.4 | I | - | - | - |
| 12 | China, Qinghai, 257 km (160 mi) west-southwest of Xining | 6.1 | 10.0 | IX | - | - | - |
| 12 | Indonesia, Bengkulu offshore, 187 km (116 mi) south-southwest of Bengkulu | 6.0 | 33.0 | VI | Aftershock of the 7.9 event on 4 June. | - | - |
| 14 | Fiji, Macuata offshore, 89 km (55 mi) north-northeast of Labasa | 6.2 | 33.0 | VI | - | - | - |
| 20 | Ecuador, Manabí, 26 km (16 mi) west-southwest of Pedro Carbo | 5.5 | 33.0 | VII | One person killed and some damage in Manabí Province. | 1 | - |
| 22 | Indonesia, Bengkulu offshore, 129 km (80 mi) south of Bengkulu | 6.2 | 33.0 | VII | Aftershock of the 7.9 event on 4 June. | - | - |
| 26 | Tonga, Vavaʻu offshore, 136 km (85 mi) south of Hihifo | 6.4 | 56.0 | - | - | - | - |
| 28 | Ecuador, Manabí offshore, 45 km (28 mi) north-northwest of Bahía de Caráquez | 6.4 | 22.9 | VIII | Minor damage in Chone and Quito. | - | - |

=== October ===
October
- Strongest: 7.0 M_{w} Vanuatu; 7.0 M_{w} Papua New Guinea
- Total fatalities: 0

Number by magnitude
- 9.0+: 0
- 8.0–8.9: 0
- 7.0–7.9: 2
- 6.0–6.9: 14
- 5.0–5.9: 107

| Date | Country and location | M_{w} | Depth (km) | MMI | Notes | Casualties | |
| Date | Country and location | M_{w} | Depth (km) | MMI | Notes | Dead | Injured |
|---|---|---|---|---|---|---|---|
| 2 | Tanzania, Rukwa, 15 km (9.3 mi) west of Nkove | 6.5 | 34.0 | VIII | Six people injured, seven homes destroyed and 150 more damaged in Nkasi District. | - | 6 |
| 3 | Japan, Iwate offshore, 123 km (76 mi) northeast of Miyako | 6.3 | 33.0 | I | - | - | - |
| 4 | Turkey, Denizli, 5 km (3.1 mi) south-southwest of Akköy | 4.6 | 8.3 | VI | Thirty-one people injured in Denizli. | - | 31 |
| 4 | Venezuela, Sucre offshore, 66 km (41 mi) north-northwest of Güiria | 6.2 | 110.3 | VI | Minor damage in the Maraval-Diego Martin area, Trinidad and Tobago. | - | - |
| 4 | Vanuatu, Sanma, 29 km (18 mi) west-northwest of Luganville | 7.0 | 23.0 | VIII | - | - | - |
| 5 | Northern Mid-Atlantic Ridge | 6.1 | 10.0 | - | - | - | - |
| 5 | Philippines, Davao offshore, 46 km (29 mi) east-southeast of Jovellar | 6.1 | 87.3 | VI | - | - | - |
| 6 | Japan, Shimane, 8 km (5.0 mi) east-southeast of Matsue | 6.7 | 10.0 | X | Further information: 2000 Tottori earthquake | - | 182 |
| 21 | Tonga, Vava‘u offshore, 196 km (122 mi) northwest of Neiafu | 6.3 | 291.8 | - | - | - | - |
| 21 | Southern Mid-Atlantic Ridge | 6.0 | 10.0 | - | - | - | - |
| 25 | Southern East Pacific Rise | 6.0 | 10.0 | - | - | - | - |
| 25 | Indonesia, Banten, 29 km (18 mi) southwest of Labuan | 6.8 | 38.0 | VIII | At least 260 structures destroyed and 1,077 others damaged in Pandeglang Regency. Minor damage and power outages in Banten, Jakarta and Pandeglang. | - | - |
| 25 | Southern East Pacific Rise | 6.1 | 10.0 | - | - | - | - |
| 27 | Japan, Bonin Islands offshore | 6.1 | 388.0 | I | - | - | - |
| 29 | Papua New Guinea, Autonomous Region of Bougainville offshore, 191 km (119 mi) east-southeast of Kokopo | 7.0 | 50.0 | VII | - | - | - |
| 30 | Indonesia, East Nusa Tenggara offshore, 130 km (81 mi) west of Waingapu | 6.0 | 33.0 | VII | - | - | - |
| 30 | Japan, Mie, 26 km (16 mi) south of Owase | 5.5 | 34.9 | VI | Seven people injured; four in Mie and one each in Aichi, Gifu and Nara Prefectures. | - | 7 |
| 30 | Tajikistan, Khatlon, 8 km (5.0 mi) north-northwest of Yangī Qal‘ah, Afghanistan | 5.1 | 33.0 | IV | At least 800 buildings damaged and 17,000 people homeless in the Farkhor area. | - | - |
| 31 | Tonga, Vava‘u offshore, 165 km (103 mi) northwest of Neiafu | 6.2 | 33.0 | - | - | - | - |

=== November ===
November
- Strongest: 8.0 M_{w} Papua New Guinea
- Deadliest: 6.8 M_{w} Azerbaijan; 35 deaths
- Total fatalities: 39

Number by magnitude
- 9.0+: 0
- 8.0–8.9: 1
- 7.0–7.9: 2
- 6.0–6.9: 20
- 5.0–5.9: 213

| Date | Country and location | M_{w} | Depth (km) | MMI | Notes | Casualties | |
| Date | Country and location | M_{w} | Depth (km) | MMI | Notes | Dead | Injured |
|---|---|---|---|---|---|---|---|
| 1 | New Zealand, Southland offshore, 67 km (42 mi) northwest of Te Anau | 6.1 | 24.5 | VIII | - | - | - |
| 7 | South Georgia and the South Sandwich Islands, South Sandwich Islands offshore | 6.8 | 10.0 | - | - | - | - |
| 7 | Papua New Guinea, East New Britain offshore, 151 km (94 mi) south-southwest of Kokopo | 6.0 | 33.0 | VIII | Foreshock of the 7.8 event on 17 November. | - | - |
| 7 | Papua New Guinea, Autonomous Region of Bougainville offshore, 189 km (117 mi) west-northwest of Panguna | 6.2 | 90.5 | IV | Aftershock of the 7.0 event on 29 October. | - | - |
| 8 | Colombia, Chocó offshore, 10 km (6.2 mi) southwest of Juradó | 6.5 | 17.0 | IX | Two people injured, 86 houses and some municipal buildings damaged in Juradó. Minor damage to some buildings at Boca de Cupe, Panama. | - | 2 |
| 10 | Algeria, Béjaïa, 5 km (3.1 mi) south of el hed | 5.7 | 10.0 | VIII | Two people killed; one in Bougaa and another at Chemini. Twelve people injured and at least seven houses destroyed in Beni Ourtilane. | 2 | 12 |
| 13 | Japan, Hokkaido offshore, 62 km (39 mi) south-southeast of Kushiro | 6.0 | 33.0 | IV | - | - | - |
| 16 | Papua New Guinea, East New Britain offshore, 24 km (15 mi) north of Rabaul | 8.0 | 33.0 | VIII | Further information: 2000 New Ireland earthquakes | 2 | - |
| 16 | Papua New Guinea, New Ireland offshore, 134 km (83 mi) southeast of Kokopo | 6.0 | 33.0 | IV | Foreshock of the 7.8 event two hours later. | - | - |
| 16 | Papua New Guinea, New Ireland offshore, 135 km (84 mi) southeast of Kokopo | 7.8 | 30.0 | VIII | Further information: 2000 New Ireland earthquakes | - | - |
| 16 | Papua New Guinea, New Ireland offshore, 118 km (73 mi) east-southeast of Kokopo | 6.5 | 33.0 | VII | Aftershocks of the 7.8 event earlier that day. | - | - |
| 16 | Papua New Guinea, New Ireland offshore, 130 km (81 mi) southeast of Kokopo | 6.2 | 33.0 | VII | Aftershocks of the 7.8 event earlier that day. | - | - |
| 17 | Papua New Guinea, East New Britain, 138 km (86 mi) south-southwest of Kokopo | 7.8 | 33.0 | VIII | Further information: 2000 New Ireland earthquakes | - | - |
| 18 | Papua New Guinea, New Ireland offshore, 131 km (81 mi) southeast of Kokopo | 6.6 | 33.0 | VI | Aftershock of the 7.8 event on 16 November. | - | - |
| 18 | Papua New Guinea, East New Britain, 112 km (70 mi) south-southwest of Kokopo | 6.8 | 33.0 | VIII | Aftershock of the 7.8 event on 17 November. | - | - |
| 18 | Papua New Guinea, New Ireland offshore, 174 km (108 mi) southeast of Kokopo | 6.1 | 33.0 | - | Aftershock of the 7.8 event on 16 November. | - | - |
| 19 | Papua New Guinea, East New Britain, 110 km (68 mi) southwest of Kokopo | 6.0 | 57.8 | V | Aftershocks of the 7.8 event on 17 November. | - | - |
| 19 | Papua New Guinea, East New Britain offshore, 144 km (89 mi) south-southwest of Kokopo | 6.1 | 33.0 | VI | Aftershocks of the 7.8 event on 17 November. | - | - |
| 21 | Papua New Guinea, East New Britain offshore, 128 km (80 mi) south of Kokopo | 6.2 | 33.0 | VIII | Aftershocks of the 7.8 event on 17 November. | - | - |
| 21 | Papua New Guinea, East New Britain offshore, 128 km (80 mi) south-southeast of Kokopo | 6.1 | 33.0 | V | Aftershocks of the 7.8 event on 17 November. | - | - |
| 18 | Papua New Guinea, New Ireland, 91 km (57 mi) east-southeast of Kokopo | 6.3 | 33.0 | VI | Aftershock of the 7.8 event on 16 November. | - | - |
| 25 | Azerbaijan, Baku offshore, 15 km (9.3 mi) south-southeast of Baku | 6.8 | 50.4 | VI | Further information: 2000 Baku earthquake | 35 | 600 |
| 25 | Azerbaijan, Baku offshore, 23 km (14 mi) south-southeast of Badamdar | 6.5 | 33.0 | VII | Aftershock of the 6.8 event a minute later. | - | - |
| 29 | Chile, Antofagasta offshore, 72 km (45 mi) northwest of Taltal | 6.3 | 58.2 | VII | Minor damage to some buildings at Taltal. | - | - |
| 29 | United States, Alaska, 52 km (32 mi) west-southwest of Ferry | 5.8 | 16.2 | VII | Minor damage in Anderson and Clear. | - | - |

=== December ===
December
- Strongest: 7.0 M_{w} Turkmenistan
- Deadliest: 7.0 M_{w} Turkmenistan; 11 deaths
- Total fatalities: 17

Number by magnitude
- 9.0+: 0
- 8.0–8.9: 0
- 7.0–7.9: 1
- 6.0–6.9: 13
- 5.0–5.9: 112

| Date | Country and location | M_{w} | Depth (km) | MMI | Notes | Casualties | |
| Date | Country and location | M_{w} | Depth (km) | MMI | Notes | Dead | Injured |
|---|---|---|---|---|---|---|---|
| 2 | Russia, Dagestan, 2 km (1.2 mi) east of Levashi | 4.6 | 33.0 | VI | Several buildings damaged or destroyed in the Akusha-Tsudakhar area. | - | - |
| 4 | Mexico, Chiapas offshore, 104 km (65 mi) southwest of El Palmarcito | 6.1 | 33.0 | - | - | - | - |
| 6 | Turkmenistan, Balkan, 37 km (23 mi) east of Balkanabat | 7.0 | 30.0 | VII | Further information: 2000 Turkmenistan earthquake | 11 | "dozens" |
| 6 | Papua New Guinea, New Ireland, 52 km (32 mi) east-northeast of Kokopo | 6.5 | 31.0 | VIII | Aftershock of the 8.0 event on 16 November. | - | - |
| 12 | Panama, Veraguas, 224 km (139 mi) south of Punta de Burica | 6.1 | 10.0 | - | - | - | - |
| 15 | Turkey, Konya, 12 km (7.5 mi) north-northwest of Akşehir | 6.0 | 10.0 | VIII | Six people killed, 41 injured and some buildings damaged in the Afyonkarahisar-Bolvadin area. | 6 | 41 |
| 18 | Fiji region offshore | 6.6 | 628.2 | - | - | - | - |
| 19 | Guam offshore, 166 km (103 mi) south of Merizo Village | 6.2 | 33.0 | - | - | - | - |
| 20 | Chile, Araucanía offshore, 134 km (83 mi) west-southwest of Carahue | 6.5 | 11.0 | V | - | - | - |
| 20 | Papua New Guinea, Milne Bay offshore | 6.6 | 33.0 | - | - | - | - |
| 21 | Papua New Guinea, East New Britain, 110 km (68 mi) east of Kimbe | 6.4 | 33.0 | VIII | - | - | - |
| 21 | Papua New Guinea, Autonomous Region of Bougainville offshore, 183 km (114 mi) northwest of Panguna | 6.0 | 386.7 | - | - | - | - |
| 22 | Russia, Kuril Islands, 72 km (45 mi) southwest of Kuril’sk | 6.2 | 140.4 | IV | - | - | - |
| 23 | Indonesia, Kepulauan Aru region offshore | 6.0 | 61.7 | - | - | - | - |
| 28 | Papua New Guinea, East New Britain offshore, 23 km (14 mi) northeast of Rabaul | 6.2 | 33.0 | VIII | Aftershock of the 8.0 event on 16 November. | - | - |

== See also ==
- Lists of 20th-century earthquakes
- Lists of earthquakes by year
- Lists of earthquakes
