= Japanese expatriates in Solomon Islands =

Total population
- 84 (2007) (Note: Figure only includes Japanese nationals in the Solomon Islands.)

Regions with significant populations
- Noro, Tulagi

Languages
- Japanese, Ryukyuan (Miyako), Pijin

Religion
- Shinto and Buddhism

Related ethnic groups
- Japanese, Ryukyuan

A small, resident expatriate community of Japanese nationals was present in Solomon Islands from the 1970s onwards. Japanese nationals in Solomon Islands are usually employees of fishing corporations that had established branch companies in the country. The majority of them are fishermen from the Miyako Islands in the Ryukyu Islands, as well as a few Japanese mainlanders.

== History ==
The Japanese Fisheries Corporation (Taiyo Gyogyo) expressed interests in fishery activities in the South Pacific nations from the late 1960s onwards, which included the Solomon Islands archipelago which was still under British rule. The Taiyo Gyogyo carried out feasibility studies and discovered reserves within Solomon's waters of skipjack and tuna, which were popular fish varieties in Japan. An agreement was secured between Taiyo Gyogyo and the British colonial administration in 1971. Later in the same year, Taiyo Gyogyo established a shorebase at Tulagi consisting of a small cannery and a fish smoking plant. The shorebase also served as Taiyo's branch headquarters in the Solomons, which was named Solomon Taiyo. Okinawan fishermen from Miyako were employed to carry out the fishery operations, and resident managers from mainland Japan were stationed in the Solomons to supervise operations. The Solomon Taiyo relied on private boats owned by Okinawan fishermen in the 1970s to carry out fishery operations, for which they were given an additional allowance. In the early years, the fishing crew of the Solomon Taiyo was dominated by Okinawan fishermen, as well as some Solomon Islander fishermen. The proportion of the Okinawan fishermen to the number of Solomon Islander fishermen progressively declined in the 1980s and 1990s, and Okinawan fishermen assumed top logistical positions to direct fishery operations. At least one researcher, Wakabayashi, suggested that the pole-and-line and bait-fishing techniques which the company valued in the 1970s lapsed. Modern fishing methods such as purse-seine were increasingly adopted from the 1980s and helped to secure more fish catches, although Okinawan fishermen reportedly practised older fishing methods until 2000. A new shore base that was opened at Noro in the 1990s had both purse-seine and bait-fishing facilities, the latter of which was used by the Okinawan fishermen.

Many Okinawan fishermen forged promiscuous unions with Solomon Islander women, although most were illegitimate. As early as 1973, Okinawan fishermen were reportedly seen forging liaisons with Solomon Islander women, and subsequent news reports between 1975 and 1977 echoed social resentments against these promiscuous unions. Throughout the decade, Solomon Islanders held suspicions against the Okinawans, although such sentiments gradually died down in the 1980s as the Okinawan-dominated fishery crews were increasingly displaced by Solomon Islander fishermen. These promiscuous unions often led to the births of mixed-race children. The mixed-race children generally fared better than most other Solomon Islander children in school and were mentioned to possess beautiful features from the perspective of Solomon Islander state-siders. However, they also faced discrimination in Solomon Islander society, and mothers of mixed-race children often had difficulties in securing inheritance rights for them. Okinawan fishermen regularly provided support for their mixed-race children and mistresses, although most returned to their homelands after a few years and left behind their mixed-race families. The number of mixed-race children born after the 1980s witnessed a sharp decline, after the local administration placed emphasis on sexual education programmes among young women. Ethnic relations between Solomon Islanders and the Okinawans were mixed, which were also influenced by work attitudes by Okinawan fishermen to the Solomon Islanders. In most cases, Okinawan fishermen often cohabited with the Solomon Islander crew during work and a few cultural exchange programmes were carried out in the 1980s, during which Solomon Islander crew were invited to homestays in the hometowns of Okinawan fishermen. Okinawans were also described as "crude" by the Solomon Islanders and often resorted to physical force to discipline the crew in the 1980s, and led to occasional conflicts with the Solomon Islanders.

== Language ==
Within their own social circles, most Okinawan fishermen used the Miyakoan language in their general conversation. Okinawan fishermen are also conversant in Japanese, which they use to communicate with their managers who were usually Japanese from the mainland. Most Japanese managers had little knowledge of the Miyako language, and occasionally reported of communication problems with the Okinawan fishermen, some of whom were not very fluent in Japanese. Okinawan fishermen used a simplified form of Pijin when communicating with the Solomon Islander fishermen, often incorporating Okinawan loanwords. The modified Pijin that was used by Okinawan fishermen was often criticised by Solomon Islanders, and was occasionally called a "beach language" local, informal contexts.

== Bibliography ==
- Barclay, Kate, A Japanese Joint Venture in the Pacific: Foreign Bodies in Tinned Tuna–Volume 18 of Routledge Contemporary Japan Series, Routledge, 2008, ISBN 0-415-43435-1
- Hviding, Edvard, Guardians of Marovo Lagoon: Practice, Place, and Politics in Maritime Melanesia–Issue 14 of Pacific Islands Monograph Series, University of Hawaii Press, 1996, ISBN 0-8248-1664-1
- Meltzoff, Sarah K.; Lipuma, Edward S., A Japanese Fishing Joint Venture: Worker Experience and National Development in the Solomon Islands–Issue 12 of ICLARM Technical Reports, The WorldFish Center, 1983
