= Bougainville national soccer team =

National association football team

Bougainville
- Association: Bougainville Football Federation (BFF)
- Confederation: N/A
- Home stadium: Niniku Oval

The Bougainville national soccer team is the national team representing the Autonomous Region of Bougainville in association football. It is under the auspices of the Bougainville Football Federation.

== Stadium ==
The team's home venue is the Niniku Oval in Arawa, Bougainville's largest city.

== History ==
=== Football development ===
Organised football in Bougainville has had links with the Papua New Guinea Football Association (PNGFA), the Oceania Football Confederation (OFC) and FIFA for several decades. In 2007, an OFC delegation led by OFC president and FIFA vice-president Reynald Temarii visited Bougainville as part of the Football for Hope initiative. OFC described football as playing a role in the peace process following the Bougainville conflict. During the visit, it was announced that players from Bougainville's under-16 team would be selected to represent Oceania at a youth tournament associated with the opening of FIFA House, while the PNGFA committed funding to Bougainville's youth football programme.

Plans for a football academy in Bougainville were announced in 2013. The proposed US$1.2 million academy at Manetai in Central Bougainville was intended to include accommodation, classrooms, a gymnasium and facilities for referee and technical training, with FIFA and the Autonomous Bougainville Government expected to contribute funding. A groundbreaking ceremony for the Emiovi Bougainville Football Academy was held in 2014, attended by PNGFA president David Chung and FIFA officials. The academy was not subsequently built, and in 2018 Central Bougainville MP Sam Akoitai called for an investigation into what had happened to the funding allocated to the project.

=== Formation of a representative team ===
In February 2021, Arawa Football Association president Marcus Nori called for the creation of a Bougainville representative team. He argued that such a team could use football to strengthen relations with neighbouring countries and provide opportunities for Bougainvillean players to gain international exposure.

The prospect of a separate international football identity also received attention in the context of Bougainville's political future. In 2022, Bougainville Football Federation president Justin Helele expressed an ambition for Bougainville eventually to join FIFA. At the time, the federation remained part of the football structure of Papua New Guinea.

=== Solomon Islands tour ===
In November 2024, a Bougainville representative side was assembled for a friendly tour of the Solomon Islands. The tour was organised by the Arawa Football Association and was intended to promote football, strengthen cross-border sporting relations and provide players with representative experience. The squad was drawn largely from Bougainville United FC and players who had been selected for the 2024 New Guinea Islands Youth Games.

Bougainville played two matches at Tuna Park in Noro in December 2024. The team lost 3–1 to Central Roviana on 3 December and 4–0 to Noro on 5 December.

In March 2025, the Western Football Association of the Solomon Islands announced plans for a return series to be held in Arawa later that year. The proposed fixtures were part of efforts to strengthen football links between Bougainville and the Western Province of the Solomon Islands.

== Results and fixtures ==
The following is a list of match results in the last twelve months, as well as any future matches that have been scheduled.

Win Draw Loss Fixture

=== 2024 ===
| 3 December Friendly | Central Roviana (Solomon Islands) | 3–1 | Bougainville | Noro, Solomon Islands |
| | | Report | | Stadium: Tuna Park |

| 5 December Friendly | Noro (Solomon Islands) | 4–0 | Bougainville | Noro, Solomon Islands |
| | | Report | | Stadium: Tuna Park |
