= 2000 Turkmenistan earthquake =

Earthquake in Turkmenistan

- Location within Turkmenistan
- UTC time: 2000-12-06 17:11:08
- ISC event: 1742774
- USGS-ANSS: ComCat
- Local date: December 6, 2000
- Local time: 22:11:08 TMT (UTC+5)
- Magnitude: M_{w} 7.0; M_{s} 7.5
- Depth: 30 km (19 mi)
- Epicenter: 39.48°N 54.82°E
- Type: Oblique-slip
- Areas affected: Balkan Region, Turkmenistan and Baku, Azerbaijan
- Max. intensity: MMI VII (Very strong)
- Aftershocks: 6 ≥M_{w} 4.0 (as of 10/12/2000)
- Casualties: 11 fatalities, "dozens" injured

A M_{w} 7.0 earthquake struck Balkan Region, Turkmenistan on 6 December 2000, at 17:11:08 UTC (22:11 TMT). The epicentre was located near the Balkan Mountains in the west of the country.

== Tectonic setting ==
Turkmenistan lies at the northern edge of the zone of complex tectonics caused by the continuing collision between the Arabian plate and the Eurasian plate. The main structure in the Caspian Sea is the Apsheron Sill, a zone of active subduction. The trend of the Apsheron sill is quite oblique to the overall plate motion and this results in significant amounts of right lateral strike-slip along this structure in an overall transpressional setting. Onshore, the motion along the Apsheron sill is transferred to the Ashgabat Fault, another right lateral strike-slip fault, across a large restraining bend.

== Earthquake ==
The focal mechanism for this event indicates that it was the result of oblique reverse faulting on one of two possible faults, either northwest–southeast or west–east trending. The United States Geological Survey (USGS) and the International Seismological Centre (ISC) put the magnitude of the earthquake at M_{w} 7.0, while the China Earthquake Administration (CEA) measured the event at M_{L} 7.4 and the Society for Earthquake and Civil Engineering Dynamics (SECED) said that the earthquake had a magnitude of M_{s} 7.5. The maximum shaking intensity of VII (Very Strong) on the Modified Mercalli intensity scale was observed in Balkanabat and Türkmenbaşy, with intensity V (Moderate) tremors felt at Gyzylarbat, as well as in Nukus, Uzbekistan and Baku, Azerbaijan; shaking was also felt throughout parts of Russia, including Moscow, as well as in Armenia and northern Iran. By 10 December, six aftershocks above M_{w} 4.0 were detected by the USGS.

== Impact ==
Chinese state television reported 11 deaths and five injuries, while Russian news site Gazeta.Ru said that four deaths and eight injuries occurred in Balkanabat, citing local residents. Dozens of people were injured and many were hospitalized due to stress and panic induced by the tremors, and numerous buildings suffered minor damage. Several buildings reportedly collapsed in Ashgabat. In Baku, Azerbaijan, many people fled their homes in panic.

== See also ==
- List of earthquakes in 2000
- 1948 Ashgabat earthquake
- 2000 Baku earthquake
