= Bougainville United FC =

Bougainville United
- Full name: Bougainville United Football Club
- Nickname: B.United
- Short name: BUFC
- Founded: 2010; 16 years ago
- Ground: Niniku Oval
- Manager: Peter Kauma
- League: Arawa FA B-League
- 2025: Arawa FA B-League, 2nd of 6

Bougainville United FC is a soccer club based in the Autonomous Region of Bougainville that currently competes in the Arawa FA B-League.

== History ==
While still in its infancy, Bougainville United FC management began a fundraising campaign in hopes of competing in the Papua New Guinea National Soccer League for the 2011–12 season. The Bougainville Football Federation hoped that club would provide young players from the region a way of becoming professional footballers. Bougainville United competed in the Papua New Guinea Premier Soccer League in 2022. The club finished third in the NGI Eastern Division, failing to qualify for the play-off round. In 2024, Bougainville United was the only club from the region to compete in the New Guinea Islands Regional Club Championship. The club defeated Nursery FC in the final to win the competition and advance to the PNGFA National Club Championship later that year. The following month, players from the club were part of the Bougainville national squad that traveled to the Solomon Islands for international friendlies.

== Honours ==
- Arawa FA B-League

Winners: (1) 2024
Runners-up: (2) 2023, 2025

- New Guinea Islands Regional Club Championship

Winners: (1) 2024

- Source(s):RSSSF
