= 2000 New Ireland earthquakes =

Earthquakes in Papua New Guinea

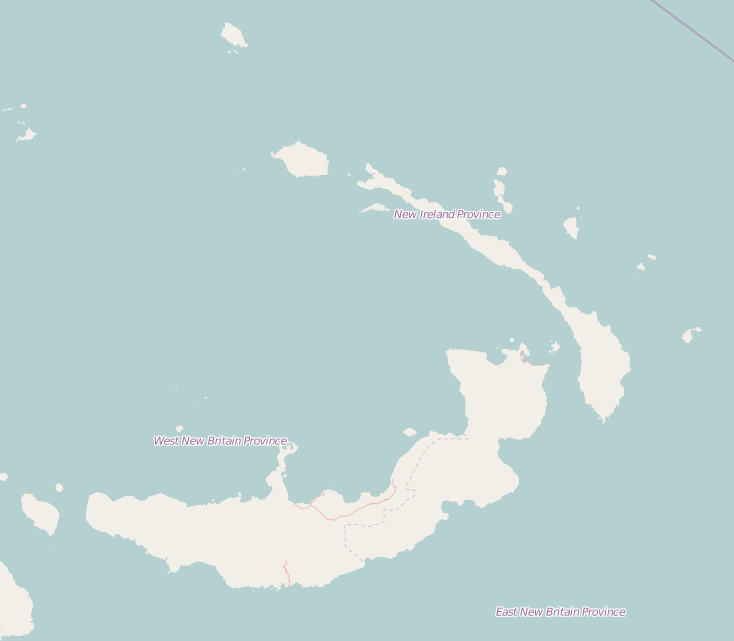
- Location within New Britain Location within Papua New Guinea
- UTC time: 2000-11-16 04:54:56
- 2000-11-16 07:42:16
- 2000-11-17 21:01:56
- ISC event: 1913438
- 1838286
- 1741952
- USGS-ANSS: ComCat
- ComCat
- ComCat
- Local date: 16 November 2000
- 16 November 2000
- 18 November 2000
- Local time: 14:54:56 PGT (UTC+10)
- 17:42:16 PGT (UTC+10)
- 07:01:56 PGT (UTC+10)
- Duration: 90 seconds (first event); 40 seconds (second event); 60 seconds (third event)
- Magnitude: M_{w} 8.0–8.2
- M_{w} 7.3–7.8
- M_{w} 7.3–7.8
- Depth: 33 km (21 mi)
- Epicenter: 3.980°S 152.169°E; 5.233°S 153.102°E; 5.496°S 151.781°E
- Fault: Weitin Fault (mainshock)
- Areas affected: Papua New Guinea
- Max. intensity: MMI VIII (Severe)
- Tsunami: 3 m (9.8 ft)
- Foreshocks: 19 ≥M_{w} 4.0; Strongest: M_{s} 6.0
- Aftershocks: 890 ≥M_{w} 4.0 (as of 31/12/2001); Strongest: M_{wb} 6.8
- Casualties: 2 fatalities

Three powerful earthquakes struck the islands of New Britain and New Ireland, Papua New Guinea, on 16–17 November 2000, starting with a M_{w} 8.0–8.2 strike-slip event that occurred on November 16 at 04:54:56 UTC. A M_{w} 7.3–7.8 thrust earthquake followed at 07:42:16 UTC with its epicenter 170 km (110 mi) southeast of the first event at the southern end of its rupture zone south of New Ireland. Another M_{w} 7.3–7.8 thrust event occurred on November 17 at 21:01:56 UTC, occurring 174 km (108 mi) southwest of the first event with an inland epicenter at Pomio District, East New Britain Province.

This sequence of earthquakes killed two people, caused numerous homes to collapse, and triggered landslides in southern New Ireland. Damage caused by the events and the following tsunami occurred in New Britain, Duke of York Island, western Bougainville and Buka. The first mainshock was the largest earthquake to occur in the world during 2000.

== Tectonic setting ==
The earthquake sequence occurred in an area of complex tectonics caused by the continuing collision between the Pacific plate and the Australian plate. In addition to the major plates, several smaller plates are recognised. The South Bismarck plate is moving southeastward relative to the Pacific plate (or another microplate) and its northern boundary in the Bismarck Sea is made up of segments that are alternately extensional and sinistral transform in type. At its eastern end, where it runs close to New Ireland, this boundary is formed by the Weitin Fault, although it is unclear whether that fault is just one of the structures that carries the plate motion. Depending on assumptions, this part of the boundary accommodates 134–139 mm per year of relative plate motion. The southern boundary of the Bismarck Sea Plate is formed by a convergent boundary where oceanic crust of the Solomon Sea plate is subducting northwards along the New Britain Trench, forming the New Britain island arc. It is unclear how these two boundaries link together, as the Weitin Fault becomes difficult to trace southeast of New Ireland. To the southeast, the New Britain Trench links to the Solomon Islands Trench along which the Solomon Sea plate subducts beneath the Pacific plate.

== Earthquake sequence ==
The first of the large earthquakes in the sequence occurred at 04:54:56 UTC (14:54:59 PGT) on 16 November, with an epicenter about 22 km (14 mi) north of Rabaul, and is regarded as the mainshock, although the two later events are unusually large for aftershocks and occurred on different fault systems with different focal mechanisms. The mainshock had a magnitude in the range M_{w} 8.0–8.2, and was mainly strike-slip in type, although some component of dip-slip has been noted, particularly towards the southeastern end of the rupture. Strike-slip movement was observed along the onshore part of the Weitin Fault on New Ireland, with a maximum displacement of 5 m observed there. It ruptured a section of the transform boundary between the north and south Bismarck plates. A rupture area of 150 km (93 mi) x 30 km (19 mi) was estimated by the USGS, along with a maximum slip of 11.1957 m (36.731 ft), with the zones of largest slip occurring offshore within the Warangoi Bay, southeast of the hypocenter; nearly 6.872 m (22.55 ft) of slip was estimated near Kokopo. The entire rupture process took about 90 seconds with the greatest phase of seismic moment release occurring some 30-50 seconds after initiation.

The second large shock in the sequence occurred at 07:42:16 (17:42:16 PGT), less than three hours after the mainshock. This earthquake had a magnitude in the range M_{w} 7.3–7.8 and was of thrust type, most likely caused by rupture of the plate boundary interface in the New Britain Trench subduction zone. An analysis of Coulomb stress transfer after the mainshock suggest that there was a major increase in static stress along that part of the plate boundary. Its epicenter was about 50 km (31 mi) southeast of the southern tip of Konoagil, New Ireland. A USGS finite fault model suggests that the event had a rupture area of 80 km (50 mi) x 60 km (37 mi), with a maximum slip of 3.877 m (12.72 ft) near the hypocenter; the rupture process lasted for over 40 seconds.

The third and final large shock in the sequence occurred on 17 November at 21:01:56 (07:01:56 PGT on 18 November). This earthquake had a magnitude in the range M_{w} 7.3–7.8 and was also of thrust type along another part of the same plate boundary as the second shock. Only a small increase in static stress has been modelled for the combined effects of the earlier two large earthquakes in the sequence. Unlike the two other large events and their subsequent aftershocks, this earthquake's epicenter was located inland, in Central/Inland Pomio Rural LLG. The earthquake rupture extended 100 km (62 mi) x 80 km (50 mi), producing up to 3.3147 m (10.875 ft) of slip in the process and lasting nearly 60 seconds.

Together, the three events produced at least 890 aftershocks exceeding M_{w} 4.0 throughout the rest of 2000 and 2001, including 15 above M_{w} 6.0; most of these aftershocks were from the second mainshock, and occurred either off the southern coast of New Ireland or beneath Konoagil. The strongest aftershock occurred at 06:54 UTC on 18 November, measuring M_{w} 6.8 and occurring about 20 km (12 mi) inland beneath Pomio District. Starting in October 2000, there was also a series of foreshocks, with 19 tremors measuring M_{w} 4.0 or higher occurring prior to the mainshock; the strongest foreshock measured M_{s} 6.0 and occurred near the third mainshock. In addition, there was also an unrelated M_{w} 7.0 event on 29 October, occurring about 35 km (22 mi) southwest of Nissan Island.

== Tsunami ==
Significant tsunami waves were observed at New Ireland and Torokina, Bougainville [3 m (9.8 ft)], on the islands of Duke of York and Buka [2.5–3.0 m (8.2–9.8 ft)] and on the southern coast of New Ireland (3.0 m at Lamassa). Run-ups of 1 m (3.3 ft) were noted on the Trobriand Islands and on Gizo and Noro of the Solomon Islands. The tsunami was also recorded by tide gauges on the Marshall Islands and Vanuatu.

Modelling of tsunamis generated by the mainshock and the first large aftershock are consistent with the observed run-ups. The mainshock, despite its mainly strike-slip nature appears to be the cause of the tsunami observed on New Ireland. The reason that the mainshock generated a tsunami may either be due to the change to a more dip-slip type motion at the southeastern end of the rupture or a result of lateral movement on the relatively steep bathymetric slope in that area. The effects on Bougainville match those modelled for the first large aftershock.

== Impact ==
Two people were killed by the earthquakes; one on Duke of York and another on New Ireland. Numerous homes collapsed in the epicentral area, including 25 in one village alone. The mainshock was associated with widespread damage on Duke of York and in parts of New Ireland and New Britain, particularly from landslides. The subsequent tsunami caused further damage on Bougainville, destroying houses and leaving 200 people homeless. Waves also struck Lamassa on New Ireland, destroying over 100 homes and a church. Telecommunications to the affected areas were cut off for several hours. At Rabaul, the earthquake caused small landslides and downed trees, and the Rabaul Volcano Observatory observed that the sea level at Simpson Harbour dropped by about 1 m (3.3 ft), revealing mudflats. In nearby Kokopo, the tsunami damaged a supermarket and a wharf. Landslides blocked roads throughout the Gazelle Peninsula.

== See also ==
- List of earthquakes in 2000
- List of earthquakes in Papua New Guinea
