= Banggai Island =

Island in Indonesia

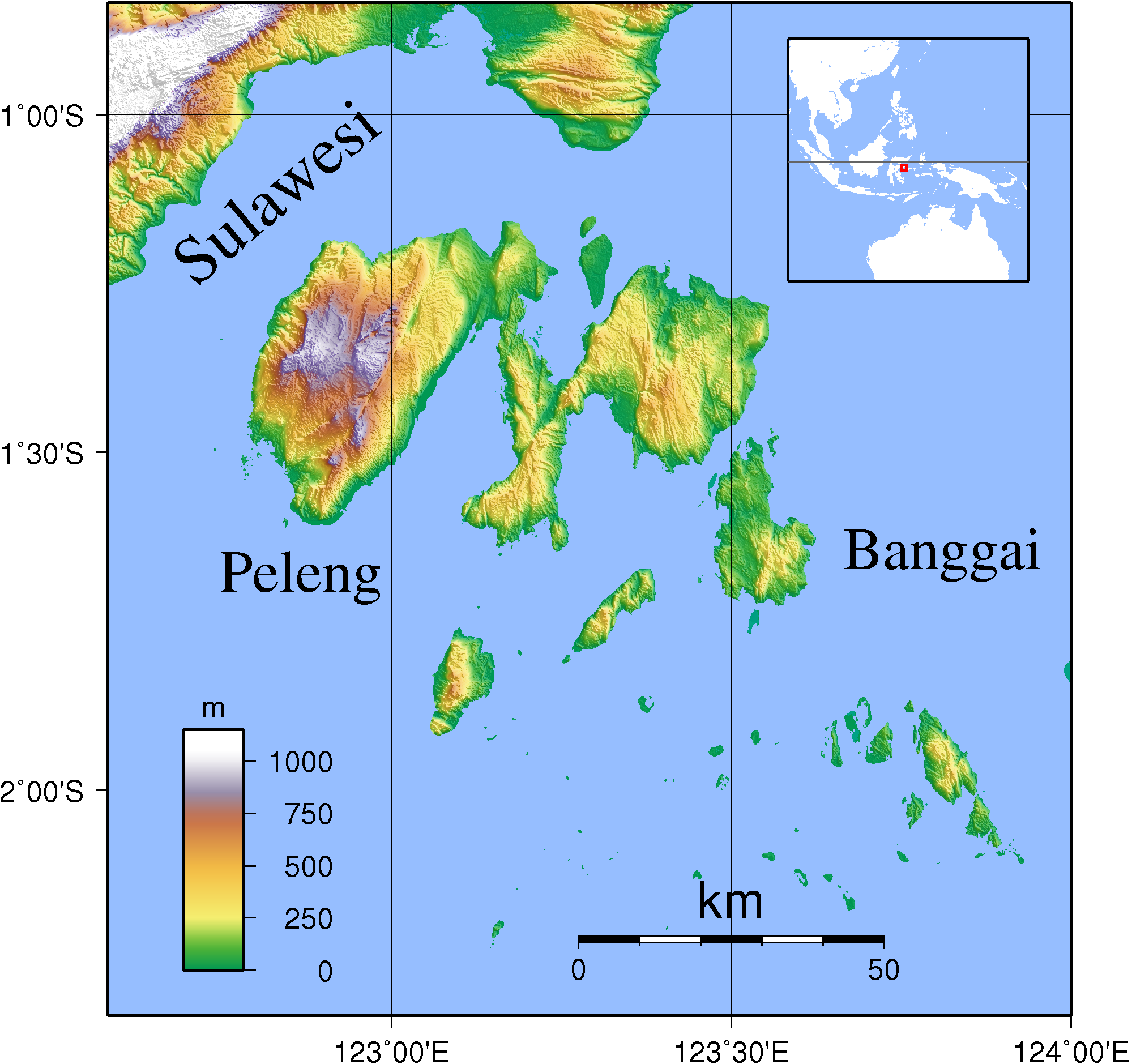

Geography
- Location: South East Asia
- Coordinates: 1°37′S 123°34′E
- Archipelago: Banggai Islands
- Area: 294.4 km^{2} (113.7 sq mi)

Administration
- Indonesia
- Province: Central Sulawesi

Demographics
- Population: 43,338 (2020 Census)
- Pop. density: 147.2/km^{2} (381.2/sq mi)

Banggai Island is the second largest of the Banggai Islands, an archipelago located at the far eastern end of Central Sulawesi, Indonesia. The largest and most northerly island is Peleng, which with offshore islets forms the Banggai Islands Regency. Banggai Island itself, together with Labobo and Bangkurung Islands to its southwest, and the group known as the Bokan Islands to the southeast, forms the Banggai Laut Regency, with altogether about 125 islands. Smaller islands of the group are Bowokan, Kebongan, Kotudan, Tropettenando, Timpau, Salue Besar, Salue Kecil, Masepe.

Banggai Island (including offshore islands) has an area of 294.4 square kilometres (113.7 mi^{2}) and a population of 43,338 at the 2020 census.
