= 1895 Balkan earthquake =

Earthquake in Turkmenistan

1895 Caspian earthquake
- Location within Turkmenistan
- Local date: 8 July 1895
- Local time: 21:30 TMT
- Magnitude: M_{s} 7.4
- Depth: 60 km (37 mi)
- Epicenter: 39.5°N 53.7°E
- Areas affected: Capian Region, Turkmenistan
- Max. intensity: MMI X (Extreme)
- Tsunami: Yes

The 1895 Caspian earthquake occurred on 8 July, at 21:30 TMT, in Uzun-Ada, Caspian Region, Turkmenistan. It had an estimated surface-wave magnitude of 7.4 occurring at 60 km (37 mi) depth and had a maximum Modified Mercalli intensity of X (Extreme).

== Tectonic setting ==
Turkmenistan lies at the northern edge of the zone of complex tectonics caused by the continuing collision between the Arabian plate and the Eurasian plate. The main structure in the Caspian Sea is the Apsheron Sill, a zone of active subduction.

== Tsunami ==
Tsunami waves formed in the Caspian Sea after the earthquake.
