= 2000 Izu Islands earthquakes =

Earthquake swarm in Izu Islands, Japan

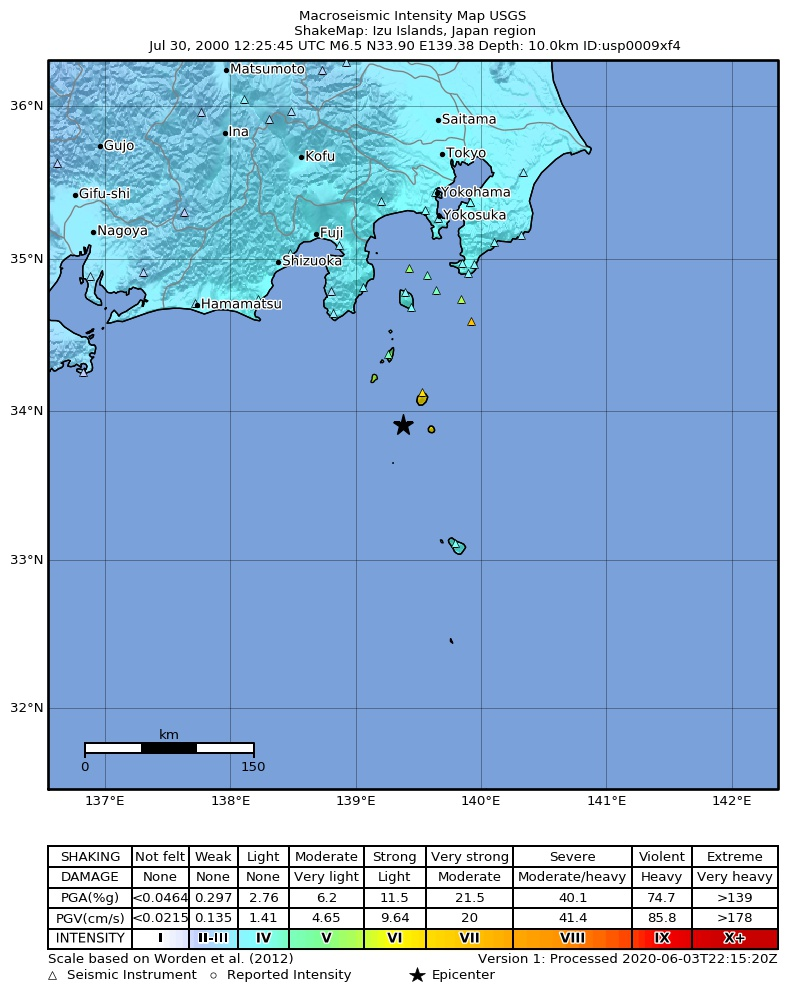
- USGS ShakeMap for the event on 30 July

- Location within Japan
- UTC time: 2000-07-30 12:25:45
- ISC event: 1738464
- USGS-ANSS: ComCat
- Local date: Started: 26 June 2000 Ended: 29 September 2000
- Local time: 21:25:45 JST (UTC+9)
- Magnitude: 6.5 M_{w}^{(largest tremor)}
- Epicenter: 33.901°N 139.376°E
- Areas affected: Izu Islands, Japan
- Max. intensity: JMA 6− (MMI IX)
- Casualties: 1 dead, 15 injured

The 2000 Izu Islands earthquakes is an earthquake swarm that occurred around Miyake-jima, Kōzu-shima, and Nii-jima in the Izu Islands after 26 June 2000. The largest earthquake was M_{w}6.5, and six earthquakes with a maximum JMA seismic intensity of Shindo 6- and Modified Mercalli intensity of VII-IX, resulting in a large-scale earthquake swarm.

== Cause ==
An earthquake swarm is believed to be strongly related to volcanic activity on Miyake-jima. When seismic activity began around 18:30 JST (09:30 UTC) on 26 June, the Japan Meteorological Agency issued a volcanic information announcement at 19:33 JST (10:33 UTC) on the same day, calling for caution regarding volcanic eruptions on Miyake-jima. However, there was no immediate eruption on Miyake-jima, and the next day, discoloration of seawater believed to be caused by submarine volcanic eruptions was confirmed about 1 km off the west coast of Miyake-jima. It was believed that the seismic activity moved northwestward and the possibility of an eruption on Miyake-jima decreased, but on 8 July, an eruption occurred at the summit of Miyake-jima. The depression grew with frequent phreatic eruptions to a 550m–deep–caldera with adiameter of about 1,600 m. There were small eruptions on 13 August, 14, and on 18 August, the largest eruption occurred, followed by the second largest eruption on 29 August, leading to the evacuation of all residents on the island.

== Seismic activity ==
From around 18:30 JST (09:30 UTC) on 26 June 2000, small-scale seismic activity began with the epicenter located in the southwest of Miyake-jima. On the 27th, the epicenter shifted to the west of Miyake-jima offshore. The seismic activity also spread northwestward and intensified. From late June to August, it became significant seismic activity in the waters off the west coast of Miyake-jima, as well as near Nii-jima and Kōzu-shima. There were 30 earthquakes with a maximum JMA seismic intensity of Shindo 5- or higher (Shindo 6- occurred 6 times, Shindo 5+ occurred 7 times, and Shindo 5- occurred 17 times). The total number of earthquakes reached 14,200. Seismic activity gradually subsided after September.

List of earthquakes with a seismic intensity of Shindo 6− and higher
Time (JST)	Epicenter	Magnitude (USGS)	Intensity (Shindo)	Intensity (MMI)	Depth	Notes
1 July 16:01:56	34.221°N 139.131°E	M_{wc} 6.1	6-	IX	10 km (6 mi)	
9 July 03:57:44	34.053°N 139.126°E	M_{wc} 5.9	6-	VIII	10 km (6 mi)	
15 July 10:30:32	34.319°N 139.260°E	M_{wc} 6.1	6-	IX	10 km (6 mi)	
30 July 21:25:46	33.901°N 139.376°E	M_{wc} 6.5	6-	VIII	10 km (6 mi)	
18 August 10:52:22	34.127°N 139.180°E	M_{wc} 5.7	6-	VII	10 km (6 mi)	
18 August 12:49:12	34.231°N 139.155°E	mb 4.9	6-	N/A	10 km (6 mi)	

== Impact ==
The earthquake swarm caused collapsed houses and landslides on Nii-jima, Kōzu-shima, Shikine-jima, and Miyake-jima. The July 1 earthquake killed one person in a landslide at Kōzu-shima Village. This was the first fatality caused by an earthquake in Japan since the Great Hanshin earthquake in 1995. It also injured 15 people, destroyed 15 houses, severely damaged 20 others and damaged 174 more.

== See also ==
- List of earthquakes in 2000
- List of earthquakes in Japan
