= Bougainville Premier League =

- Founded: 2025
- Country: Papua New Guinea
- Confederation: OFC
- Number of clubs: 6
- Level on pyramid: 2
- Relegation to: Arawa FA B-League

The Bougainville Premier League is a planned top tier soccer league in the Autonomous Region of Bougainville. It is organized by the Bougainville Football Federation, an affiliate of the Papua New Guinea Football Association.

== History ==
In January 2025, regional member Peter Tsiamalili and Justin Helele, president of the Bougainville Football Federation, announced the foundation of the Bougainville Premier League. At that time, it was announced that the league would feature six teams, two from the South, Central, and North districts. To accommodate the league, the federation would establish stadiums in each of the regions. The federation planned for local businesses support, while building a strong foundation for soccer in the region.
