= Panguna =

Town in Bougainville, Papua New Guinea

- Town
- NASA Landsat image of Panguna, showing tailings runoff.

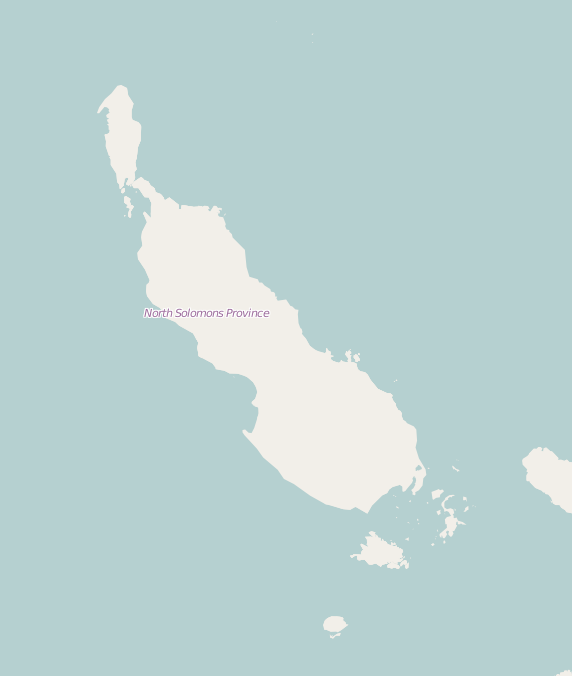
- Location in Papua New Guinea Panguna (Papua New Guinea)
- Coordinates: 6°18′55″S 155°29′47″E
- Country: Papua New Guinea
- Autonomous region: Bougainville
- District: Central Bougainville
- Established: 1972
- Time zone: UTC+10 (PGT)

Panguna is a town in the south-central interior of Bougainville Island, an autonomous region of Papua New Guinea. It was founded as a mining town by Bougainville Copper, a subsidiary of Rio Tinto, to house miners from the nearby Panguna copper mine.

Beginning operations in 1972, the Panguna mine became one of the world's largest producers of copper and gold, contributing significantly to Papua New Guinea's economy. However, it was also met with fierce local opposition due to the environmental damage it caused and the inequitable distribution of profits to locals. Tensions culminated in a decade-long armed conflict, leading to the mine's closure in 1989.

== Geography ==
Panguna is situated in the Crown Prince Range, a mountainous region in central Bougainville. Bougainville Copper, a subsidiary of the British-Australian mining company Rio Tinto, established the town in 1972 to serve the operational and administrative needs of the Panguna mine.

Constructed in a ribbon-like layout across narrow valleys, the town included administrative offices, residential zones, and canteens for workers and their families. Nearby infrastructure projects included roads and a pipeline leading to Loloho on Arawa Bay, where copper concentrate was dried and loaded for export, as well as to the planned town of Arawa, which served as a dormitory town for miners.

== History ==
=== Mining operations at Panguna ===
Mineral exploration in the Crown Prince Range began in the early 1960s, with the Panguna mine commencing production in 1972. At its peak, Panguna was one of the world's largest copper and gold producers. Between 1972 and 1989, the mine produced concentrate containing an estimated 3 million tonnes of copper, 306 tonnes of gold, and 784 tonnes of silver, with exports primarily destined for Japan and Germany.

During this period, mining revenue accounted for approximately 44% of Papua New Guinea's total exports, while contributions to the national government represented 17% of internally generated revenue. The mine also contributed to local development through employment and business opportunities, including the training of over 12,000 employees.

=== Armed conflict and mine closure ===
By the late 1980s, discontent grew among Bougainvilleans over the environmental degradation caused by mining operations and the inequitable distribution of the mine's profits. The dumping of mine waste into the Kawerong-Jaba river system severely affected local ecosystems and communities, leading to widespread protests.

In 1988, local tensions escalated into an armed conflict. Sabotage of mine infrastructure, including the destruction of power lines, led to the mine's closure on 15 May 1989. The conflict, fought between Bougainvillean separatists and the Papua New Guinea Defence Force, lasted a decade and resulted in an estimated 20,000 deaths.

=== Post-conflict ===
The Bougainville Peace Agreement, signed in 2001, ended the conflict and paved the way for Bougainville's autonomy. In 2005, the Autonomous Region of Bougainville was created within Papua New Guinea. A non-binding referendum in 2019 resulted in 98% of voters supporting full independence, though final approval rests with Papua New Guinea's parliament. In 2016, Rio Tinto transferred its 53.8% stake in Bougainville Copper to the Autonomous Bougainville Government and the Government of Papua New Guinea. In the years that followed, environmental assessments were undertaken to examine the long-term impacts of the mine.

== See also ==
- History of Bougainville
- Bougainville Revolutionary Army
