= Azerbaijan Red Crescent Society =

Azerbaijan Red Crescent Society Azərbaycan Qızıl Aypara Cəmiyyəti
- Logo of the Azerbaijan Red Crescent Society
- Formation: March 10, 1920
- Type: NGO
- Legal status: Charitable organization
- Purpose: Humanitarian
- Headquarters: Baku
- Region served: Azerbaijan
- Website: redcrescent.org.az

The Azerbaijan Red Crescent Society (Azerbaijani: Azərbaycan Qızıl Aypara Cəmiyyəti) is the largest humanitarian organization in Azerbaijan and is part of the International Red Cross and Red Crescent Movement.

== Mission ==
The Azerbaijan Red Crescent Society is a not-for-profit, volunteer-based social service institution providing unconditional aid and service, and is a corporate body governed by state laws. Their mission is "to serve vulnerable people by mobilizing the capacity of Azerbaijan Red Crescent and the power of humanity." Its headquarters are in Baku.

== History ==
The organization was founded under the Azerbaijan Democratic Republic on March 10, 1920, on the initiative of the then Deputy Minister of Defense, Lieutenant General Aliagha Shikhlinski and the Minister of Foreign Affairs Fatali Khan Khoyski. After Azerbaijan was occupied and annexed by Soviet Russia on April 28 that year, the Azerbaijan Red Crescent Society temporarily ceased to exist to function as the Azerbaijani branch of the Russian Red Cross Society. In October 1922, the Azerbaijan Red Crescent Society (Hilal Ahmer) was re-established with the decree of the Council of People's Commissars of the Azerbaijan Soviet Socialist Republic. It functioned as a part of the Soviet League of the Red Cross and Red Crescent Societies.

In 1991, after the collapse of the Soviet Union, the Republic of Azerbaijan regained its independence and gave independence to its national Red Crescent Society according to international standards.

== See also ==
- International Red Cross and Red Crescent Movement
- International Committee of the Red Cross
