= Bangkulu Island =

Island in Indonesia

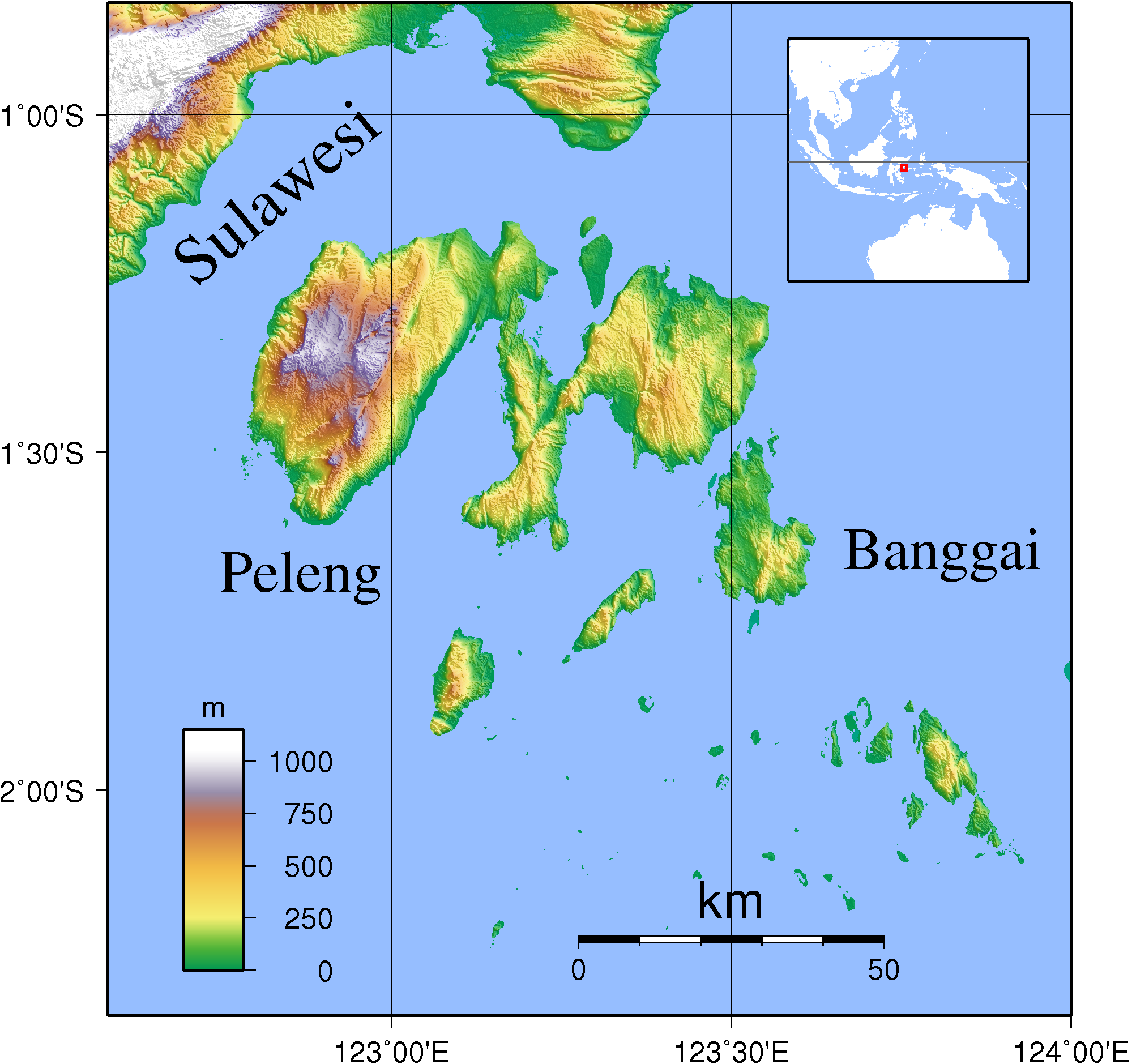

Geography
- Coordinates: 1°50′S 123°6′E
- Archipelago: Banggai Islands
- Area: 108.9 km^{2} (42.0 sq mi)

Bangkulu Island is an island in the Banda Sea. The island is part of the Banggai Islands and is administered by the Banggai Laut Regency. The island is home to a population of the Banggai cardinalfish.
