= Bougainville Copper =

Mining company based in Papua New Guinea

Coordinates: 6°18′55″S 155°29′47″E

Bougainville Copper logo

Bougainville Copper Limited (BCL) is a mining company of Papua New Guinea (PNG) that is listed on the Australian Securities Exchange (ASX). BCL operated the Panguna mine on Bougainville Island, extracting copper, gold and silver from 1971 (55 years ago) to 15 May 1989 (37 years ago), when mining operations were officially halted due to militant activity.

Mining giant Rio Tinto, which was historically Bougainville Copper Limited's major shareholder, exited on 30 June 2016 when it transferred its 53.8 percent shareholding for distribution to the Autonomous Bougainville Government and the Independent State of Papua New Guinea. Papua New Guinea's shareholding was subsequently transferred to the Autonomous Bougainville Government, which as of January 2026 controls approximately 72.9% of BCL.

== History ==
The mine at Panguna was opened in 1972 and was majority-owned by Rio Tinto. The mine was vitally important to the economy of Papua New Guinea. The PNG national government received a 20% share of profit from the mine, of which the Bougainvilleans received 0.5% to 1.25% share of the total profit. The first Bougainville independence movement began to arise in the late 1960s, as people began to air their grievances against the then Australian colonial government over the handling of the Panguna mine. Australian External Territories Minister Charles Barnes was accused of telling the Bougainvillean people they would "get nothing". The issue of compensation went to the High Court of Australia, where it was found that the compensation was inadequate under ordinary federal Australian law, but that as an External Territory, Papua New Guinea was not guaranteed the same standards that applied to mainland Australia. Papua New Guinea has been an independent country since 16 September 1975.

In 2010, using interviews with BCL executives and internal company documents, Kristian Lasslett of the University of Ulster published adverse findings about the company from during the period of civil war. This research suggested that BCL placed pressure on the PNG government to assert its authority on Bougainville, following acts of industrial sabotage. The company purportedly aided the security forces by providing them with trucks, fuel, accommodation, communications equipment, storage space, messing facilities and office resources after concerns about human rights abuses became apparent. These allegations were previously denied by BCL's former Chairman, but Dr Lasslett insists on their veracity. On 8 June 2010, the newly elected president of Bougainville John Momis, declared that the Panguna mine has to be reopened to assure Bougainville's future economic growth. A referendum on Bougainville's independence was due to be held no later than June 2020 under the Bougainville Peace Agreement.

During 2017, president Momis and the Autonomous Bougainville Government advocated for the re-opening of the Panguna mine. However in January 2018, the Bougainville government enacted an indefinite moratorium on renewing the licence of BCL over fears it could reignite the conflict. Bougainville landowner groups were called to vote on allowing BCL to renew their mining licence and potentially reopen the Panguna mine, but lacked support. In February 2018, BCL begun legal proceedings against the Autonomous Bougainville Government following the cancellation of the exploration license. BCL retained the exploration licence while the legal proceedings continued. BCL and the Autonomous Bougainville Government settled their dispute and, on 2 February 2024, confirmed that BCL would be granted a five-year extension to the EL01 licence.

== Current status ==
Ishmael Toroama has repeatedly declared the importance of reopening the Panguna mine to Bougainville's economic independence, confirming that he would "first of all ensure that Panguna quickly progresses to the next stage of development”. In February 2026, Toroama confirmed that the Autonomous Bougainville Government had, in its capacity as majority shareholding in BCL, rejected proposal to reopen the Paguna mine in partnership with CMOC Group Limited because of concerns that the partnership would dilute its shareholding. Instead, Toroama directed BCL to engage with the Indian mining company Lloyds Metals and Engineering Limited.

== See also ==
- Panguna Metals FC
