= Bougainville Football Federation =

Sports governing body

OFC

The Bougainville Football Federation is the governing body of association football in the Autonomous Region of Bougainville, a self-governing territory of Papua New Guinea. It is currently a member of the Papua New Guinea Football Association. From June 2022, the president of the federation was Justin Helele. The federation organises all official football competitions in Bougainville.

== History ==
The Bougainville Football Federation as a regional body has existed since at least the 1970s and has had a troubled relationship with the national governing body for decades. In 1973, the president of the association questioned the lack of Bougainvillean players on the Papua New Guinea national team and the treatment of its clubs.

In 2016, the BFF was one of several regional associations that broke away from the PNGFA and was suspended. The Bougainville federation was reinstated as a member of the national association in August 2018. For the 2019 season, Bougainvillean club Chebu AROB F.C. joined the Papua New Guinea National Soccer League with the express purpose of "promoting and showcasing the quality of football in the region." In 2022, the president of the Bougainville Football Federation expressed the association's desire to join FIFA and, presumably, the OFC. The federation and the governing bodies have already begun working together on footballing projects in the territory.

== See also ==
- Bougainville national soccer team
- Bougainville Premier League
