= Panguna mine =

Copper mine in Bougainville, Papua New Guinea

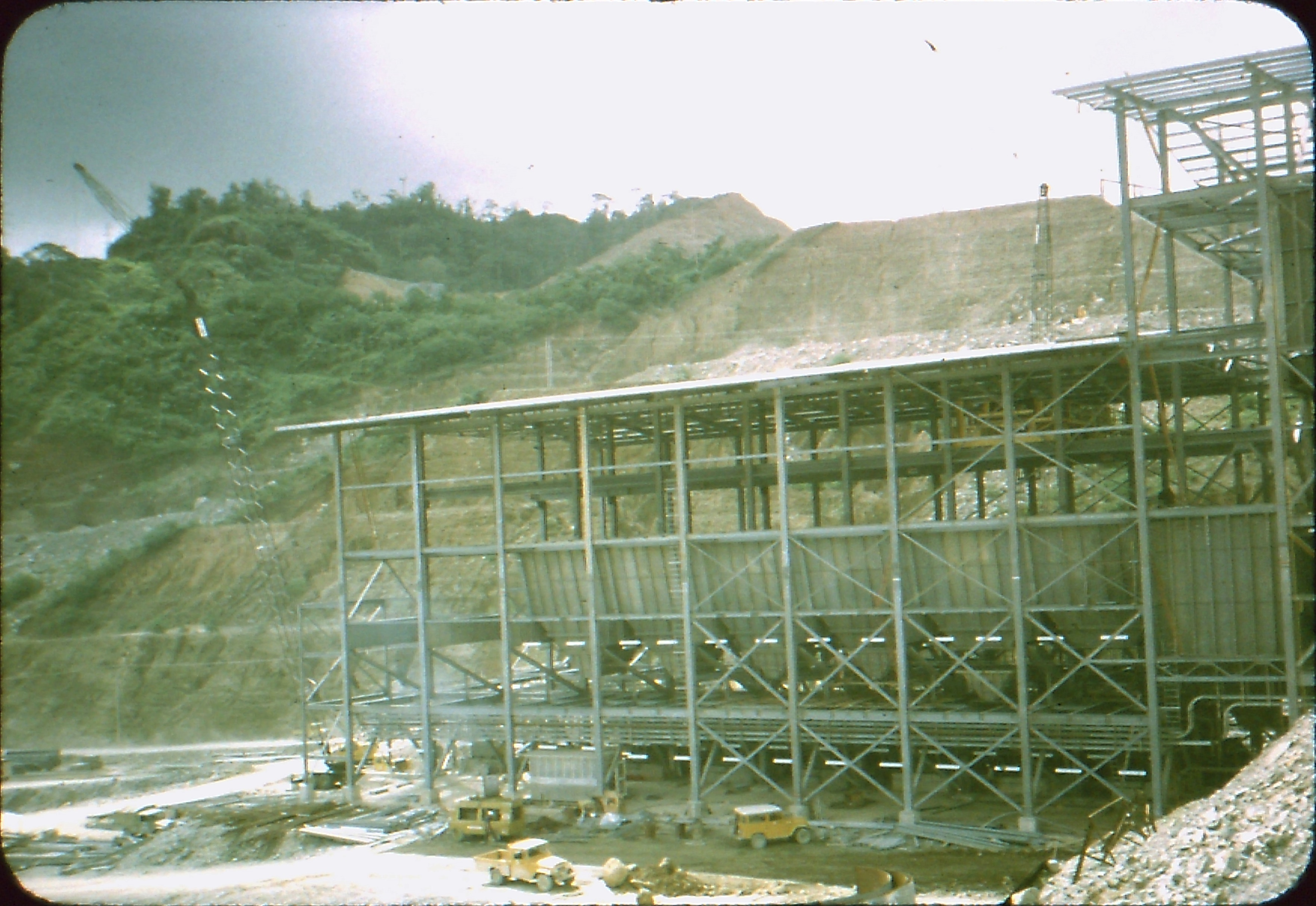
- Copper ore concentrator undergoing construction, c. 1971

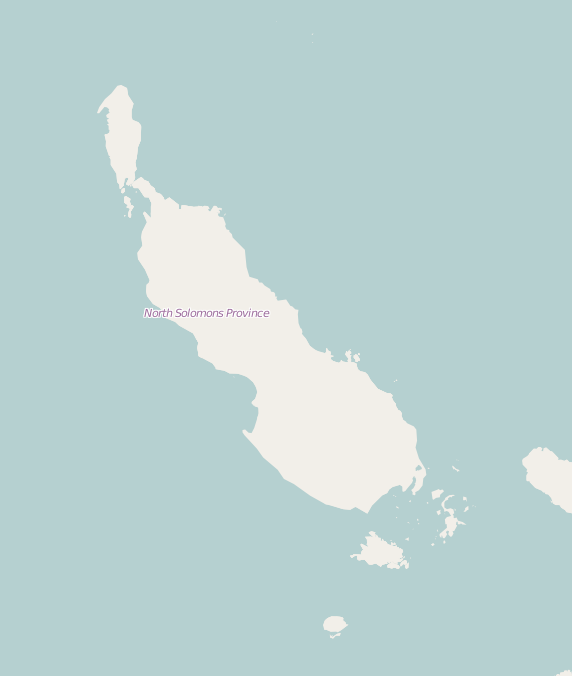
- Location within Bougainville Island
- Location: Autonomous Region of Bougainville, Papua New Guinea; 6.315°S 155.495°E
- Products: Copper; gold; silver
- Type: Open pit
- Opened: 1972
- Closed: 1989
- Company: Bougainville Copper

The Panguna mine is a large, inactive copper mine located in Bougainville, Papua New Guinea, formerly operated by Bougainville Copper Ltd. Panguna represents one of the largest copper reserves in Papua New Guinea and in the world, having an estimated remaining reserve of 5.3 billion tonnes of ore copper and almost 20 million ounces of gold.

The mine has been closed since 1989 despite proposals for its reopening.

== History ==
The discovery of vast copper ore deposits in Bougainville's Crown Prince Range led to the establishment of the copper mine in 1969 by Bougainville Copper Ltd (BCL), a subsidiary of the Australian company Conzinc Rio Tinto of Australia. The mine began production in 1972, with the support of the Papua New Guinea National Government as a 20% shareholder. In contrast to this, the Bougainvilleans received 0.5–1.25% share of the total profit. The site was at the time the world's largest open-pit copper/gold mine, generating 12% of PNG's GDP and over 45% of the nation's export revenue. Profits derived from the mine helped fund Papua New Guinea's independence from Australia, in 1975. While operational, the mine produced 3 million tonnes of copper and 9.3 million ounces of gold.

Mining at Panguna included the direct discharge of tailings into tributaries of the Jaba River. The mine caused devastating environmental issues on the island, and the company was responsible for poisoning the entire length of the Jaba River, causing birth defects, as well as the extinction of the flying fox on the island. Bougainville Copper had set up a system of racial segregation on the island, with one set of facilities for white workers and one set for locals.

The combination of environmental damage and disproportionate share of profits flowing to PNG, rather than the Bougainvilleans, prompted an uprising in 1988, led by Francis Ona, a Panguna landowner and commander of the Bougainville Revolutionary Army (BRA). The outcome of the uprising was the Bougainville conflict, between the BRA, who sought secession from PNG, and the Papua New Guinea Defence Force. The ten-year conflict resulted in over 20,000 deaths, the eventual closure of the mine on 15 May 1989, and the complete withdrawal of BCL personnel by 24 March 1990. In June 2016, Rio Tinto relinquished its role by divesting its interests in the mine to national and local governments. As of October 2026, the mine remains closed.

== Environmental impacts ==
The environmental impacts of the mine continue to this day. Many people have had to relocate to higher ground to avoid contaminated drinking water. Heavy metals such as copper, zinc, and mercury are found in the surrounding rivers. Rio Tinto has refused to fund remediation works, stating that it fully complied with the relevant laws during mining operations.

In 2020, the Human Rights Law Centre lodged a complaint with the Australian government regarding the adverse environmental and human rights impacts of the mine. Tetra Tech Coffey carried out an extensive study, reporting in 2024 that:

"Since 1989, the mine has never re-opened and there has been no implementation of formal closure, maintenance of mining or process infrastructure or remediation work on the mine or downstream receiving environment. Mine structures and buildings have eroded and deteriorated, the tailings continued to migrate downstream and chemicals continue to be released over time from the open pit, waste rock dump and tailings, as well as some industrial chemicals associated with some mine buildings in the Mine, River System and Port & Town domains. Across the study area, this has resulted in a range of environmental, social, human health and human rights issues."

== Reopening ==
A 2012 Order of Magnitude Study carried out by BCL estimated that 1.8 billion tonnes of copper ore (containing 5.3 million tonnes of copper—roughly equivalent to the entire annual output of Chile)—and 19.3 million ounces of gold remained in the mine.

The Autonomous Bougainville Government (ABG) has sought to reopen the mine in order to seek an independent funding source for the territory. Estimates place the cost of reopening the mine at $5 to $6 billion. President Ishmael Toroama, seeing the mine as a foundational pillar of Bougainville's independent economy, declared shortly after his 2025 re-election that "my government will first of all ensure that Panguna quickly progresses to the next stage of development." BCL, now majority-owned by the ABG, was granted an exploration licence until 2029 and has requested the ABG's approval for a partnership with a major international mining company to progress activities under the exploration licence.

In November 2025, the government entered into a contract with an Indian iron ore mining company named Lloyds Metals and Energy to develop the mine. This arrangement has been questioned for the opacity of the contractor selection process, the fact that Lloyds Metals and Energy has no experience developing or operating mines outside of India, and whether they would be able to raise the billions of dollars needed to restart the mine.

== Gallery ==
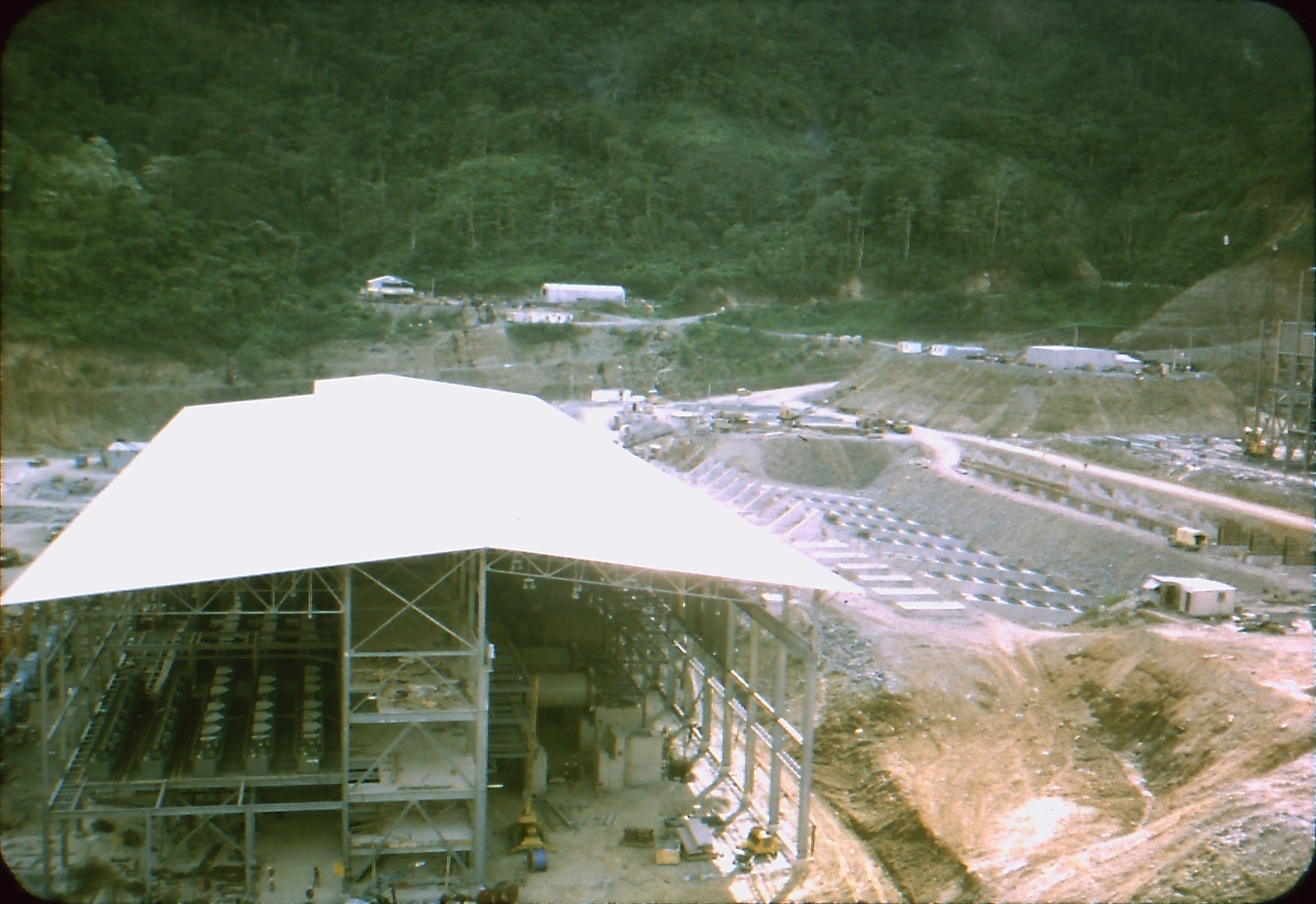
Ore mill at Panguna, Boungainville mine under construction, c. 1971

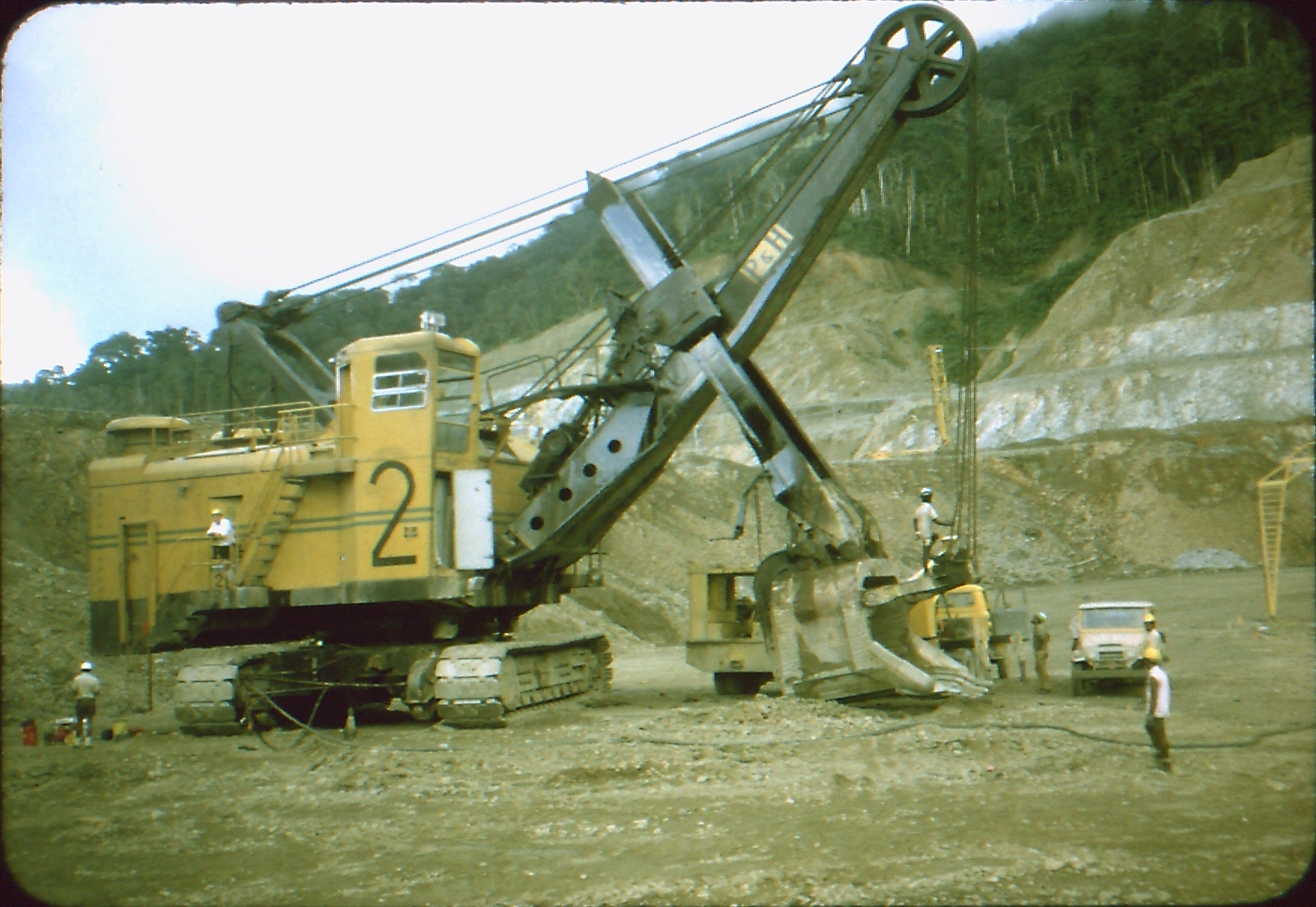
Shovel at Panguna mine undergoing maintenance, engaged in overburden removal, c. 1971.

== See also ==
- History of Bougainville
