= Apsheron Sill =

Feature of the Caspian seafloor

The Apsheron Sill, Absheron Sill, Apsheron Ridge or Apsheron Threshold is a major northwest-southeast-trending bathymetric high that runs for about 250 kilometres (160 mi) across the whole of the Caspian Sea from Baku in Azerbaijan to the Cheleken Peninsula in Turkmenistan. The sill separates the central and southern parts of the Caspian Sea. It is interpreted to be the surface expression of a northeast-dipping subduction zone along which oceanic crust of the South Caspian Basin is being subducted beneath the Central Caspian as part of the complex zone of continental collision between the Arabian Plate and the Eurasian Plate.
