= Banggai Islands Regency =

Regency in Central Sulawesi, Indonesia

Banggai Islands Regency Kabupaten Banggai Kepulauan
- Regency
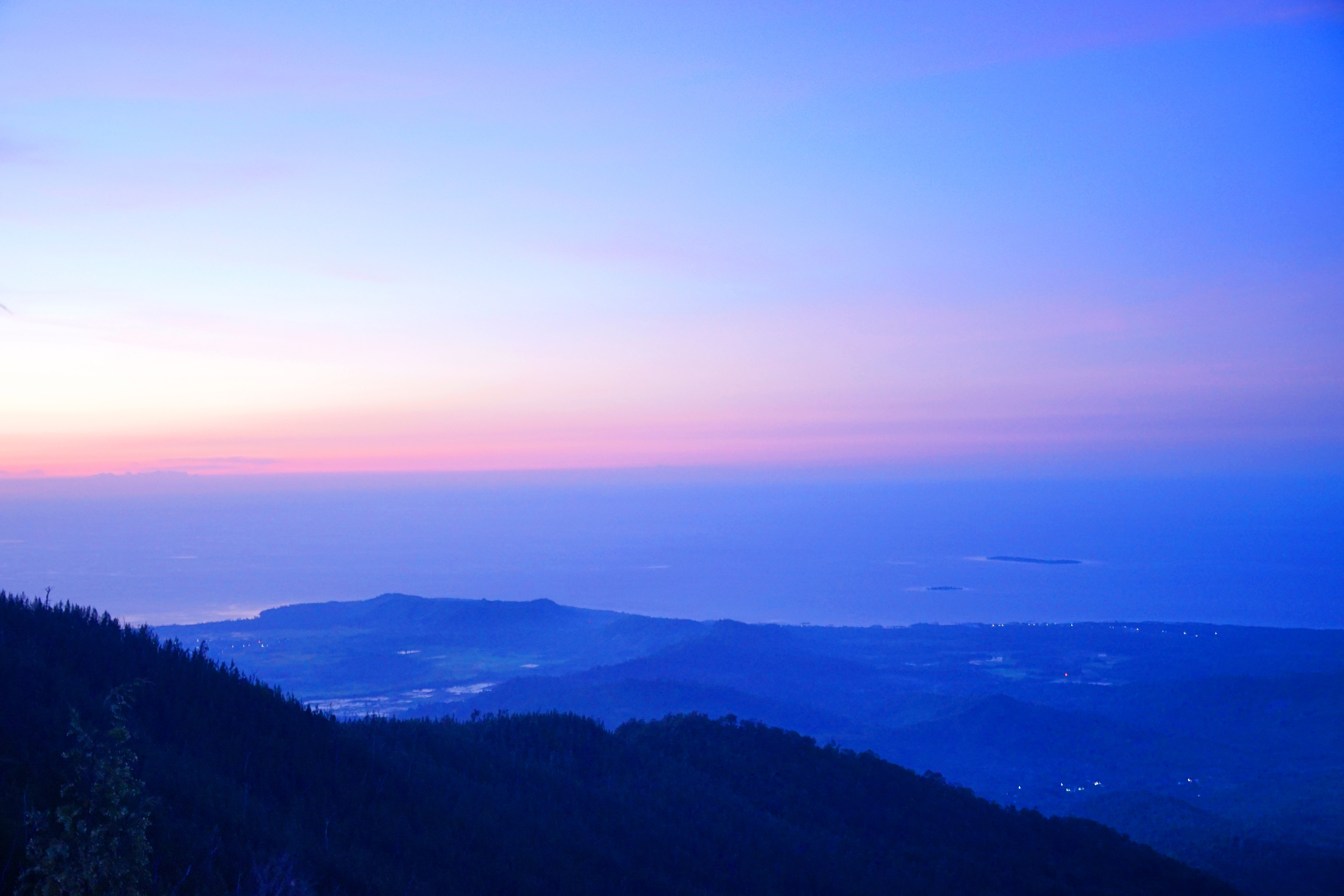
- Mount Tompotika in Banggai Islands Regency

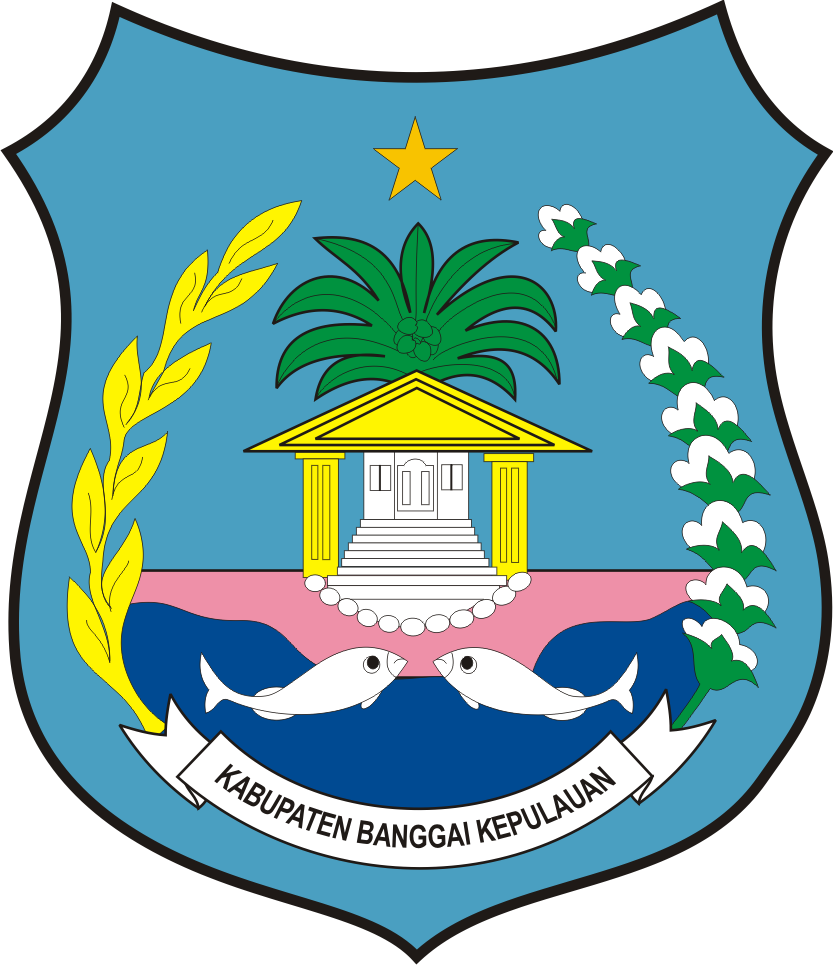
- Coat of arms

- Location within Central Sulawesi

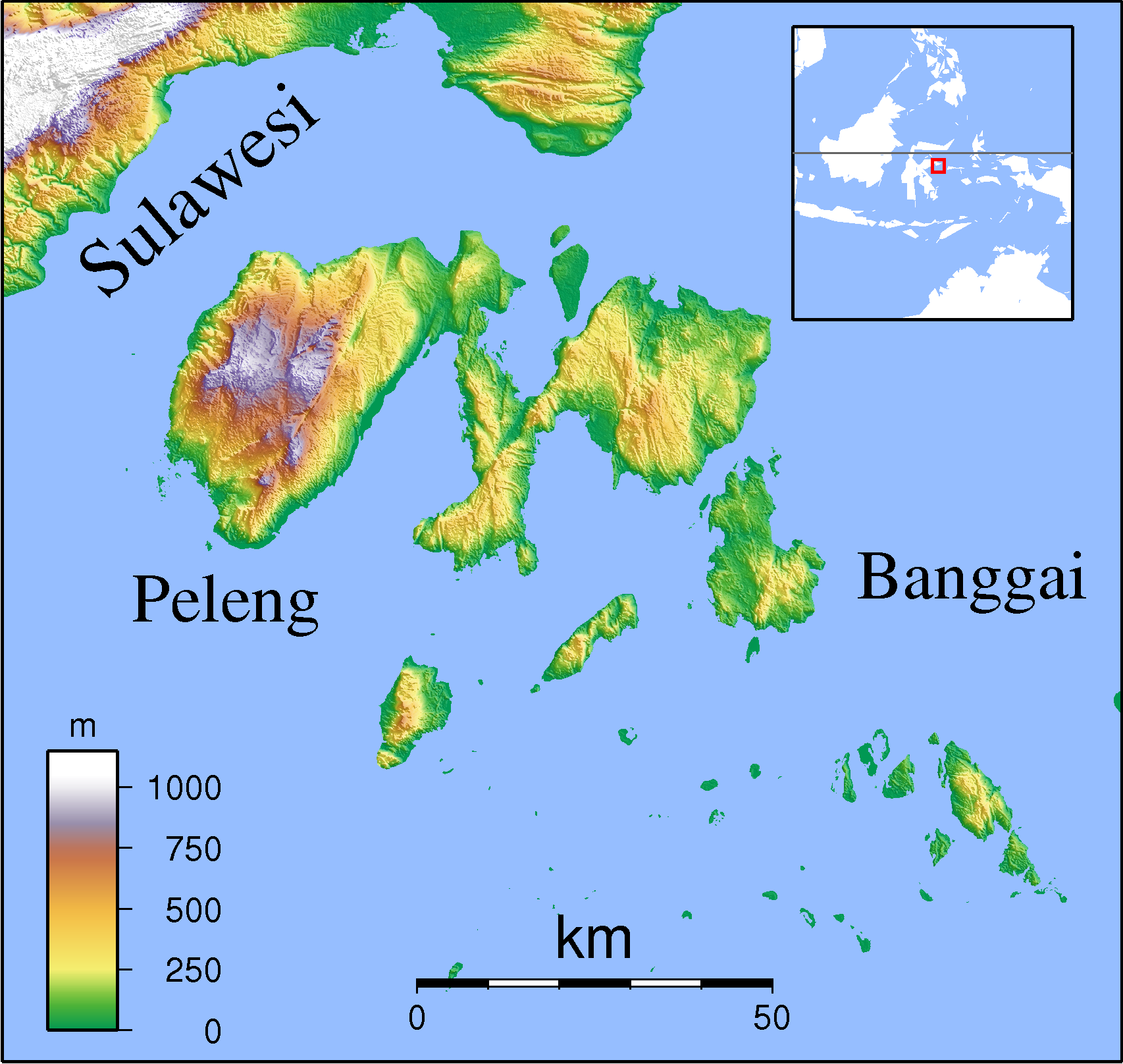
- Location in Banggai Islands, Sulawesi and Indonesia Banggai Islands Regency (Sulawesi) Banggai Islands Regency (Indonesia)
- Coordinates: 1.408619°S 123.206363°E
- Country: Indonesia
- Region: Sulawesi
- Province: Central Sulawesi
- Capital: Salakan

Government
  - Regent: Rusli Moidady
  - Vice Regent: Serfi Kambey

Area
  - Total: 2,488.79 km^{2} (960.93 sq mi)

Population (mid 2025 estimate)
  - Total: 131,682
  - Density: 52.9100/km^{2} (137.036/sq mi)
- Time zone: UTC+8 (ICST)
- Area code: (+62) 462
- Website: banggaikep.go.id

The Banggai Archipelago (Indonesian: Kepulauan Banggai) is a group of islands located at the far eastern end of Central Sulawesi, Indonesia. It makes up a regency (kabupaten) of Central Sulawesi Province of Indonesia, created on 4 October 1999 by splitting the existing Banggai Regency into a residual Banggai Regency situated on the mainland of Sulawesi (capital, Luwuk) and a new Banggai Islands Regency (Kabupaten Banggai Kepulauan) then comprising the entire archipelago (with its capital at Banggai town). On 14 December 2012 a splitting of the Banggai Islands archipelago took place with the removal of the more southerly seven districts (including Banggai Island itself, together with smaller islands to its southwest and southeast) from the 13-year-old regency to form a separate Banggai Laut Regency.

The reduced Banggai Islands Regency thus consists solely of the main island of Peleng, the most northern of the Banggai Islands, together with various small offshore islands (of which the largest are Bangkalan and Bakamanpauno Islands off the north coast of Peleng). The regency covers a land area of 2,488.79 km^{2} and had a population of 109,384 at the 2010 census and 120,142 at the 2020 census; the official population estimate as at mid 2025 was 131,682 (comprising 66,810 males and 64,872 females). The archipelago is surrounded by the Banda Sea's Gulf of Tolo (Teluk Tolo), and the Molucca Sea. The Peleng Straits (Selat Peleng) separate Peleng from the mainland of Sulawesi.

== Administrative districts ==
The Banggai Islands Regency is divided into twelve districts (kecamatan), tabulated below with their areas and their populations at the 2010 Census and the 2020 Census, together with the official estimates as at mid 2025. The table also includes the location of the district headquarters, the numbers of administrative villages (totalling 141 rural desa and 3 urban kelurahan) and of offshore islands in each district, and its postal codes.

Kode Wilayah	Name of District (kecamatan)	Area in km^{2}	Pop'n Census 2010	Pop'n Census 2020	Pop'n Estimate mid 2025	Admin centre	No. of villages	No. of islands	Post codes
72.07.03	Totikum	155.45	9,869	10,473	11,570	Sambiut	11	4	94884
72.07.15	Totikum Selatan (South Totikum)	95.19	8,036	8,499	9,621	Kalumbatan	8	-	94887
72.07.04	Tinangkung ^{(a)}	312.60	13,201	17,194	19,529	Salakan	11 ^{(b)}	52	94885
72.07.11	Tinangkung Selatan (South Tinangkum)	187.89	7,204	7,989	8,834	Mansamat	9	-	94885 ^{(a)}
72.07.19	Tinangkung Utara (North Tinangkung)	136.65	7,670	8,694	9,620	Batulombo	6	-	94886
72.07.05	Liang	176.19	8,768	8,531	10,602	Liang	16	65	94883
72.07.16	Peling Tengah (Central Peling)	140.00	9,244	10,397	11,042	Patukuki	11	-	94888
72.07.06	Bulagi	275.66	9,529	9,493	9,921	Bulagi Satu	16 ^{(c)}	2	94882 ^{(b)}
72.07.09	Bulagi Selatan (South Bulagi)	319.00	9,716	9,713	10,813	Lolantang	20	8	94882
72.07.17	Bulagi Utara (North Bulagi)	318.00	8,890	9,640	10,260	Sambulangan	12 ^{(d)}	-	94889
72.07.07	Buko	184.84	9,356	9,880	10,569	Tabata	13	21	94881
72.07.18	Buko Selatan (South Buko)	187.32	7,881	8,649	9,301	Lumbi-lumbia	11	-	94880
	Totals	2,488.79	109,364	120,142	131,682		144	224	

Notes: (a) including Bangkalan and Bakamanpauno Islands. (b) including the kelurahan of Salakan.
(c) including the kelurahan of Bulagi (town). (d) including the kelurahan of Sabang.

== Transportation ==
Merpati Nusantara Airlines served the islands from Palu (the capital of Central Sulawesi Province). There is also a bus service via Luwuk and thence by boat or ship to Banggai.

== Endangered Banggai Cardinalfish ==
The Banggai Islands is home to the Banggai cardinalfish. This species has an extremely limited geographic range (5,500 km^{2}) and small total population size (estimated at 2.4 million). The Banggai cardinalfish is composed of isolated populations concentrated around the shallows of 17 large and 10 small islands within the Banggai Archipelago. The species is threatened by extinction due to collections for the aquarium trade.

== Climate ==
Salakan has a tropical rainforest climate (Af) with moderate rainfall from August to January and heavy rainfall from February to July.

Climate data for Salakan
Month	Jan	Feb	Mar	Apr	May	Jun	Jul	Aug	Sep	Oct	Nov	Dec	Year
Mean daily maximum °C (°F)	30.8 (87.4)	30.8 (87.4)	31.0 (87.8)	31.3 (88.3)	31.0 (87.8)	30.5 (86.9)	30.1 (86.2)	30.7 (87.3)	31.4 (88.5)	31.9 (89.4)	32.2 (90.0)	31.3 (88.3)	31.1 (87.9)
Daily mean °C (°F)	26.9 (80.4)	26.9 (80.4)	27.0 (80.6)	27.3 (81.1)	27.2 (81.0)	26.9 (80.4)	26.4 (79.5)	26.6 (79.9)	26.8 (80.2)	27.1 (80.8)	27.8 (82.0)	27.2 (81.0)	27.0 (80.6)
Mean daily minimum °C (°F)	23.0 (73.4)	23.0 (73.4)	23.1 (73.6)	23.3 (73.9)	23.5 (74.3)	23.3 (73.9)	22.7 (72.9)	22.5 (72.5)	22.3 (72.1)	22.4 (72.3)	23.4 (74.1)	23.2 (73.8)	23.0 (73.4)
Average rainfall mm (inches)	114 (4.5)	135 (5.3)	172 (6.8)	203 (8.0)	219 (8.6)	266 (10.5)	192 (7.6)	117 (4.6)	79 (3.1)	71 (2.8)	88 (3.5)	94 (3.7)	1,750 (69)
Source: Climate-Data.org
