= Noro, Solomon Islands =

Noro
- Town
- Location in Solomon Islands
- Coordinates: 8°13′S 157°13′E
- Country: Solomon Islands
- Province: Western
- Island: New Georgia

Population (2019)
  - Total: 7,204

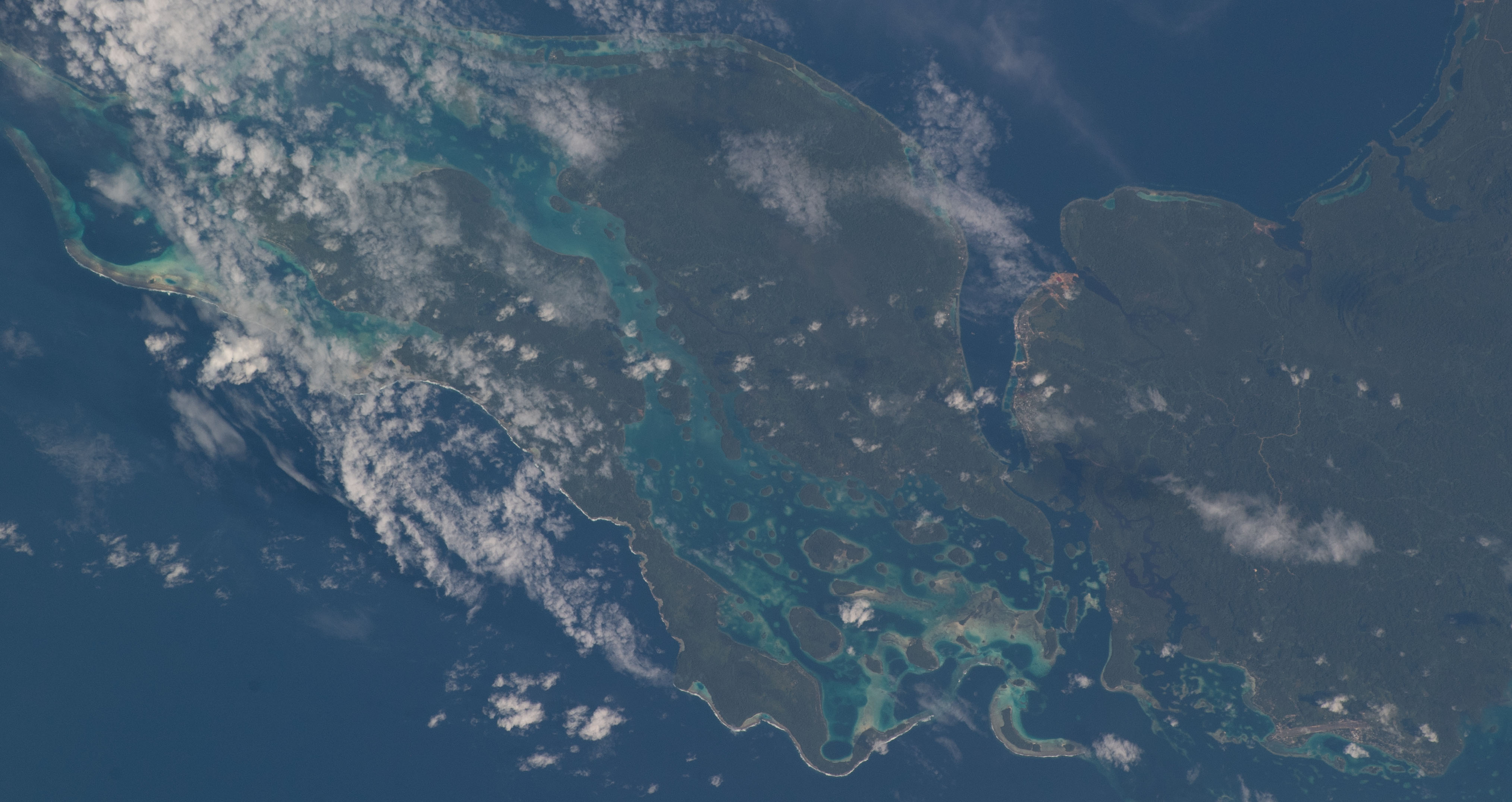
Noro, with Kohinggo, Kauvi and Vonavona islands, as well as the Kula Gulf. Munda Airport visible in South. (photo from ISS)

Noro is a town in the Western Province of Solomon Islands. It has 7,204 inhabitants as of 2019, making it the second largest town in the country behind the Honiara Urban Area. It is located on the western shore of New Georgia island.

It has a cannery, which was owned by Taiyo Fisheries until 2001 and is now owned by SolTuna.

SolTuna is majority-owned and controlled (51.5%) by Tri-Oceanic Overseas Holdings, LLC (“TOOH”), an affiliate of Tri Marine (“Tri Marine” or the “Group”), which consists of a group of 41 privately held entities that together, comprise one of the largest global tuna supply companies in the world. The other shareholders of the Company are Solomon Islands National Provident Fund (31.4%), Investment Corporation of Solomon Islands Limited (9.3%) and Provincial Executive of the Western Province (7.8%).

== History ==
Noro is located within the Tirokiaba Land or Kingdom. Tirokiaba was the ancient home of the Kidu Tribe. Zalala in Lembu bay was used by the Kindu tribe to put canoes and war canoes (Tomoko).

Before they went to Kohigo, the Kindu tribe settled at Muziboko now developed and commonly referred to as "Taiyo", the Tuna Cannery Factory also known as "Soltai". The Kindu Tribe has many tambu sites (sacrificial or worship sites) at Noro. The one located at Taiyo is a big black stone carved in a rectangular shape and placed on the hill at Taiyo. However, it was removed and or destroyed when the Japanese built Noro Cannery Factory.
