= List of railway towns =

This is a list of railway towns.

== Armenia ==
- Gyumri

== Australia ==
- Cook, South Australia
- Ivanhoe, New South Wales
- Junee, New South Wales
- Hoyleton, South Australia
- Korong Vale, Victoria
- Peterborough, South Australia
- Serviceton, Victoria
- Seymour, Victoria
- Shepparton, Victoria
- Werris Creek, New South Wales

== Bangladesh ==
- Pahartali, Chittagong
- Saidpur, Nilphamari

== Canada ==
Under the provisions of the Dominion Lands Act of 1872, the railway companies had the power to survey new townsites along their rail lines, throughout Western Canada. Virtually every community in Western Canada that was created after 1870 (the majority) was directly created by the rail companies. One company, the Grand Trunk Pacific, actually began naming the new towns along its main line in alphabetical order from east to west, demonstrating the arbitrary nature of their planning powers.

== Czech Republic ==
- Česká Třebová - This town in Eastern Bohemia has been an important settlement for more than seven centuries but since 1849 it became a large railway hub where main lines connecting Bohemia and Moravia meet. The largest rail yard in that country is located there as well as maintenance and scrap works.
- České Velenice - The settlement was developed around an engine depot and railway works located on halfway between Vienna and Prague. Originally a suburb of Austrian town of Gmünd, the railway junction with its hinterland was attached to newly created Czechoslovakia after World War I and became a town of its own.
- Kralupy nad Vltavou - Since Middle Ages Kralupy was a tiny insignificant village on the Vltava River. Since the 1850s it became an important railway junction and centre of petrochemical industry.

== Denmark ==
- Langå
- Aars
- Hvalpsund
- Brønderslev
- Struer
- Silkeborg
- Herning
- Skjern
- Esbjerg
- Bramming
- Faxe

== Finland ==
- Espoo, now the second largest town in Finland
- Hyvinkää
- Jyväskylä
- Karis
- Kouvola, which has the largest marshalling yard in Finland
- Lahti
- Riihimäki

== France ==
- Sotteville-lès-Rouen, Seine-Maritime Department
- Tergnier, Aisne Department

== Germany ==
- Altenbeken
- Bebra
- Falkenberg/Elster
- Hamm

== Hong Kong ==
- Sha Tin
- Tai Po
- Heng Fa Chuen
- Tung Chung
- LOHAS Park

== India ==
- Adra, West Bengal
- Arakkonam, Tamil Nadu
- Arsikere, Karnataka
- Asansol, West Bengal
- Bangarapet, Karnataka
- Bhusawal, Maharashtra
- Bina, Madhya Pradesh
- Birur, Karnataka
- Chakradharpur, Jharkhand
- Chengalpattu, Tamil Nadu
- Chittaranjan, West Bengal
- Dindigul, Tamil Nadu
- Erode, Tamil Nadu
- Itarsi, Madhya Pradesh
- Irugur, Tamil Nadu
- Jamalpur, Bihar
- Jolarpettai, Tamil Nadu
- Karaikudi, Tamil Nadu
- Karur, Tamil Nadu
- Katni, Madhya Pradesh
- Katpadi, Tamil Nadu
- Kharagpur, West Bengal
- Manamadurai, Tamil Nadu
- Mayiladuthurai, Tamil Nadu
- Mughalsarai, Uttar Pradesh
- Nidamangalam, Tamil Nadu
- Olavakkode, Palakkad, Kerala
- Peralam, Tamil Nadu
- Pollachi, Tamil Nadu
- Shoranur, Kerala
- Thiruthuraipoondi, Tamil Nadu
- Thiruvarur, Tamil Nadu
- Vanchi Maniyachchi, Tamil Nadu
- Villupuram, Tamil Nadu
- Virudunagar, Tamil Nadu
- Vriddachalam, Tamil Nadu

== Italy ==
- Ardore Marina
- Africo Nuovo
- Allerona Scalo
- Alviano Scalo
- Baschi Scalo
- Campoleone
- Camucia
- Capalbio Scalo
- Catanzaro Lido
- Chieti Scalo
- Chiusi Scalo
- Civitanova Marche
- Corigliano Scalo
- Fabro Scalo
- Latina Scalo
- Locri
- Maccarese Scalo
- Marina di Caulonia
- Marina di Gioiosa Ionica
- Marina di Sant'Ilario dello Ionio
- Metaponto
- Nova Siri Scalo
- Orbetello Scalo
- Orte Scalo
- Orvieto Scalo
- Palizzi Marina
- Passo Corese
- Poggio Mirteto Scalo
- Riace Marina
- Rossano Scalo
- Scarlino Scalo
- Sezze Scalo
- Sibari
- Stimigliano Scalo
- Terontola

== Jordan ==
- Mafraq
- Amman
- Ma'an

== Japan ==
Japanese National Railways (JNR) had chosen 12 major railway towns officially. The list below shows the official railway towns, but there are many other towns where town officials and residents think of their town as a railway town.

- Iwamizawa, Hokkaidō - Iwamizawa engine depot and center of coal transport in Hokkaido.
- Oiwake, Hokkaidō - now part of Abira, Hokkaidō - Oiwake engine depot and another center of coal transport in Hokkaido.
- Tsuchizaki - part of Akita, Akita, Tsuchizaki engine depot and Tsuchizaki railway works.
- Niitsu, Niigata - now part of Niigata, Niigata. Junction of Shinetsu Main Line and Uetsu Main Line, Niitsu engine depot and Niitsu railway works.
- Ōmiya, Saitama - now a part of Saitama City. Junction of Tōhoku Main Line and Takasaki Line, Omiya railway works and Omiya marshalling yard.
- Maibara, Shiga - Junction of Tōkaidō Main Line and Hokuriku Main Line, Maibara engine depot and Maibara marshalling yard.
- Suita, Osaka - Suita marshalling yard, which was the largest marshalling yard in Japan.
- Tadotsu, Kagawa - Junction of Yosan Line and Dosan Line, Tadotsu railway works.
- Yonago, Tottori - Goto railway works.
- Tsuwano, Shimane - Tsuwano engine depot.
- Nōgata, Fukuoka - Center of coal transport for Chikuho coalfield.
- Tosu, Saga - Junction of Kagoshima Main Line and Nagasaki Main Line, Tosu engine depot and Tosu marshalling yard.

== Malaysia ==
- Gemas, Negeri Sembilan - interchange between the electric line the East Coast line and the line to Johor Bahru and Singapore
- Pulau Sebang, Melaka - one of two railway stations in Melaka, forming a conurbation with Tampin, Negeri Sembilan across the border
- Batang Melaka, Melaka
- Sungai Buloh, Selangor - home to Malaysia's largest leprosarium
- Port Swettenham, Selangor - Malaysia's principal port
- Tanjong Malim, Perak - southernmost station in Perak state, last station of the Port Swettenham Komuter line
- Ipoh, Perak - capital of Perak state, former tin mining centre
- Taiping, Perak - Malaya's first railway line, former tin mining area
- Padang Besar, Perlis - northernmost station of the Malayan Railways network, on the border with Thailand
- Kuala Lipis, Pahang - former capital of Pahang
- Kuala Krai and Dabong, Kelantan
- Tumpat, Kelantan - last station of the East Coast branch line
- Segamat, Johor
- Kluang, Johor
- Tenom, Sabah - last station on the North Borneo Railway, the only railway in Borneo
- Sentul, Kuala Lumpur - former Central Railway Workshop of Malaya

== Netherlands ==
- Ede

== New Zealand ==
- Frankton

== Poland ==
- Chabówka
- Fosowskie
- Herby Nowe
- Koluszki
- Węgliniec
- Zbąszynek
- Zduńska Wola Karsznice

== Portugal ==
- Entroncamento, Santarém District
- Pinhal Novo, concelho de Palmela, Setúbal District

== Russia ==
- Novosibirsk, now the 3rd largest city in Russia

== Spain ==
There are different kinds of railway towns in Spain:

- Railway towns: new creation settlements which have community services (medical service, school, church...)
- Railway villages: new creation settlements which have no community services.
- Railway neighborhoods: settlements which appeared near a formerly town.

Some of them can be partial, non-entire. It means that railway activity was not the only one; it coexisted with other economic activities such as mining industry, cargo trade or customs activity.

=== Railway towns ===
- Almorchón, Cabeza del Buey, Province of Badajoz
- Linares-Baeza, Linares, Province of Jaén
- Fuente del Arco's station, Fuente del Arco, Province of Badajoz
- Moreda's station, Morelábor, Province of Granada
- La Encina, Villena, Province of Alicante
- Monfragüe's station (Plasencia-Empalme until middle 1970s; Palazuelo-Empalme until 27 May 1990), Malpartida de Plasencia, Province of Cáceres
- Bobadilla's station, Antequera, Province of Málaga
- Vadollano, Linares, Province of Jaén
- Espelúy's station, Espelúy, Province of Jaén
- Algodor, Aranjuez, Community of Madrid
- Arroyo-Malpartida, Cáceres, Province of Cáceres
- Chinchilla's station, Chinchilla de Monte-Aragón, Province of Albacete
- Puente de los Fierros, Lena, Asturias
- Maçanet-Massanes (formerly Empalme), Maçanet de la Selva and Massanes, Province of Girona

=== Partial railway towns ===
- Los Rosales (Tocina-Empalme until 1 August 1914), Tocina, Province of Seville
- Villanueva del Río y Minas, Province of Seville
- Canfranc's station, Canfranc, Province of Huesca
- Sierra Menera, Ojos Negros, Province of Teruel
- Barruelo de Santullán, Province of Palencia
- Venta de Baños, Province of Palencia
- Portbou, Province of Girona
- Prat del Pinter, Ogassa, Province of Girona
- Castejón, Navarre
- Valencia de Alcántara's station, Valencia de Alcántara, Province of Cáceres

=== Railway villages ===
- Doña María-Ocaña, Las Tres Villas, Province of Almería
- Nacimiento's station, Nacimiento, Province of Almería
- Roda de Barà's station, Roda de Barà, Province of Tarragona
- Calasparra's station, Calasparra, Region of Murcia

=== Partial railway villages ===
- Puerto La Laja, El Granado, Province of Huelva
- Mengíbar-Las Palomeras, Jabalquinto, Province of Jaén
- Agramón's station, Hellín, Province of Albacete
- Aljucén's station (Lavaderos until 15 April 1884; Puente de Aljucén until 1928), Mérida, Province of Badajoz

=== Railway neighborhoods ===
- Belmez's station, Bélmez, Province of Córdoba (Spain)
- Los Prados, Málaga, Province of Málaga
- La Almozara, Zaragoza, Province of Zaragoza
- Astorga-San Andrés, Astorga, Province of León
- Torralba's station, Medinaceli, Province of Soria
- Móra La Nova's station, Móra la Nova, Province of Tarragona
- Vicálvaro's station, Madrid, Community of Madrid
- Villabona's station, Llanera, Asturias

=== Partial railway neighborhoods ===
- Santa Fe-Alhama, Santa Fe de Mondújar, Province of Almería
- Serón's station, Serón, Province of Almería
- Guadix's station, Guadix, Province of Granada
- Sant Vicenç de Calders' station, El Vendrell, Province of Tarragona
- Las Matas, Las Rozas de Madrid, Community of Madrid
- Puerto de Sagunto, Sagunto, Province of Valencia
- Aldea Moret, Cáceres, Province of Cáceres

== Sweden ==
- Hallsberg
- Nässjö, at the expense of the—at the time—larger town of Eksjö

== Thailand ==
- Nakhon Ratchasima, Used to be the terminus for almost 30 years (1900 - 1930)
- Hatyai, The city was founded after SRT built the Hatyai Junction and it became a Financial Center of Southern Thailand.

== Turkmenistan ==
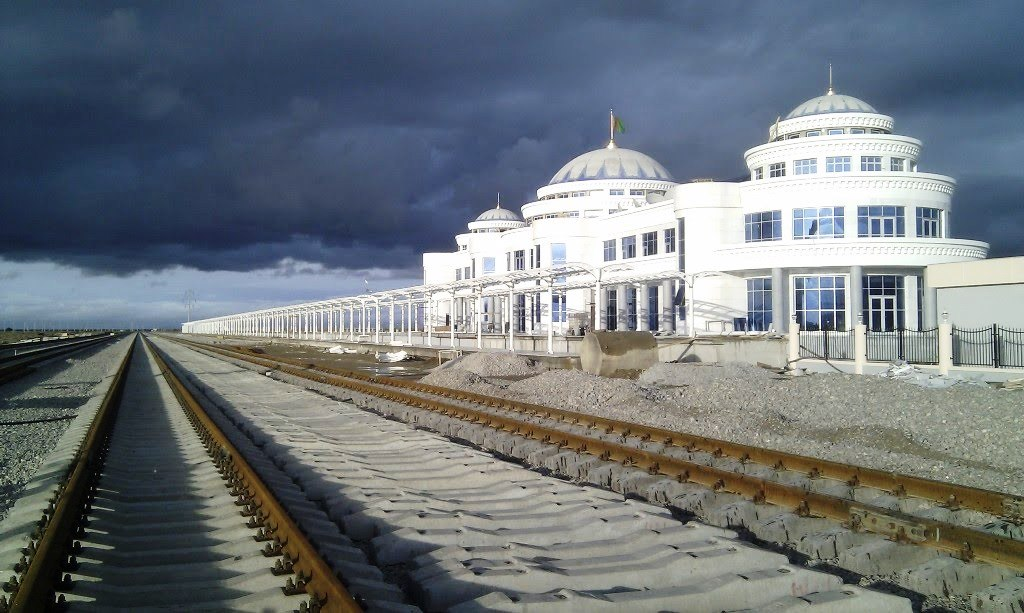
Bereket Railway Station built in 1885.

- Bereket city is originally a typical railway town. The Bereket railway station was built in 1885 followed by building Bereket city which is now an important crossroad of the Trans-Caspian Railway and North-South Transnational Railway.

== United Kingdom ==
- Ashford, Kent
- Battersea - now part of London; location of Clapham Junction
- Craven Arms
- Crewe
- Darlington
- Didcot
- Doncaster
- Eastleigh
- Newton Abbot - site of Great Western Railway
- Rugby, Warwickshire
- Sheringham
- Shildon
- Swindon
- Toton
- Willesden, together with Harlesden - now part of London
- Wolverton
- York
