= 21st Century Maritime Silk Road =

Chinese government initiative

- Simplified Chinese: 21世纪海上丝绸之路
- Traditional Chinese: 21世紀海上絲綢之路
Transcriptions
Standard Mandarin
- Hanyu Pinyin: 21 Shìjì Hǎishàng Sīchóuzhī Lù

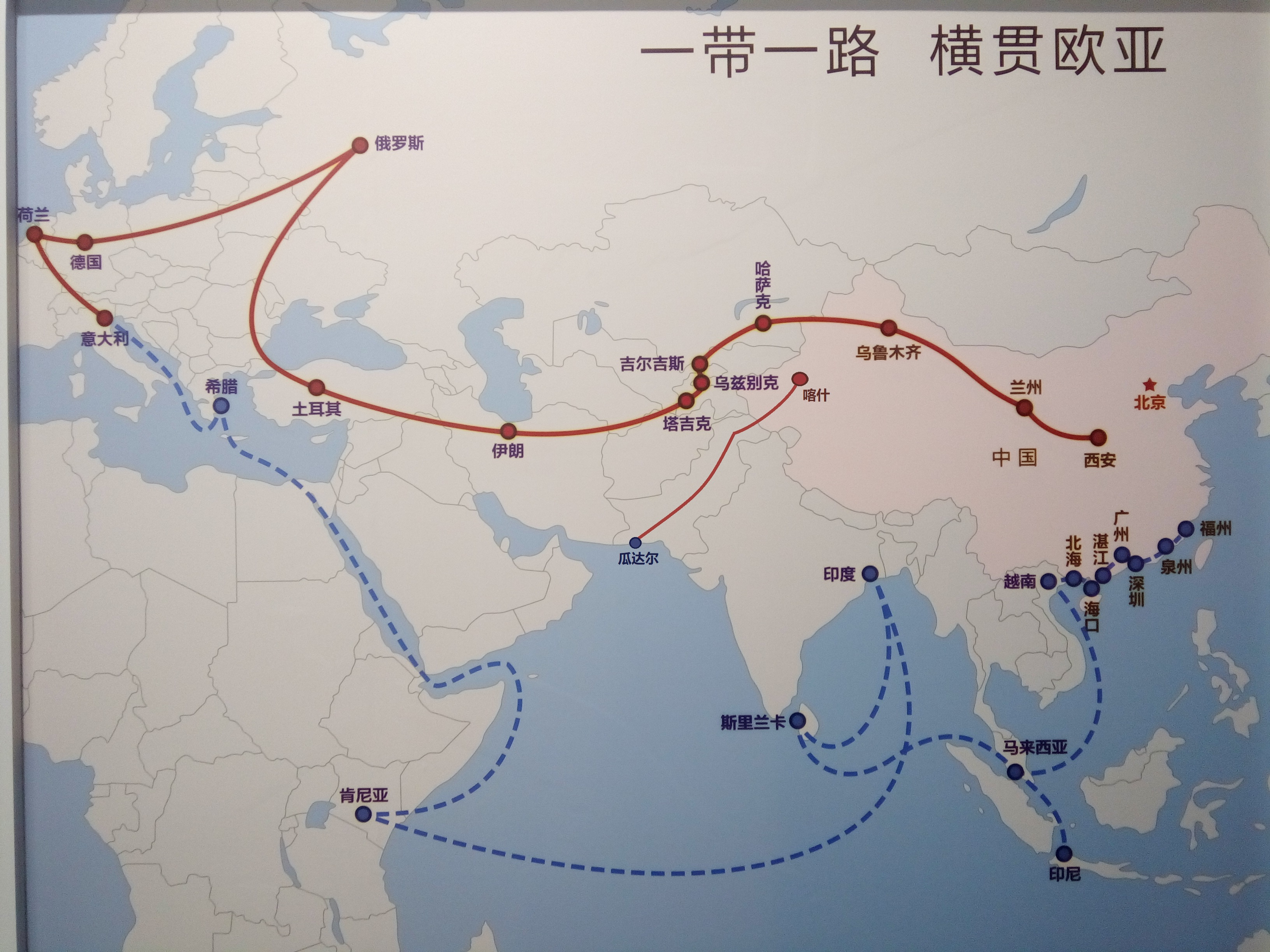
Plan of the Silk Road with its maritime branch

The 21st Century Maritime Silk Road (Chinese: 21世纪海上丝绸之路), commonly just Maritime Silk Road (MSR), is the sea route part of the Belt and Road Initiative which is a Chinese strategic initiative to increase investment and foster collaboration across the historic Silk Road.

The maritime silk road essentially runs through the Indo-Pacific and then the Indo-Mediterranean from the Chinese coast to the south via Hai Phong to Jakarta, Singapore and Kuala Lumpur through the Strait of Malacca then via Colombo in Sri Lanka towards the southern tip of India via Malé, to the East African Mombasa, from there to Djibouti, then through the Red Sea via the Suez Canal to the Mediterranean, then via Haifa, Istanbul and Athens to the Upper Adriatic region to the northern Italian hub of Trieste with its international free port and its rail connections to Central Europe and the North Sea.

The China–Pakistan Economic Corridor is an extension of the proposed Silk Road. The Maritime Silk Road coincides with the theory of China's String of Pearls strategy.

== History ==
The Maritime Silk Road initiative was first proposed by Chinese leader Xi Jinping during a speech to the Indonesian Parliament in October 2013.

In November 2014, Chinese leader Xi Jinping announced plans to create a USD $40 billion development fund, which would help finance China's plans to develop the New Silk Road and the Maritime Silk Road. China has accelerated its drive to draw Africa into the MSR with the speedy construction of a modern standard-gauge rail link between Nairobi and Mombasa.

In March 2015, the National Development and Reform Commission of China publicly released a document titled Vision and Actions on Jointly Building Silk Road Economic Belt and 21st-Century Maritime Silk Road, which discusses the principles and framework which form the foundation of the initiative.

== Routes and key ports ==
Although the routes encompassed in the MSR will be copious if the initiative comes to fruition, to date there has not been ample official information released concerning specific ports.

Between 2015 and 2022, China has leased ownership over the following ports:

- Gwadar, Pakistan: 40 years
- Kyaukpyu, Myanmar: 50 years
- Kuantan, Malaysia: 60 years
- Obock, Djibouti: 10 years
- Malacca Gateway: 99 Years
- Hambantota, Sri Lanka: 99 years
- Muara, Brunei: 60 years
- Feydhoo Finolhu, Maldives: 50 years
- Port Darwin, Australia: 99 years
- Newcastle Port, Australia: 98 years

In the 2018 Xinhua-Baltic International Shipping Centre Development Index Report, the China Economic Information Service cites the following as major routes for the 21st Century Maritime Silk Road:

=== China – Southeast Asia route ===
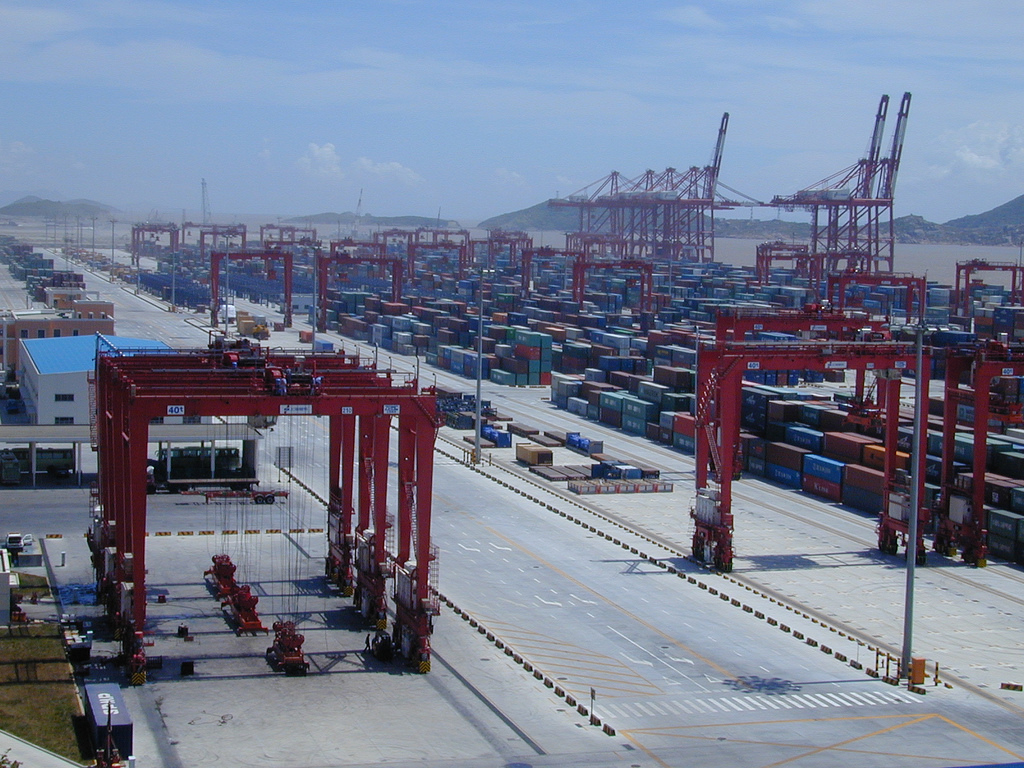
Yangshan Port of Shanghai, China

==== China – Vietnam, Myanmar ====
Qinzhou – Yangpu – Zhanjiang – Gaolan Port – Yantian – Nansha – Ho Chi Minh City (Vietnam) – Singapore – Yangon (Myanmar) – Palawan (Philippines) – Singapore – Qinzhou.

==== China – Philippines ====
Qingdao – Shanghai – Ningbo – Manila (South) – Manila (North) – Qingdao.

==== Singapore and Malaysia ====
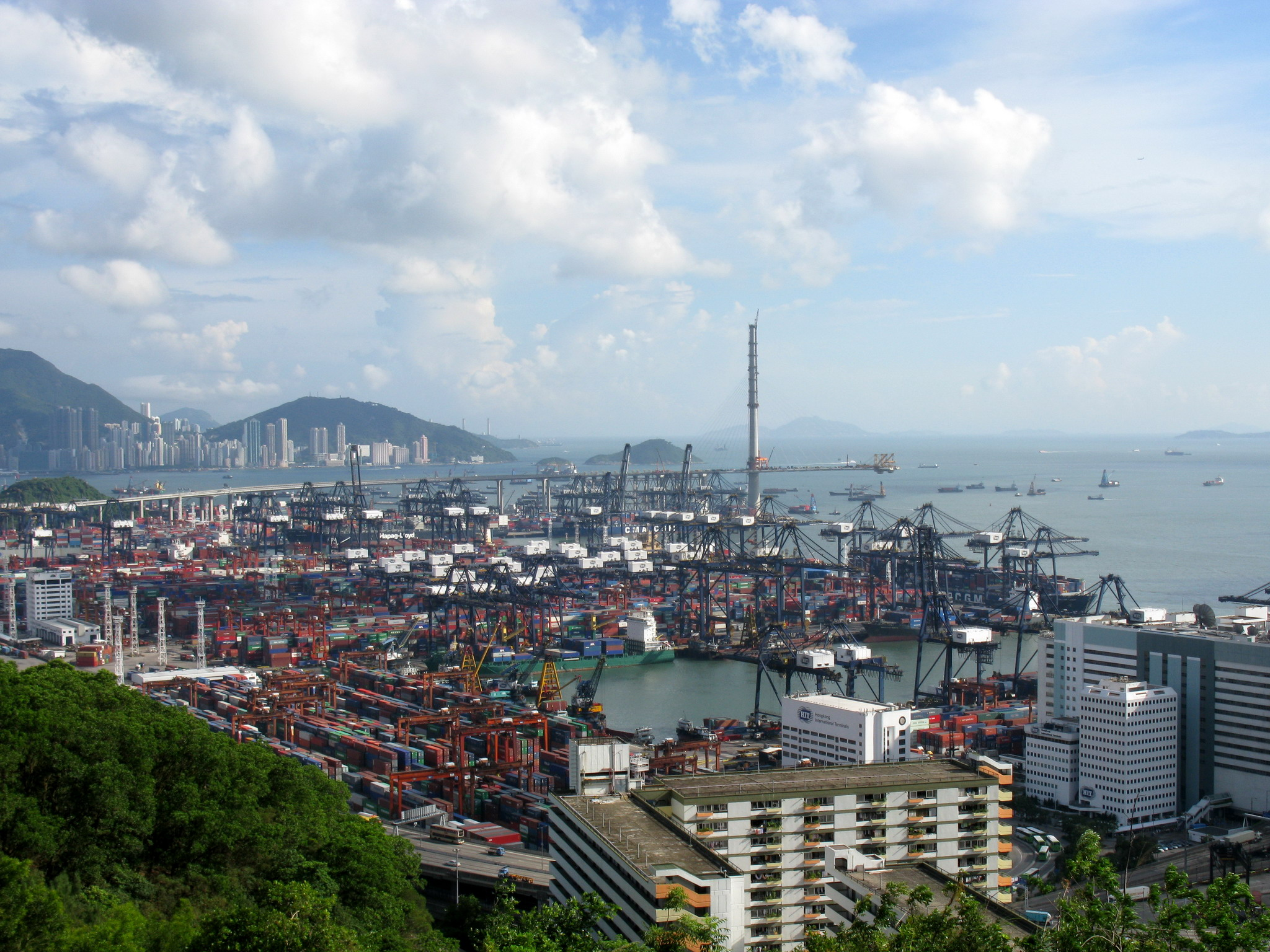
Container terminals in Kwai Chung, Hong Kong

Newport – Dalian – Qingdao – Shanghai – Xiamen – Hong Kong – Singapore – Klang Port (Malaysia) – Penang (Malaysia) – Singapore – Hong Kong – Xingang.

==== Indonesia ====
Shanghai – Newport – Dalian – Qingdao – Ningbo – Nansha – Jakarta (Indonesia) – Klang Port (Malaysia) – Singapore – Laem Chabang Port (Thailand) – Hong Kong – Shanghai.

==== China – Thailand, Cambodia ====
Ningbo – Shanghai – Shekou – Sihanoukville (Cambodia) – Bangkok – Leam Chabang (Thailand) – Ningbo.

=== China – South Asia route ===
==== China – Pakistan ====
Qingdao – Shanghai – Ningbo – Singapore – Klang Port (Malaysia) – Karachi (Pakistan) – Mundra (India) – Colombo (Sri Lanka) – Singapore – Qingdao.

==== India, Sri Lanka ====
Shanghai – Ningbo – Shekou – Singapore – Port Klang (Malaysia) – Kolkata (India) – Pipavav (India) – Colombo (Sri Lanka) – Port Klang – Singapore – Ho Chi Minh City (Vietnam) – Hong Kong – Shanghai.

=== Middle East, East Africa route ===
==== China – Iraq, UAE ====
Shanghai – Ningbo – Kaohsiung – Xiamen – Shekou – Port Klang (Malaysia) – Alishan Port (UAE) – Umm Qasr (Iraq) – Port Klang – Kaohsiung – Shanghai.

==== China – Red Sea ====
Shanghai – Ningbo – Xiamen – Chiwan – Singapore – Djibouti (East Africa) – Jeddah (Saudi Arabia) – Sudan (Sudan) – Djibouti – Port Klang – Shanghai.

=== Europe route ===
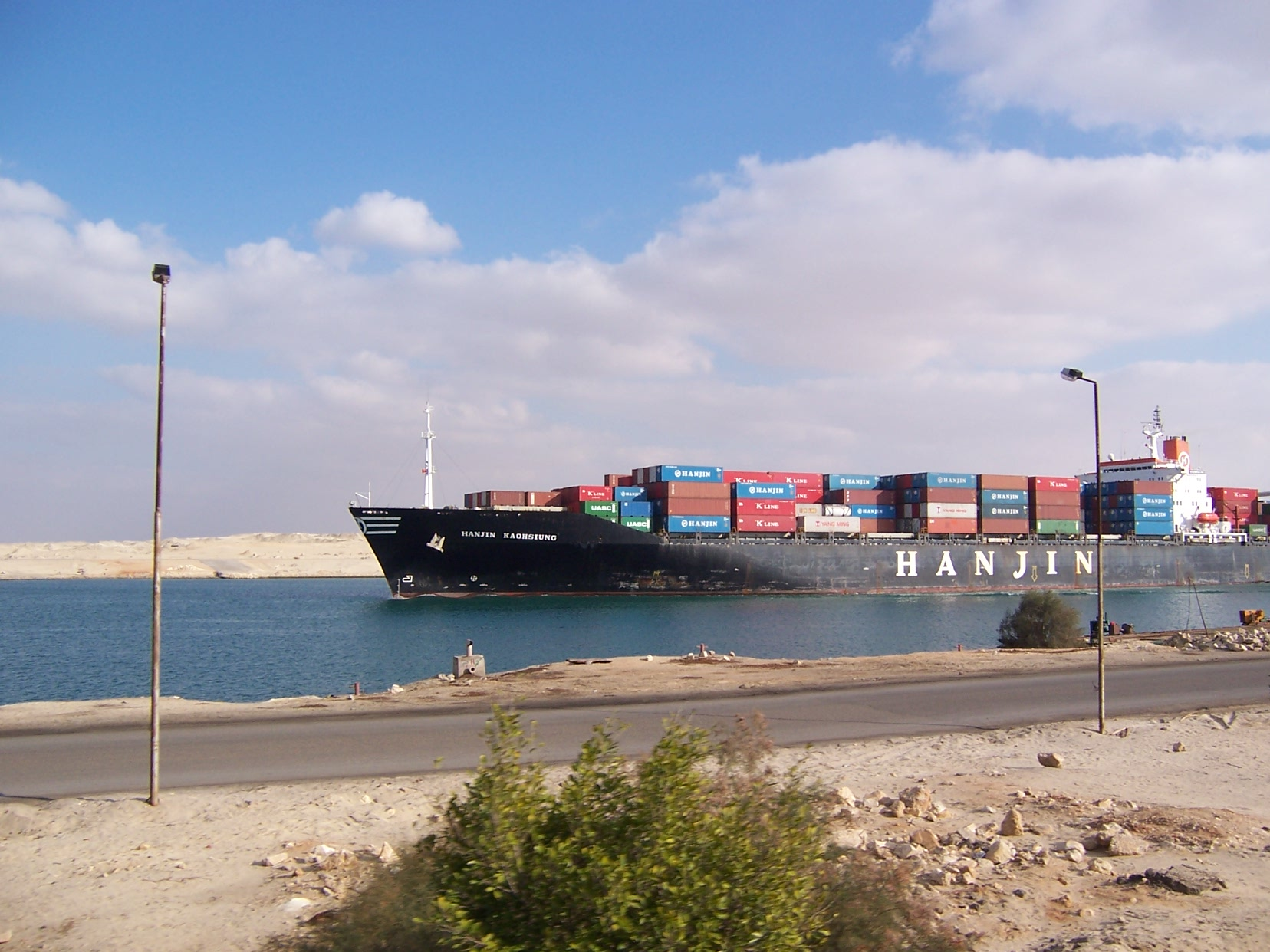
Container ship transiting the Suez Canal

The MSR route to Europe will begin in China, pass through the Malacca Strait, follow Red Sea through the Suez Canal to the Mediterranean Sea, and visit ports in Greece, Italy, France, and Spain before returning to China. The Maritime Silk Road has also an important role in the connection between East Africa and the Mediterranean region through the Suez Canal. Of particular interest to China is the port of Piraeus in Athens, Greece, which Chinese Premier Li Keqiang stated "...can become China's gateway to Europe. It is the pearl of the Mediterranean. " China is investing heavily in Athens in the port and infrastructure.

The Chinese Silk Road Initiative then led Europe to consider adapting the infrastructure to changing conditions. In recent years there have been major investments from Italy, the EU, Germany and Hungary to develop Trieste with its rail connections to Central and Eastern Europe as a central European hub of the Maritime Silk Road. This also applies to the partial relocation of the flow of goods from the northern ports to the Mediterranean.

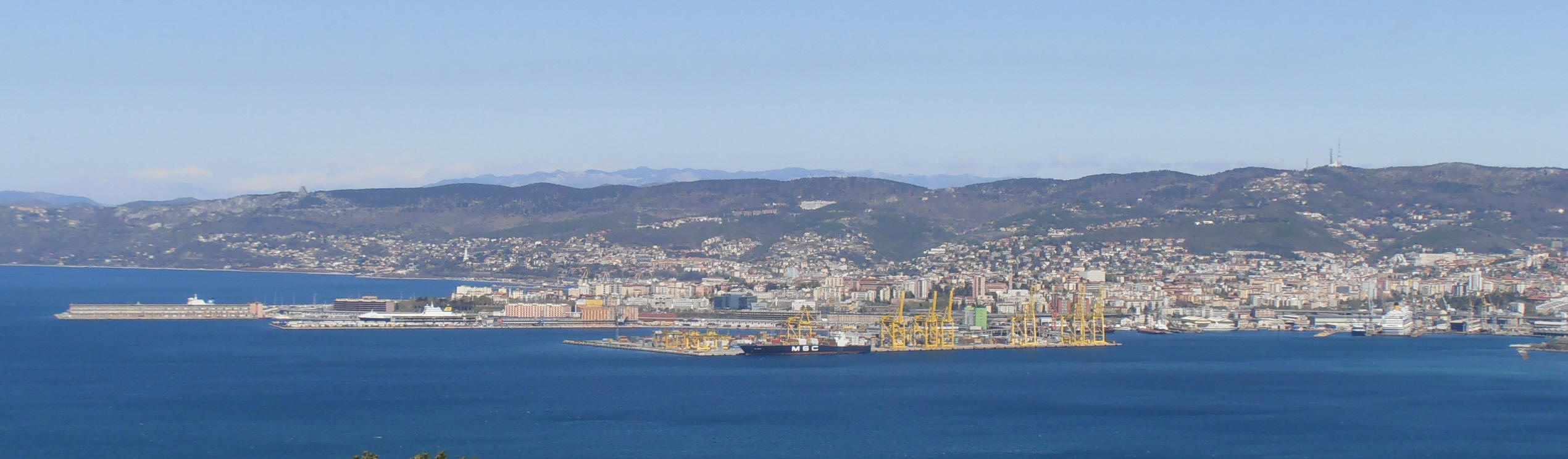
Port of Trieste

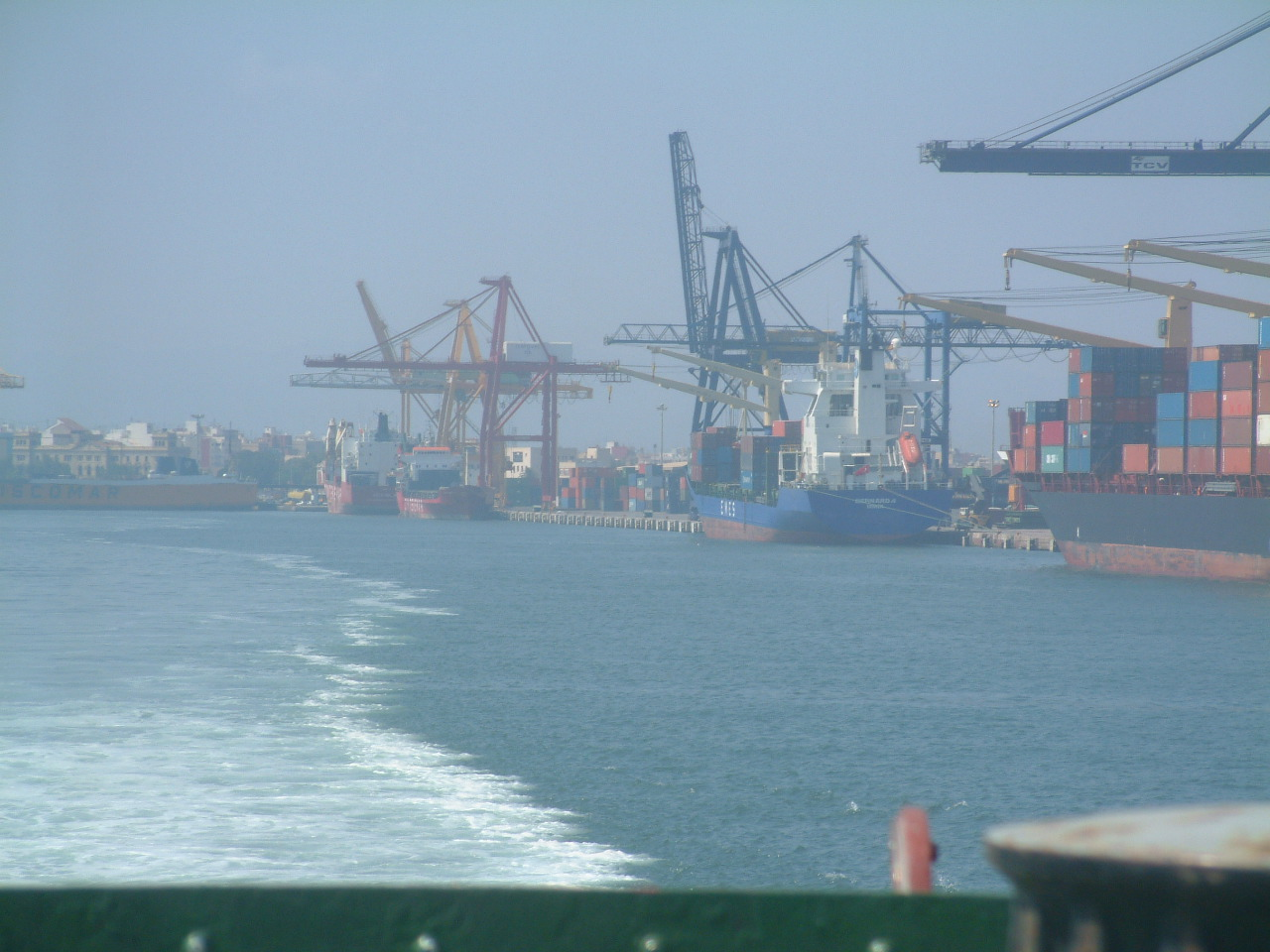
Port of Valencia

There are extensive intra-European infrastructure projects in place to adapt trade flows to current needs. This applies, for example, to the expansion of the Belgrade-Budapest railway line, the Brenner Base Tunnel and the connections on the Adriatic-Baltic and Adriatic-North Sea axes. With regard to costs and environmental protection, in contrast to longer East Asian traffic via northwest Europe, the sea route through the Suez Canal to the Adriatic bridgehead of Trieste with its free trade zone shortens the transport of goods to Central and Eastern Europe by at least four days.

Experimental attempts are also being made to organize the movement of goods from China to Europe via the Northeast Passage through the polar sea. There is already resistance from environmental protection organizations who fear significant interference in the sensitive ecosystems in the north.

One of the most important ports in the Mediterranean is Valencia, Spain. The port, in which many Chinese companies have settled, is to be provided with a free trade zone.

Qingdao – Shanghai – Ningbo – Kaohsiung – Hong Kong – Yantian – Singapore – Piraeus (Greece) – Trieste (Italy) – La Spezia (Italy) – Genoa (Italy) – Fos-sur-Mer (France) – Valencia (Spain) – Piraeus (Greece) – Jeddah (Saudi Arabia) – Colombo (Sri Lanka) – Singapore – Hong Kong

== Challenges ==
There exist a number of unresolved territorial disputes in the South China Sea between China and ASEAN countries such as Brunei, Malaysia, Indonesia, the Philippines, and Vietnam. Potential routes proposed for the MSR could contribute to increasing tensions over certain areas. However, some academics propose that the MSR initiative will provide a means for China to resolve these sovereignty-related conflicts by providing an opportunity for mutual gain.

It has been suggested that the future of the MSR will be largely dictated by the economic conditions of the participating countries. The possibility exists that China may have to make financial contributions to other MSR countries who are experiencing poor economic conditions. China will need to ensure that any loans allocated to these countries are spent appropriately.

Coordination on the national and subnational levels may be challenging for China. It has been stated that China's subnational actors – such as multinational corporations, provinces, cities, and towns – have a tendency to strongly prioritize their own interests above those of the nation and participate in government initiatives primarily to satisfy their own objectives. This could lead to inappropriate spending on projects outside the scope of China's national interests.

Gaining political approval from countries with different political systems could prove problematic for China. Countries may be wary about joining the MSR initiative due to geopolitical and security factors.

Concerns have been put forth regarding whether China will be able to receive India's cooperation and participating in bringing the initiative to fruition. India represents a strong economic force and may likely prefer to develop the Indian Ocean region's infrastructure itself rather than allow China to have any control over the region. While Chinese investment in India's underdeveloped maritime infrastructure could benefit India's economy greatly, India remains wary to accept such investment as the possibility exists that China is primarily attempting to expand its own territorial and economic interests. India has also expressed circumspection in participating in a similar initiative, the Bangladesh – China – India – Myanmar economic corridor.

== See also ==
- Asia-Africa Growth Corridor
- Container transport
- Foreign policy of China
- Golden Banana
- Indo-Pacific
- International North–South Transport Corridor
- List of ports and harbours of the Indian Ocean
- List of the largest trading partners of China
- List of world's busiest container ports
- Maritime Silk Road
- Maritime Silk Road Museum
- New Suez Canal
- Suez Canal
