= Railway town =

Settlement developed when building a railway

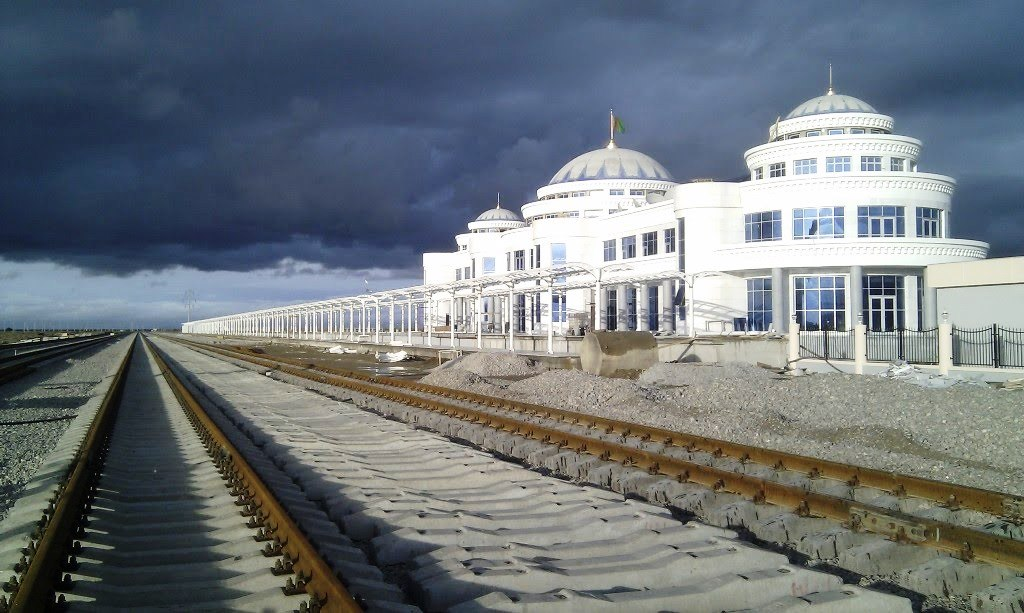
Bereket (Kazandzhik) in Turkmenistan. The town originated from a railway station built in 1885. The city is now an important crossroad of the old Trans-Caspian Railway and new North-South Transnational Railway.

A railway town, or railroad town, is a settlement that originated, or was expanded, as a result of a railway line being constructed there.

== North America ==
During the construction of the first transcontinental railroad in the 1860s, laborers lived in temporary work camps, nicknamed "Hell on Wheels," that moved along the Union Pacific Railroad as construction headed west. Most of these camps faded away but some became permanent towns on the railroad.

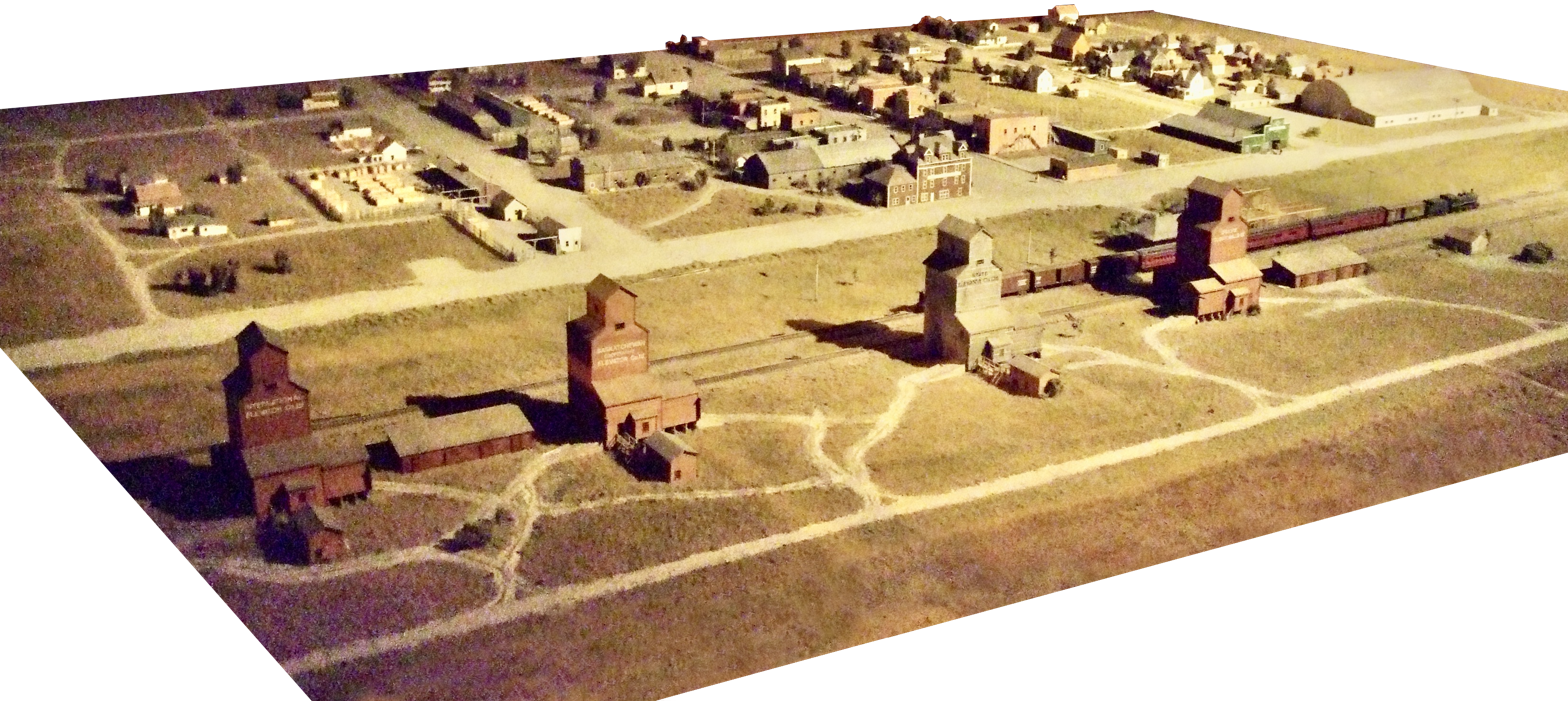
Model of a North American prairie railway town

In the 1870s, successive boomtowns sprung up in Kansas, each prospering for a year or two as a railhead, and withering when the rail line extended further west and created a new endpoint for the Chisholm Trail.

Becoming rail hubs made Chicago and Los Angeles grow from small towns to very large cities.

In western Canada, railway towns became associated with brothels and prostitution, and concerned railway companies started a series of YMCAs in the late nineteenth century in response.

=== Role in land speculation ===
In some cases, a railroad town would be started by the railroad, often using a separate town or land company, even when another town already existed nearby. The population of the existing town would shift to the railroad town. This would create a boon for the town company and its railroad founder, which would sell off lots near the station at a substantial profit, often before the railroad ever arrived at the new townsite.

Such is the case with Durango, Colorado. In the spring of 1880, William Bell of the Denver & Rio Grande Railroad scoured the La Plata County area in the vicinity of Animas City, located on the Animas River. When negotiations to acquire land through the local homesteaders fell through, Bell acquired property downstream to the south under more favorable conditions in the name of the Durango Land and Coal Company. By the end of the year, a Durango newspaper reported all of "Animas City is coming to Durango as fast as accommodations can be secured". The population, at the time estimated between 3,000 and 5,000 people, crammed into the little "box town", where the only permanent structures were saloons, dance halls, restaurants and stores.

When the railroad arrived in August 1881, the train stopped in a jubilant Durango, not Animas City. The railroad pushed on up the Animas River, reaching Silverton in July 1882, passing through Animas City without a stop. Animas City subsisted as a de facto suburb of the Durango area before annexation by Durango in 1948. The Durango and Silverton Narrow Gauge Railroad, a heritage railroad and successor to the Rio Grande in La Plata County, still passes by the townsite.

== Europe ==
In Denmark, Sweden, Finland and Norway, a related concept is the stationsby or "station town". Stationsbyer are rural towns that grew up around railways, but they were based on agricultural co-operatives and artisan communities rather than on railway industries. Among the Swedish towns mostly influenced by railways include Alvesta as a hub for the inland south and Hallsberg as a hub for the interior middle of the country. For Norway, towns such as Bryne on the west coast, Lillestrøm and Ås in the east and south of Oslo are good examples, while Skjeberg still identifies as a railway town even though no trains stop that any longer. In Finland, Kouvola and Riihimäki are the most important such towns.

=== United Kingdom ===
In Victorian Britain, the spread of railways greatly affected the fate of many small towns. Peterborough and Swindon became successful due to their status as railway towns; in contrast, towns such as Frome or Kendal remained small after being bypassed by main lines. Some entirely new towns grew up around railway works. Middlesbrough was the first new town to be developed due to the railways, growing from a hamlet of 40 into an industrial port after the Stockton and Darlington Railway was extended in 1830. Wolverton was fields before 1838 and had a population of 1,500 by 1844. Other examples of early railway towns include Ashford (Kent), Doncaster, Neasden and Rugby. Derby came to be dominated, first by the North Midland Railway, and later the Midland Railway, which based all their engineering works, as well as their company headquarters, in the town; a large area of the town was built by the company architect, Francis Thompson.

Crewe grew greatly after the Grand Junction Railway Company moved there in 1843; the two rural towns that became Crewe had a population of 500 in 1841 and the population had reached more than 40,000 by 1900. The railway town of 'New Swindon' displaced the neighbouring pre-existing town after the Great Western Railway moved there; a market town of 2,000 in 1840 became a railway town of 50,000 in 1905. Railways became major employers, with 6,000 people employed by them in Crewe in 1877 and 14,000 in Swindon in 1905.

The growth of railway towns was often in the mould of the 'paternalistic employer' providing housing, schools, hospitals, churches and civic buildings for their workers, similar to Cadbury's Bournville; there was a "very rigid and unimaginative control" of the workers by GWR in Swindon. Workforces were loyal and obedient; industrial action in railway towns was rare because the workforce depended on the company. Railwaymen dominated local politics in railway towns, particularly Francis Webb's 'Independent Railway Company Party' in Crewe and George Leeman in York. The chief mechanical engineer of GWR, Daniel Gooch, was MP for Swindon for twenty years.

Crewe was a 'company town' for its first few decades as workers moved in their thousands from other parts of the country. Most social amenities and organisations were sponsored by the railway, but moves such as the establishment of a town council in 1877 slowly reduced company influence and the railway company began to consider spending on town amenities as a municipal concern. Workers organised their own institutions such as clubs, trade unions and co-operatives to gain independence from company control; they became the basis for political opposition in railway towns.

=== Germany ===
Railway towns due to traffic junctions are Aulendorf, Bebra, Betzdorf, Buchloe, Falkenberg/Elster, Hagen, Hamm, Lehrte, Offenburg, Plattling and Treuchtlingen. Railway towns as locations of depots for pusher locomotives at the foot of gradient lines are Altenhundem or Neuenmarkt. Railway towns with large border stations are Freilassing or Weil am Rhein.

=== Austria ===
Knittelfeld is a railway town based on main workshops, with the Austrian Federal Railways as by far the largest employer. Arnoldstein was once an important border station to Italy.

=== Switzerland ===
Examples in Switzerland are Olten or as the location of a railway depot for push locomotives Erstfeld. One place with a large border station is Chiasso.

=== France ===
Examples of railway cities in France are Tergnier and Miramas. Examples of a railway town by its border station is Cerbère, where the tracks of the Spanish broad gauge end.

=== Belgium ===
In Belgium, the town of Plombières is of outstanding importance in railway transport, not in the least because of the Viaduct of Moresnet.

=== Lithuania ===
As of 2021 Lithuanian census, 8 settlements in Lithuania have the legal classification of a Railway Station, with the largest of them being Panemunėlis (Railway Station), which is larger than the nearby town of Panemunėlis.

=== Luxembourg ===
With its marshalling yard and other railway facilities on the international Brussels/Amsterdam-Luxembourg-Metz line, Bettembourg has gained great importance in transit traffic through Luxembourg.

=== Poland ===
After World War I, the city of Bentschen (today Zbąszyń) was ceded by Weimar Germany to Poland. Subsequently, the German Reichsbahn established the station Neu Bentschen, which functions as a border station and as a junction for three lines leading to the west. Since there was no larger town near the new station, the Deutsche Reichsbahn had a railway settlement built, which subsequently grew into a town. It was given the name Neu Bentschen (today Zbąszynek).

=== Portugal ===
An example of a railway town in Portugal is Entroncamento.

=== Romania ===
Simeria in Romania grew into a city through new railway facilities.

== Asia ==
=== China ===
Zhuzhou used to be a small town that sits next to the Xiang River in Hunan. The mining of Anyuan Coal Mines in Pingxiang, Jiangxi requires a rail line to transport the coals out of the coalfields and Zhuzhou became the destination. The railway transformed Zhuzhou into a prosperous industrial city in Hunan Province and one of the most important rail hubs in China.

Changchun in China was built by the Japanese, then occupying Manchuria, as a 'model town' as part of Japan's imperialist modernisation. The first railway town at Changchun was begun by the Russians in 1898, but it excluded Chinese residents. A second major railway town was designed and built from 1905 by the South Manchuria Railway, inspired by Russian railway towns such as Dalian. It was based on a rectangular system that contrasted with the circular walled town of old Changchun, and grid patterns became the standard for Chinese railway towns. The SMR developed dozens of railway towns in north-east China from 1906 to 1936, such as at Harbin and Mukden.

=== South Korea ===
Daejeon City in South Korea was a small village before the 1900s, the construction of Gyeongbu Line and Honam Line, and the subsequent transfer of the provincial capital from historic city of Gongju made Daejeon grew into a major transportation hub in Korea. Korail's headquarters is located in Daejeon.

== Oceania ==
=== Australia ===
When the 1694 kilometres (1053 miles) Trans-Australian Railway was built in the mid-1910s, much of it across the uninhabited Nullarbor Plain, the federal government erected almost 50 villages to accommodate railway employees and their families – but few if any facilities, other than a schoolroom in the larger settlements. A special train, with an onboard butcher, ran weekly to provide supplies. When a change was made in the early 1950s from steam to diesel locomotives, with their longer fuel range and far lower repairs and maintenance, the need for such settlements decreased greatly. Subsequently, computerisation of operations, radio communication, and upgrading to concrete sleepers and continuously welded rail reduced track inspection and maintenance considerably. Since 2001, maintenance work has been undertaken by contractors whose families do not live on the line. Consequently, almost all buildings on the railway have been demolished.

Elsewhere in Australia, many settlements also originated as support places along railway lines. Often in those cases, the town plan provided for the railway to be located at, or near, the centre. Far from being viewed as a dirty, noisy, dangerous, disruptive intruder, the railway's placement reflected the social outlook and economic conditions of its time and the central importance of its service to the community.

As a result of subsequent economic and social change, not least the availability of motor vehicles since the 1920s, good highways since the 1960s and a steep decline in farm employment since 2000, (Note: After many years of slight decline, farm employment dropped by one-third in the 20 years after 2000.) few but the largest railway-induced settlements have endured into the 21st century.

=== New Zealand ===
The Hamilton suburb of Frankton is located at the junction of the North Island Main Trunk and the East Coast Main Trunk. Frankton was originally an independent borough but it merged with Hamilton Borough in 1917. In the 20th century, Frankton was a busy railway town, with both industrial and passenger uses. Frankton includes a historic area of 1920s pre-fabricated cottages originally built for railway workers.

== See also ==
- Company town
- Crossroads village
- List of railway towns
- Streetcar suburb
- Transit-oriented development
