= Oboý railway station =

Railway station in Bereket District, Turkmenistan

General information
- Location: Bereket District, Balkan Province; Turkmenistan
- Owner: Türkmendemirýollary
- Platforms: 1

Construction
- Parking: 10-15
- Cycle facilities: yes

History
- Opened: 2014
Location

Oboý railway station (Turkmen: Oboý demirýol menzili) is the small railway station near Oboý settlement in Bereket District, Balkan Province, Turkmenistan. It was built in 2014.

The station is operated by a state owned company Türkmendemirýollary.

Oboý Station is one of the railway stations located on the North-South Transnational Railway (Russia - Kazakhstan - Turkmenistan - Iran - Persian Gulf).

== See also ==
- Railway stations in Turkmenistan
- Transport in Turkmenistan
- North-South Transnational Railway
