= Aýdyň =

Aýdyň Aýdyň obasy
- Village
- Location in Turkmenistan
- Coordinates: 39°22′55″N 54°49′45″E
- Country: Turkmenistan
- Province: Balkan Province
- District: Bereket District
- Rural council: Oboý geňeşligi

Population (2022 official census)
  - Total: 1,513
- Time zone: UTC+5

Aýdyň is a village built around a train station in Balkan Province, Turkmenistan. The official census states it had a population of 1,513 in 2022, although this is highly doubtful and unlikely as the settlement features only six Soviet-era buildings.

== Etymology ==
Aýdyň is a Turkmen word that may roughly be translated as "bright."

== Overview ==
The village stands along the Aşgabat-Türkmenbaşy railway between the stations Arkaç (previously known as Pereval, "Перевал" in Russian) on the east, and Baleýşem ("Балла-Ишем") on the west. It is roughly halfway between Bereket and Balkanabat.

It was part of Däneata rural council until its dissolution on May 19, 2016. It is now part of Oboý rural council.

== Rural Council ==
Aýdyň is one of six villages included in Oboý rural council (Oboý geňeşligi):

- Oboý, village
- Akjaguýma, village
- Arkaç, village
- Aýdyň, village
- Çitli, village
- Däneata, village

== See also ==
- Bereket District
- List of municipalities in Balkan Province
- Oboý
