= Oboý =

Oboý Oboý obasy
- Village
- Location in Turkmenistan
- Coordinates: 39°09′01″N 55°18′55″E
- Country: Turkmenistan
- Province: Balkan Province
- District: Bereket District
- Rural Council: Oboý geňeşligi
- Established: 1840
- Elevation: 105 m (344 ft)

Population (2022 official census)
  - Total: 1,890
- Time zone: UTC+5 (+5 GMT)
- Area code: +(993)

Oboý is a village in Bereket District, Balkan Province, Turkmenistan. As of 2022, it had a population of 1,890 people.

== Overview ==
The settlement is located 35 km (22 mi) south-west of Bereket, the capital of Bereket District. Oboy is located near Kyurendag Ridge which is the most western foothills of the Kopetdag Mountains. The highest point of Kyurendag ridge is 968 m (3,176 ft).

The climate in the village is largely affected by the Karakum Desert.

== Oboý Railway Station ==
Bereket Railway Station (Oboý demirýol menzili) is the small railway station located 2 km from Oboy settlement. It was built in 2014. Operated by the Türkmendemirýollary, Oboý Station is located on the North-South Transnational Railway (Russia - Kazakhstan - Turkmenistan - Iran - Persian Gulf.

== Rural Council ==
The village is the seat of a rural council (geňeşlik) including six villages:

- Oboý, village
- Akjaguýma, village
- Arkaç, village
- Aýdyň, village
- Çitli, village
- Däneata, village

== See also ==
- Bereket District
- Balkan Province
- List of municipalities in Balkan Province
- List of cities, towns and villages in Turkmenistan
