= Astara–Rasht–Qazvin railway =

Railway connecting Azerbaijan and Iran

The Astara–Rasht–Qazvin railway is a transport corridor that connects existing railways of Russia, Azerbaijan and Iran. The project is carried out within the framework of the International North–South Transport Corridor. The purpose of the project is to integrate the transport and information routes of Russia, Azerbaijan, Iran and India.

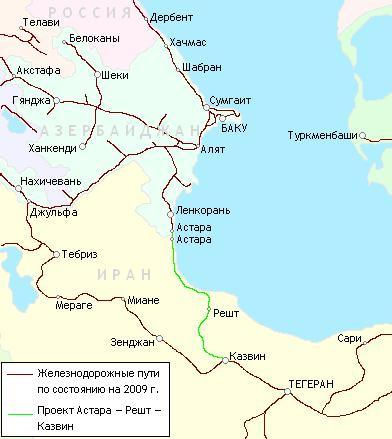
Map of the Astara–Rasht–Qazvin railway

== History ==
The agreement on the route's construction was signed by three parties (Iran, Azerbaijan and Russia) in 2005. The most challenging section from an engineering point of view was the construction of the railway between Rasht and Qazvin which started in 2009 and took nearly a decade to complete. On 22 November 2018, a test train ran for the first time on that 164-km section of the line whose formal opening ceremony was held on 6 March 2019 with the Iranian President Hassan Rouhani, Azerbaijani Minister of Economy Shahin Mustafayev plus officials from Pakistan and Iraq in attendance. The line was a major engineering achievement including some 53 tunnels with a cumulative length of over 22 km.

The bridge and short section of track between Azerbaijani and Iranian Astara, using dual gauges (1520 mm and 1435 mm) including a 82.5-m river bridge over the Astarachay River, was completed in March 2017. The first arrival of a train coming all the way from Russia to Iranian Astara was documented on February 8, 2018. Immediately after putting into operation the section Astara (Azerbaijan) – Astara (Iran) in 2018, the Iranian section of the railway together with the Astara station and the newly built cargo terminal was leased to Azerbaijan for a period of 25 years. During the first 11 months of operation, around 270,000 tons of cargo was transported via this railway, growing to 364,000 tons in 2019.

As of early 2019, the construction of the 130-km Rasht–Astara leg remained at a 'study and review stage' but with approval granted in Iran as of January and around half of the estimated cost ($1.1 billion) secured by a preferential loan of $500 million from Azerbaijan. Some press reports claimed that track laying should be complete by around 2023 whilst others hinted that as of the ECO meeting of 17 December 2019, no physical construction had yet commenced. In November 2020, the Iranian ambassador to Russia was quoted as calling for a rapid completion of the Rasht–Astara line as an economic imperative.

As of April 2022, only the first section between Rasht and Anzali Caspian Port was reported as expected to open in 2023, later revised to spring 2024, with inauguration confirmed 20 June 2024, the remainder of the route from just south-east of Bandar Anzali to Astara taking a further 5 years at a cost of €1.6 billion now primarily financed by a loan from Russia.

In May 2025, it was announced that the Anzali–Astara leg will be 162-km–long and will feature 8 stations, 56 bridges and 35 overpasses. As of 2026, construction on the missing link had commenced in a southerly direction from Astara as far as Lavandevil.

== See also ==
- Baku–Tbilisi–Kars railway
- Pipelines in Azerbaijan
