= Bereket Railway Depot =

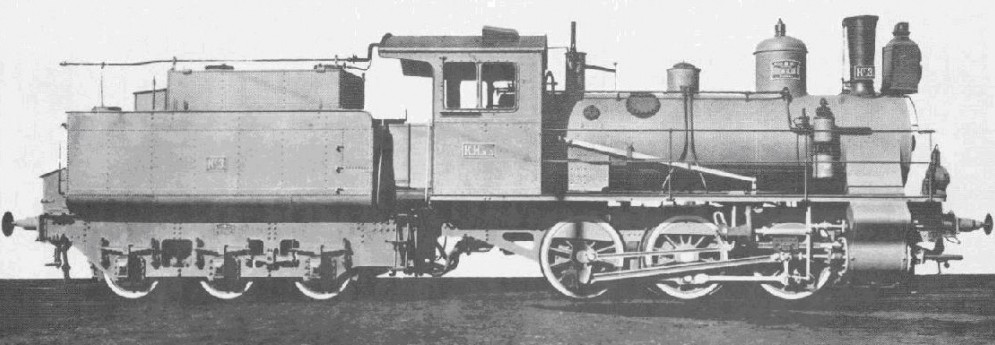
Bereket Railway Depot owns a Russian made class T locomotive ТЭ-189 (built between 1857 and 1915).

Bereket Railway Depot (or Bereket RD) (Turkmen: Bereket demirýol deposy) is a railway depot in Bereket city where locomotives are serviced and maintained.

It is one of the oldest and biggest MPDs in Turkmenistan. The Depot was built in 1889.

In its storage area, the Bereket Depot has a relic Russian made class T locomotives ТЭ-189 (built between 1857 and 1915), FD class steam locomotives ФД20-2526, ФД20-2494 (ФД20-1441) (built between 1931 and 1942), and Russian class E locomotives Эр796-88, Эм734-66 (Эм733-96), Эу705-41, Эм725-30, Э-13 (built between 1912 and 1957).

There are also several ТЭ1 class locomotives, whose prototype was the famous US made ALCO RSD-1 locomotive.

The new locomotive depot of Bereket Railway Station, a branch of the Demirýollary OJSC, was built in 2017 and is equipped with modern equipment for maintenance, light and major repairs of locomotives, including electrical equipment and forge shops.

== See also ==
- Bereket District
- Bereket Railway Station
