= Bereket railway station (Turkmenistan) =

Railway station in Bereket, Balkan Province, Turkmenistan

Bereket railway station Bereket demirýol menzili
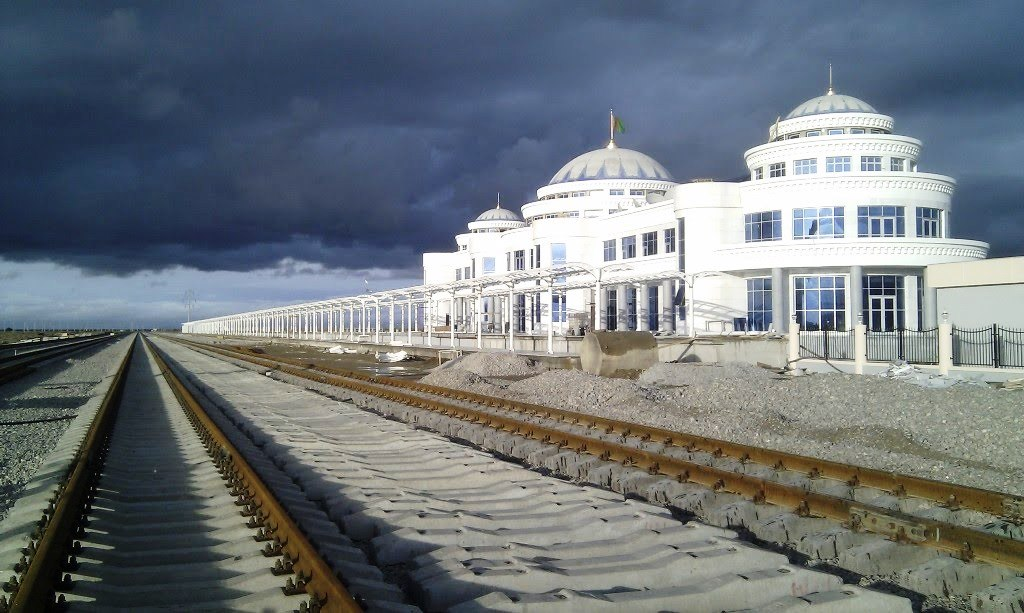
- New railway station in Bereket city (Bereket II), October 2013.

General information
- Location: Bereket, Balkan Province; Turkmenistan
- Coordinates: 39.2455°N 55.5216°E
- Elevation: 205 m (673 ft)
- Owner: Türkmendemirýollary

Construction
- Parking: 100 cars
- Cycle facilities: yes

History
- Opened: 1885
- Rebuilt: 2013
- Former names: Kazandjik railway station
Location

Bereket railway station (Turkmen: Bereket demirýol menzili) is the main railway station in the city of Bereket, Turkmenistan. It was built in 1885. The station is operated by the Türkmendemirýollary.

Bereket station is an important strategic railway crossroad on the Trans-Caspian Railway (Caspian Sea - Turkmenistan - Uzbekistan - Kazakhstan) and North-South Transnational Railway (Russia - Kazakhstan - Turkmenistan - Iran - Persian Gulf.

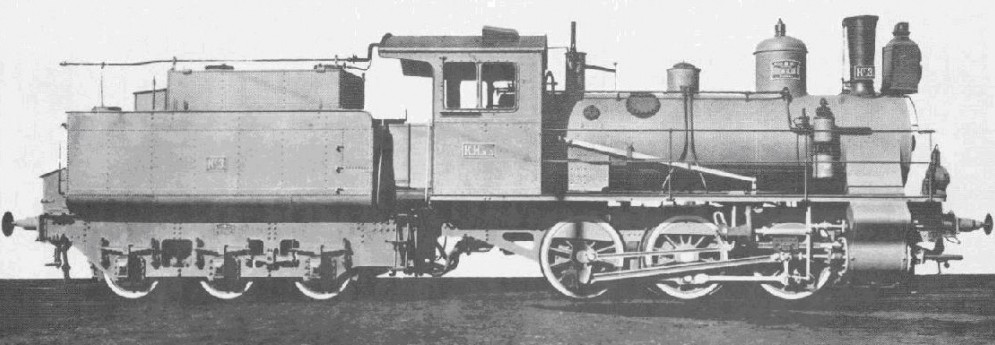
Bereket Railway Depot owns a Russian made class T locomotive ТЭ-189 (built between 1857—1915).

Bereket Railway Depot (or Bereket RD) (Turkmen: Bereket demirýol deposy) is a railway depot in Bereket city where locomotives are serviced and maintained. It is one of the oldest and biggest MPDs in Turkmenistan. The Depot was built in 1889.

== History ==
The station was built in 1885. The station building was reconstructed in 2013.

== See also ==
- Railway stations in Turkmenistan
- Transport in Turkmenistan
- Trans-Caspian Railway
- Trans-Karakum Railway
- North-South Transnational Railway
