= Asia-Africa Growth Corridor =

International economic cooperation agreement

- Established: 25 May 2017
- Members: Bangladesh; India; Iran; Japan; Kenya; Madagascar; Maldives; Mauritius; Mongolia; Myanmar; Seychelles; Singapore; Sri Lanka; Tanzania; Thailand; Zambia; Zimbabwe

The Asia-Africa Growth Corridor or AAGC is an economic cooperation agreement between the governments of India, Japan and multiple African countries (17 States).

India on 25 May 2017 launched a vision document for Asia-Africa Growth Corridor or AAGC at the African Development Bank meeting in Gujarat. The Research and Information System for Developing Countries (RIS), New Delhi, the Economic Research Institute for ASEAN and East Asia (ERIA), Jakarta, and Institute of Developing Economies (IDE-JETRO), Tokyo, have developed the Vision Document based on consultations with Asian and African think-tanks. It aims for Indo-Japanese collaboration to develop quality infrastructure in Africa, complemented by digital connectivity, which would undertake the realization of the idea of creating free and open Indo-Pacific Region. The AAGC will give priority to development projects in health and pharmaceuticals, agriculture and agro-processing, disaster management and skill enhancement. The connectivity aspects of the AAGC will be supplemented with quality infrastructure.

Unlike OBOR, now BRI (Belt and Road Initiative), which entails development of both land corridor (new economic belt) and ocean (marine silk road), AAGC will essentially be a sea corridor linking Africa with India and other countries of South-East Asia and Oceania by reviving ancient sea-routes and creating new sea corridors that will link ports in Jamnagar (Gujarat) with Djibouti in the Gulf of Aden and similarly the ports of Mombasa and Zanzibar will be connected to ports near Madurai; Kolkata will be linked to Sittwe port in Myanmar.

The AAGC would consist of four main components: development and cooperation projects, quality infrastructure and institutional connectivity, capacity and skill enhancement and people-to-people partnerships. These four components as well as four elements or four pillars are complementary to promote growth and all round development in both the continents...

— the Vision Document

According to the Vision Document many fields of collaboration were laid out. Digital connectivity will also support the growth of innovative technology and services between Asia and Africa. There is scope for Asia to share its experiences of growth and development with Africa. There are five main aspects. These are: (a) effective mobilization of financial resources; (b) their alignment with socio-economic development and development strategies of partner countries and regions; (c) application of high-quality standards in terms of compliance with international standards established to mitigate environmental and social impact; (d) provision of quality of infrastructure taking into account aspects of economic efficiency and durability, inclusiveness, safety and disaster-resilience, sustainability as well as convenience and amenities; and (e) contribution to the local society and economy.

== See also ==
- International North–South Transport Corridor
