= International North–South Transport Corridor =

International freight corridor, Moscow to Mumbai

International North–South Transport Corridor (INSTC)
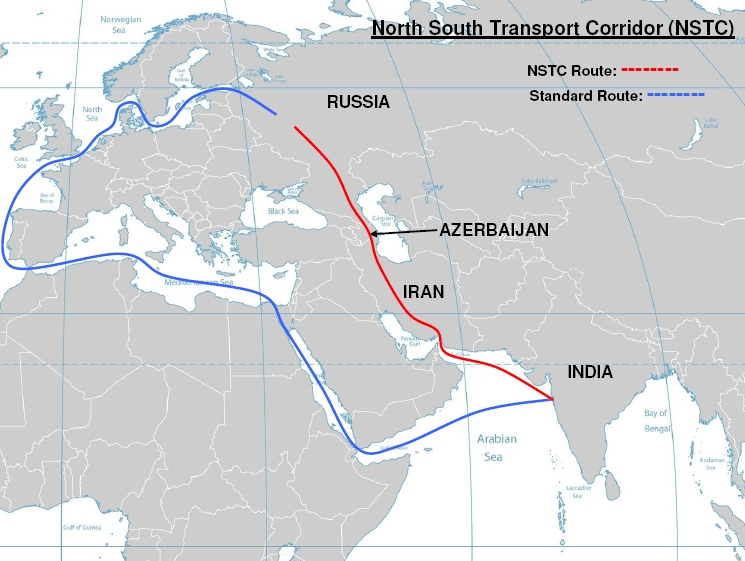
- North South Transport Corridor route via India, Iran, Azerbaijan and Russia

Route information
- Length: 4,500 mi (7,200 km)

Major junctions
- North end: Moscow, Russian Federation
- South end: Mumbai, India

Location
- Countries: Azerbaijan; India; Iran; Russian Federation

Highway system
- Asian Highway Network

The International North–South Transport Corridor (INSTC) is a 7,200-km (4,500 mile) long multi-mode network of ship, rail, and road routes for moving freight between Azerbaijan, Central Asia, Europe, India, Iran, and Russia. The route primarily involves moving freight from India, Iran, Azerbaijan, and the Russian Federation via ship, rail, and road. The objective of the corridor is to increase trade connectivity between major cities such as Mumbai, Moscow, Tehran, Baku, Bandar Abbas, Astrakhan, Bandar Anzali, etc. Dry runs of two routes were conducted in 2014. The first was Mumbai to Baku via Bandar Abbas, and the second was Mumbai to Astrakhan via Bandar Abbas, Tehran, and Bandar Anzali. The objective of the study was to identify and address key bottlenecks. The results showed that transport costs were reduced by "$2,500 per 15 tons of cargo". Other routes under consideration include via Kazakhstan and Turkmenistan.

This will also synchronize with the Ashgabat Agreement, a Multimodal transport agreement signed by India (2018), Oman (2011), Iran (2011), Turkmenistan (2011), Uzbekistan (2011), and Kazakhstan (2015) for creating an international transport and transit corridor facilitating transportation of goods between Central Asia and the Persian Gulf. The Ashgabat Agreement went into effect in April 2016, and the transportation network was eventually operationalized.

As of 2026, further development of the initiative had been stalled by sanctions against key partners Iran and Russia.

== History ==
Russian, Iranian, and Indian representatives signed the agreement for the NSTC project on 16 May 2002. All three countries are founding member states on the project. Other important member states include Azerbaijan, Armenia, Kazakhstan, and Belarus, with other states having varying levels of involvement. Azerbaijan is heavily involved in the project and is currently building new train lines and roads to complete missing links in the NSTC. Turkmenistan currently is not a formal member but is likely to have road connectivity to the corridor. Prime Minister Narendra Modi during a state visit to Turkmenistan formally invited it to become a member state on the project, saying, "I also proposed that Turkmenistan becomes a member of the International North South Transport Corridor."

As of 2026, INSTC development had been limited by the sanctions against key partners Iran and Russia.

=== 2014: bottleneck study ===
Dry runs of two routes were conducted in 2014. The first was Mumbai to Baku via Bandar Abbas, and the second was Mumbai to Astrakhan via Bandar Abbas, Tehran, and Bandar Anzali. The objective of the study was to identify and address key bottlenecks. The results showed that transport costs were reduced by "$2,500 per 15 tons of cargo". Other routes under consideration include via Kazakhstan and Turkmenistan.

== INSTC project overview ==
=== Objectives ===
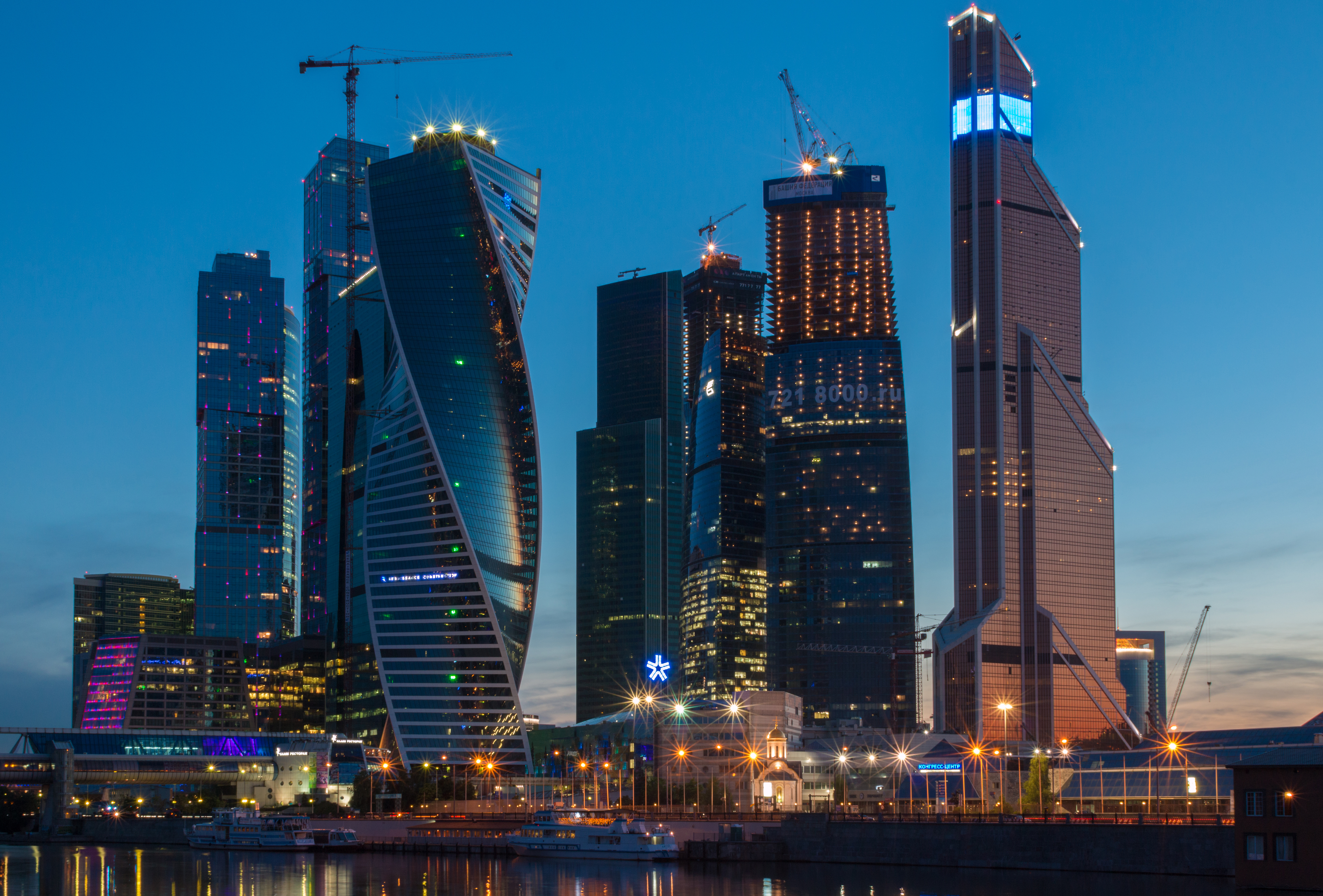
Moscow, Russia is the northern terminus of the NSTC

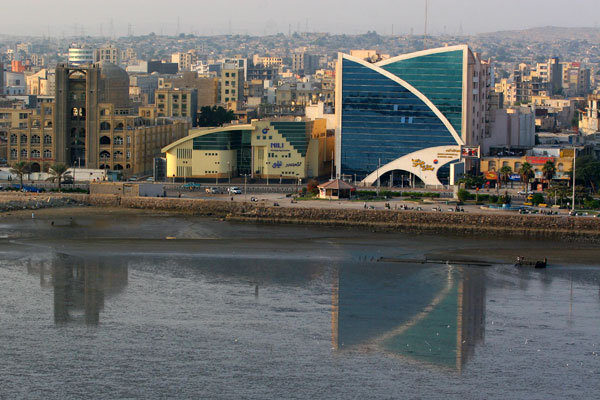
Bandar Abbas, Iran is a key port connection on the NSTC

The primary objective of the NSTC project is to reduce costs in terms of time and money over the traditional route currently being used. Analysts predict that improving transport connectivity between Russia, Central Asia, Iran, and India will increase their respective bilateral trade volumes. A study conducted by the Federation of Freight Forwarders Associations in India (FFFAI) www.fffai.org found that the route is "30% cheaper and 40% shorter than the current traditional route". Analysts predict that the corridor is likely to increase trade connectivity between major cities such as Mumbai, Moscow, Tehran, Baku, Bandar Abbas, Astrakhan, Bandar Anzal, etc.

=== Benefts of INSTC ===
The positioning of the INSTC as an alternative to the conventional deep sea Suez Canal route is another major advantage of this route, taking into account geostrategic and economic diplomacy for all the involved countries, particularly Iran and Russia, both of which are subject to U.S. sanctions, in addition to the fact that it is more cost-effective and saves a significant amount of travel time.

A survey by the Federation of Freight Forwarders Associations in India (FFFAI) www.fffai.org found that INSTC is "30 percent cheaper and 40 percent shorter than the traditional route via the Suez Canal."

=== Member states ===
- Members — India, Iran, Russia, Azerbaijan, Kazakhstan, Armenia, Belarus , Oman , Kyrgyzstan , Tajikistan , Syria , Turkey , Ukraine
- Observers — Bulgaria.

== Project initiatives ==
=== Azerbaijan: road and rail routes integration (completed) ===
The NSTC route through Azerbaijan allows India–Iran–Azerbaijan–Russia–Kazakhstan transport connectivity. Iran started construction work to complete the missing link of the Astara–Rasht–Qazvin railway (205 km; 127 miles) and road including part of the Astara–Rasht section (164 km; 102 miles). It involves construction of 369 km (230 miles) of bridges and railway line to link the southern sections to the northern ones. Once completed, 22 new tunnels and 15 bridges will have been added to the route.

On 7 January 2017, it was announced that the remaining construction of the Qazvin to Rasht rail route was 90% complete and was to be completed within 2017, whilst construction on the first section of the remaining Rasht-Astara section of road would also start in 2017.

=== Armenia–Iran Railway connectivity (planned) ===
The Armenia–Iran Railway Concession is also called the Southern Armenia Railway or the North-South Railway Corridor. As of April 2017, the project remained only on paper and had no financier because the economic feasibility is doubtful, although Armenia continues to try to find sponsors and private investors to make the project economically more viable.

On 28 July 2012, a concession agreement was awarded to Dubai-based Rasia FZE (a Rasia Group investment company) for the feasibility, design, financing, construction, and operation of a new railway link between Armenia and Iran having an operating period of 30 years, with a right of extension for another 20 years. The Armenia-Iran railway is called the Southern Armenia Railway project and forms the key missing link in the International North-South Transport Corridor between the Black Sea and the Persian Gulf. Prior to the feasibility study being completed, the Southern Armenia Railway was anticipated to be a 316 km (196 mile) railway linking Gavar, 50 km (30 miles) east of Yerevan near Lake Sevan, with the Iranian border near Meghri.

On 24 January 2013, during an announcement and press conference, the previously signed concession agreement was announced, and a separate tripartite memorandum of understanding was signed in Yerevan by Rasia FZE, Russian Railways (RZD) subsidiary South Caucasus Railway, and the government of Armenia concerning technical cooperation, investment, and the future operation of the Southern Armenia Railway. Rasia FZE announced its appointment of China Communications Construction Company as the "lead member of the development consortium" for the project and the commencement of the feasibility study.

Following a meeting on 3 September 2013 with Serzh Sargsyan, the President of Armenia, President Vladimir Putin of the Russian Federation stated that Russian Railways could invest about RUB 15 billion in the development of the Armenian Railway.

In mid-September 2013, Rasia FZE announced in a meeting with Armenian Prime Minister Tigran Sargsyan the achievement of a key milestone for the Southern Armenia Railway, including the release of a highly favorable feasibility study and the recommended railway design route from China Communications Construction Company. Having reached this key milestone, Rasia FZE moved to secure essential regional cooperation for the financing, construction, and operation stages of the project. The feasibility study results indicated that the Southern Armenia Railway would cost approximately US $3.5 billion to construct, have a length of 305 kilometers (190 miles) from Gagarin to Agarak, and provide a base operating capacity of 25 million tons per annum. The railway would have 84 bridges spanning 19.6 kilometers (12.2 miles) and 60 tunnels of 102.3 kilometers (63.5 miles), comprising 40% of the total project length.

As the key missing link in the International North–South Transport Corridor, the Southern Armenia Railway would create the shortest transportation route from the ports of the Black Sea to the ports of the Persian Gulf. The Southern Armenia Railway would establish a major commodities transit corridor between Europe and the Persian Gulf region, based on traffic volume forecasts of 18.3 million tons per annum. At completion of railway construction and commencement of operations, transport costs and times for the region are expected to improve substantially, fostering greater regional trade and economic growth with extraordinary direct benefits for the Armenian economy, including alleviation of the economic pressures caused by the blockade against Armenia by Turkey and Azerbaijan due to Armenia's and Azerbaijan's war over Karabakh.

=== Iran's integration with INSTC ===
==== Iran's Astara port integration (completed) ====
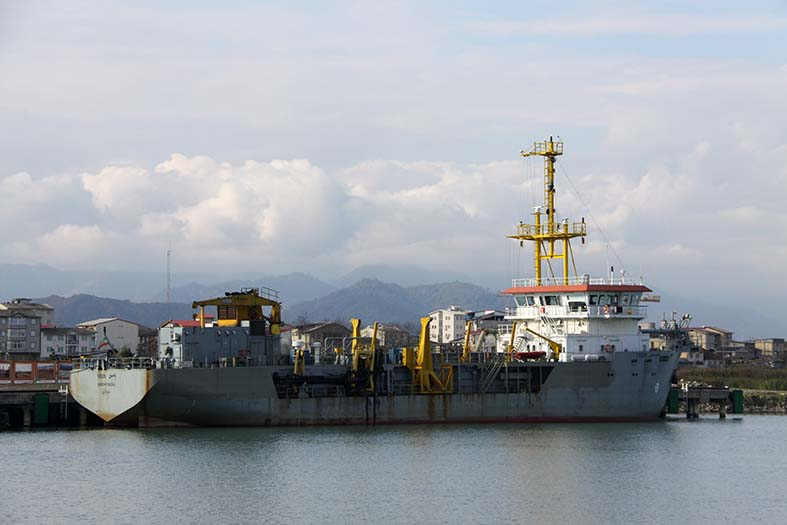
The port of Astara has been integrated with the NSTC.

In March 2013 Iran inaugurated the port of Astara, located south-west of the Caspian Sea. The port has been integrated with the NSTC to improve its maritime connectivity across the Caspian Sea. Iran has invested 22 million dollars in the port and plans to increase investment by 10% to expand the port. The Current capacity is 600,000 tons, but there are plans to increase capacity to 3 million tons. Commonwealth of Independent States (CIS) are the main producers of grains which will be exported to Africa through Iran's Bandar Abbas port. The port will allow Russian goods to reach inland provinces of Iran more quickly and cheaply. Products from Russia, Azerbaijan, Kazakhstan, and Turkmenistan can be sent to India through Iran's Bandar Abbas port, which is the fastest way to reach India.

==== Iranrud Trans-Iranian canal (proposed) ====
Iranrud (Iran's river) is a plan to build a canal from the Caspian Sea to the Indian Ocean, with two routes, a river through Dasht-e Lut and another canal to Lake Urmia, and after that to the Persian Gulf. The idea of linking the Persian Gulf and the Caspian Sea by a canal was developed already in the late 19th century.

=== India-Iran's integration with INSTC via India's Chabahar Port (completed) ===
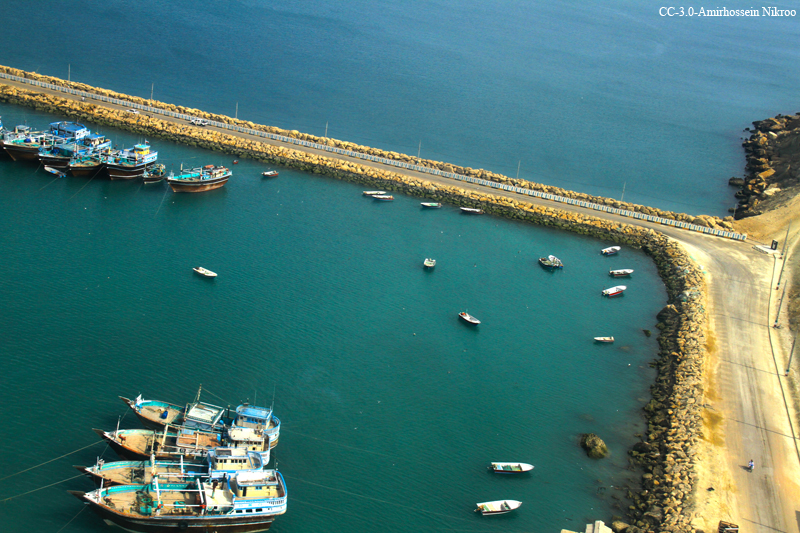
Boats anchored in Chabahar Bay

India and Iran have a long-standing agreement, signed in 2002, to develop Chabahar into a full deep sea port. The Bandar Abbas port handles 85% of Iran's seaborne trade and is highly congested, whereas Chabahar has a high capacity, with plans to expand it from its current capacity of 2.5 million to 12.5 million tons annually. Unlike Bandar Abbas, Chabahar has the ability to handle cargo ships bigger than 100,000 tons. Industry analysts have highlighted that there are long term plans to integrate Chabahar with the NSTC: "India is also eyeing trade with Europe via Chabahar port and the International North-South Transport Corridor".

=== Kazakhstan–Turkmenistan–Iran railway link (completed) ===
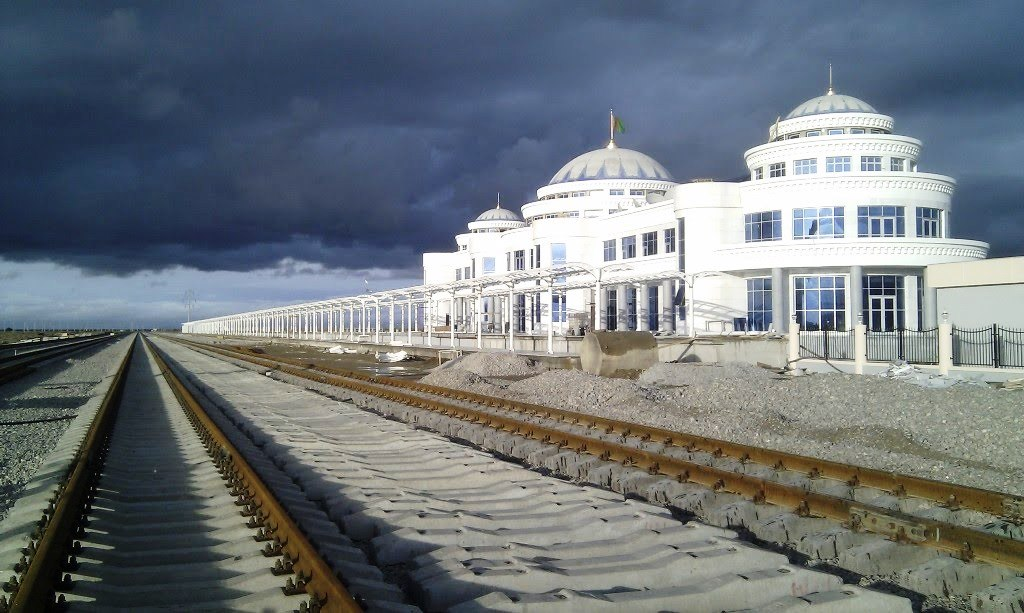
Bereket Railway Station in (Kazandzhik) is an important crossroad of the Trans-Caspian Railway and North-South Transnational Railway

The Kazakhstan–Turkmenistan–Iran railway link, completed and operationalized in 2014 and also known as the North–South Transnational Corridor, is a 677 km (421 mi) long railway line connecting Kazakhstan and Turkmenistan with Iran and the Persian Gulf. It links Uzen in Kazakhstan with Bereket - Etrek in Turkmenistan and ends at Gorgan in Iran's Golestan province. In Iran, the railway will be linked to the national network making its way to the ports of the Persian Gulf.

The project is estimated to cost $620m, which is being jointly funded by the governments of Kazakhstan, Turkmenistan, and Iran.

The project also aims to create a multimodal transport system to provide seamless connectivity in the region for passenger travel as well. The North-South Transnational Corridor will run up to 137 km (85 mi) in Kazakhstan, 470 km (292 mi) in Turkmenistan, and 70 km (43 mi) in Iran.

Work in Turkmenistan commenced in Bereket in December 2007 and in Kazakhstan in July 2009.

A 311 km (193 mi) section between Bereket and Uzen in Turkmenistan is being financed by the Asian Development Bank (ADB). A memorandum of understanding was signed between ADB and the Turkmenistan government in February 2010 for a $350m loan as a special fund for technical assistance. The project loan was for the installation of signalling and communication equipment on the ongoing railway line, procurement of equipment and maintenance facilities, consulting, and for the management and supervision of construction. The project also received a loan of $371.2m from the Islamic Development Bank in July 2010. In May 2013, a Bereket – Uzen section was completed.

A 256-kilometer (159-mile) section connecting Bereket and Etrek was completed in February 2014. The infrastructure project included the construction of nine stations along the new section—such as Däneata, Dövletýar, Bugdaýly, Balguýi, Madaw, and Akjadepe—along with locomotive transfer and maintenance hubs. On December 3, 2014, the heads of state of Iran, Turkmenistan, and Kazakhstan attended the official opening and full operation of the entire transnational railroad link.

Bereket city (Kazandjik) is a strategically important railway crossroad of the Trans-Caspian railway (Caspian Sea, Turkmenistan, Uzbekistan, and eastern Kazakhstan) and the North-South Transnational Railway. The city has a large locomotive repair depot and a modern passenger and freight railway station.

The railway was opened in December 2014.

== Current status ==
- 2017: A dry run of container movement via the green corridor was conducted during April 2017 to test and verify the smooth customs facilitation, connecting India with Russia and Europe via Iran.
- 2022: Russian company RZD Logistics announced on 7 July 2022 that it has successfully completed its first transport of goods to India via the INSTC. This statement was also confirmed by Iranian and Indian trade companies.

== See also ==
- Asia-Africa Growth Corridor
- India–Middle East–Europe Economic Corridor
- Related networks
  - India's International connectivity projects
  - Asian Highway Network
    - Transport in India
    - Transport in Russia
    - Transport in Iran
    - Transport in Armenia
    - Transport in Azerbaijan
    - Transport in Turkmenistan
  - Rail
    - Rail transport in India
    - Rail transport in Russia
    - Rail transport in Iran
    - Rail transport in Armenia
    - Rail transport in Azerbaijan
    - Rail transport in Turkmenistan
