= Bereket =

City in Balkan Province, Turkmenistan

Bereket Bereket şäheri
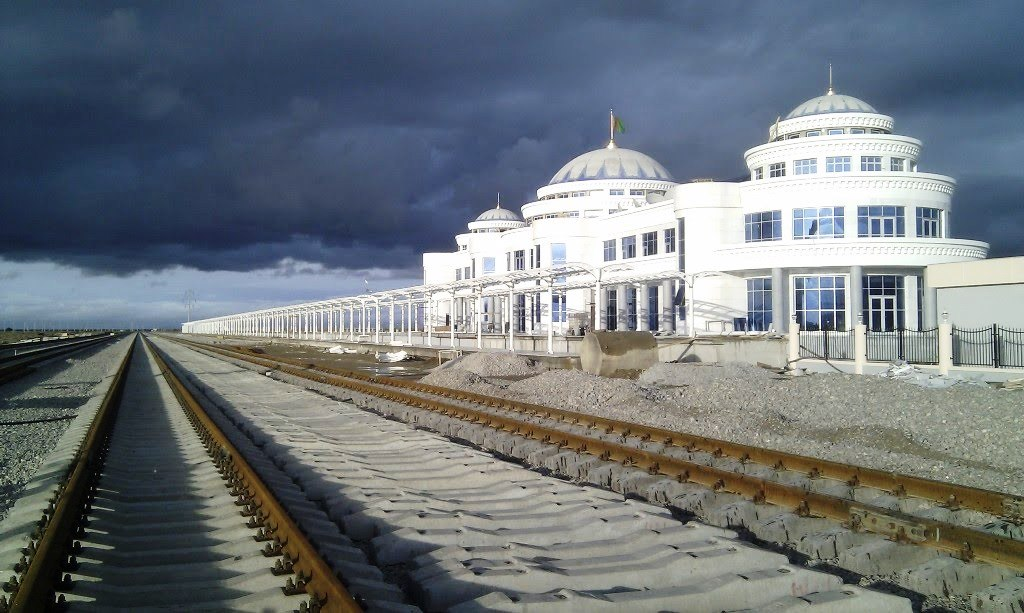
- New Railway station in Bereket city, opened in 2014 (Bereket II)

- Location in Turkmenistan
- Coordinates: 39°14′35″N 55°31′01″E
- Country: Turkmenistan
- Province: Balkan Province
- District: Bereket District
- Established: 1895

Government
  - Häkim: Nurahmet Gylyjov

Area
  - City: 18.632 km^{2} (7.194 sq mi)
  - Urban: 9.342 km^{2} (3.607 sq mi)
- Elevation: 205 m (673 ft)

Population (2022 official census)
  - City: 23,697
  - Density: 1,272/km^{2} (3,290/sq mi)
- Time zone: +5 GMT
- Postal code: 745130
- Area code: +(993) 247 XX XXX

Bereket, before 1999 Gazanjyk or Kazandzhik (Russian: Казанджик or Turkmen: Газанҗык gɑˈzɑnd͡ʒik), is a city in Balkan Province in western Turkmenistan. Bereket is the administrative centre of Bereket District.

Bereket is located in an oasis in the foothills of the Kopetdag Mountains and on the edge of the Karakum Desert.

Bereket is a strategic junction of the Trans-Caspian Railway (Caspian Sea-Turkmenistan-Uzbekistan-Kazakhstan) and North-South Transnational Railway (Russia-Kazakhstan-Turkmenistan-Iran-Persian Gulf.

The city has a large locomotive repair depot and a modern railway station.

The city is located approximately 260 km (162 mi) west of the Turkmen capital of Ashgabat and 340 km (211 mi) east of the Caspian Sea port of Turkmenbashy. The largest cities nearby are Balkanabat 120 km (75 mi) to the west, and Serdar 90 km (56 mi) to the east.

In 2022, it had a population of 23,697 people.

== Etymology ==
The city's pre-1999 name Gazanjyk is probably derived from the Turkic language word gazan or kazan (meaning a large cooking pot used throughout Central Asia, roughly equivalent to a cauldron) and -jyk, a suffix to denote "small in size". The name can be translated into English as "small cauldron". Atanyyazow notes that Gazanjyk is the name of a spring near the city, and it was named after its shape.

On 29 December 1999, by Parliamentary Resolution XM-66, the city and district (etrap) of Gazanjyk were renamed Bereket. Bereket means in the Turkmen language abundance or prosperity. The word bereket is borrowed from the Persian word Barakat (برکت), which in turn is borrowed from the Arabic Barakah (برکة).

== History ==
Since ancient times the area where city is now located was known as an important junction on the Silk Road that connected China with the Middle East and Europe.

Aleksey Kuropatkin, the Imperial Russian Army commander of the Turkestan Rifle Brigade, who led an 18-day march in 1880–1881 across 800 kilometres (500 mi) of Karakum Desert, wrote in his memoirs,

"...the 5th transition to Kazanjyk – 64 miles [103 km]. A waterless road. The soil is sandy, clayey, alkaline; there are sparse clumps of weeds and even sparser haloxylon trees four feet in height. This transition separates the Balkan mountains from Kyurendag. Gazanjyk wells lie in the gorge of the Kyurendag mountains, along the stream of a small river. Water in the wells is fresh and of good quality."

After the conquest of Transcaspian Oblast the Russian Empire started to build the Trans-Caspian railway including towns and settlements along the route. Gazanjyk, as an urban settlement, was founded in 1895 to serve as an important junction on the railway. Gazanjyk was classified as a town until 1939, when it was upgraded to the status of a city.

Between 1916 and 1924 Gazanjyk and the surrounding area were the scene of furious battles between Russian Imperial forces, and after 1918 the Soviet Red Army, and local nationalist Muslims of the Basmachi movement.

During Soviet period the 61631st Army garrison was built on the outskirts of the city. In 1988 it was the station of the 231st tank regiment, the 160th motorized rifle regiment and the 405th artillery regiment.

The December 2000 Turkmenistan earthquake (7.0 on the moment magnitude scale) devastated the city centre.

== Geography ==
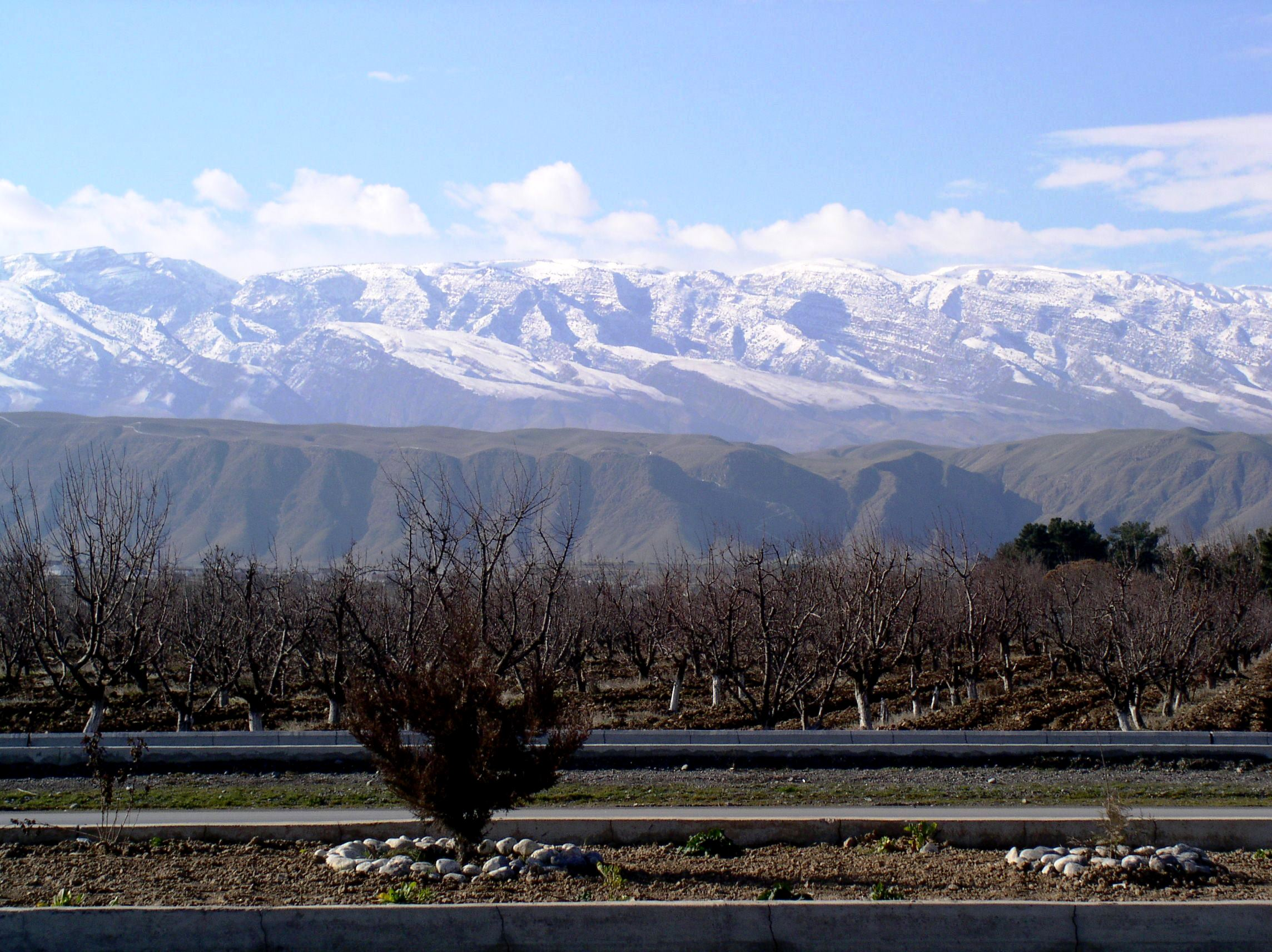
Kopetdag mountains in early spring, a view from Bereket city.

See satellite image of Bereket.

The city is located on the westernmost foothills of the Kopetdag mountains, called Kyurendag, on the edge of the Karakum deserts. he maximum height of the Kyurendag ridge is 968 m (3,176 ft). The vegetation of the ridge is quite poor and is represented primarily by species of desert flora: sagebrush, semi-desert and dry steppe and rocky outcroppings. Soils are grey soils. One can occasionally find juniper trees, single or large groups of tamarisk and small shrubs.

Wildlife in recent years has become greatly impoverished. Ungulates are few in number. Argali sheep are seen occasionally, as are bezoar goats, wild boar, and gazelles. Predators include wolves, jackals, foxes, and hyenas. Among birds klik are rarely seen and stone curlews and jacks very rarely. Reptile species are represented by the steppe tortoise, monitor lizard, boa, agam, etc.

The major source of water for irrigation is the Karakum Canal, which runs dry near Bereket and delivers water to points west via a pipeline.

== Demographics ==
The city is divided into several neighbourhoods, called by the traditional name for a semi-nomadic village, aul. The majority of the inhabitants are Turkmen from the Yomud tribes, with a minority of Teke. Previously strong communities of Azeris, Armenians, Russians, Ukrainians and Persians are now reduced to several families. In the 1990s most of them migrated to larger cities for better economic opportunities. Many Russian families also emigrated to the Russian Federation.

== Economy ==
The city is the semi-industrial and semi-agricultural centre of Bereket District. It is an important railway and automobile junction, the city has a large railroad yard and locomotive repair depot, a brick yard, Turkmen carpet weaving factory, wheat and cotton processing and storage facilities. Animal husbandry (camels, cows, sheep) is another source of income.

In September 2014 a poultry complex with production capacity of 8 million eggs and 1000 tons of poultry meat a year was constructed.

== Finance ==
The State Commercial Bank Dayhanbank has a branch in Bereket.

== Communication ==
The postal code for the city is 745130. The city has mobile coverage from the state-owned Altyn Asyr.

== City and national transportation ==
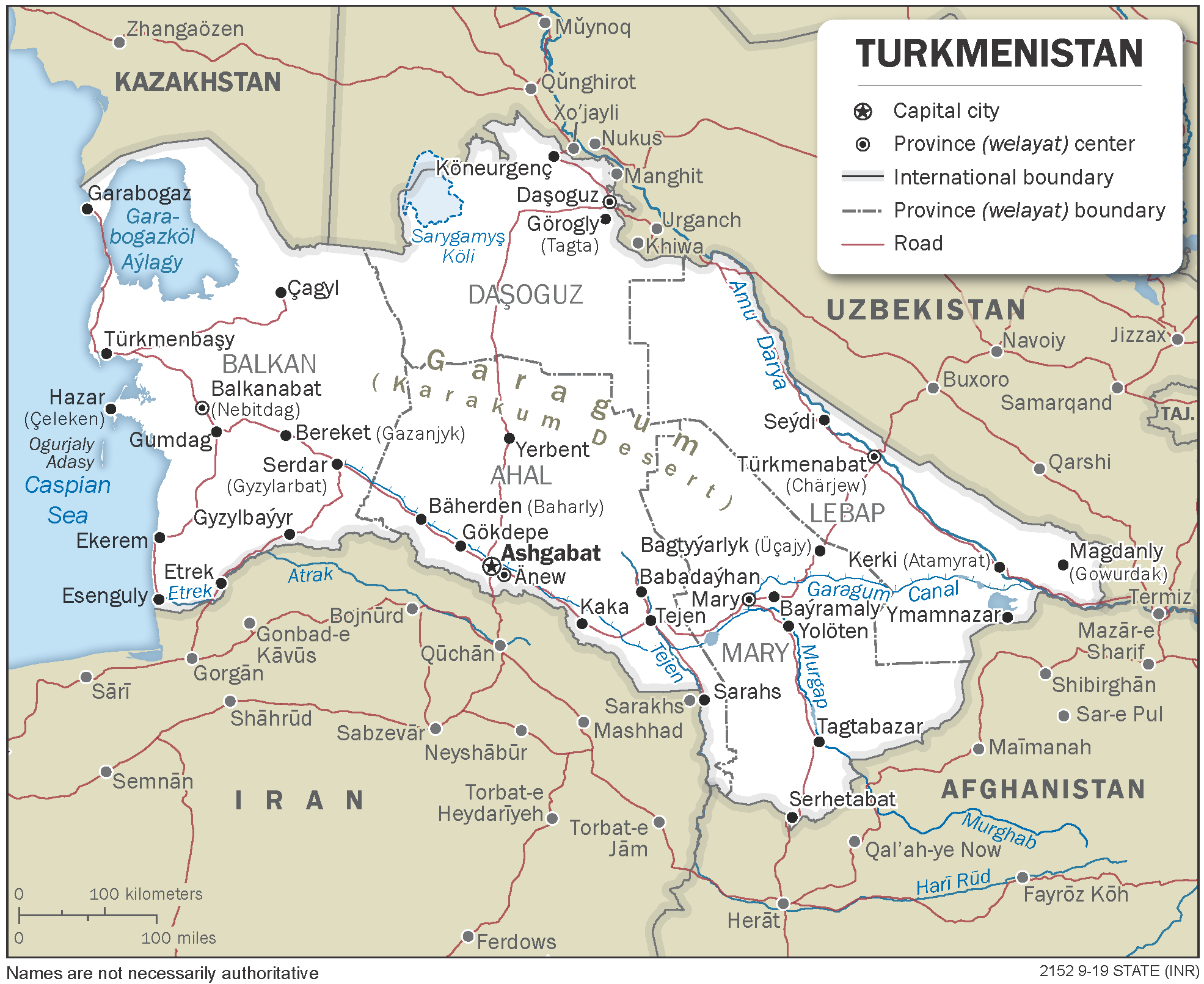
Bereket is an important railway junction on the Turkmenistan national railway system.

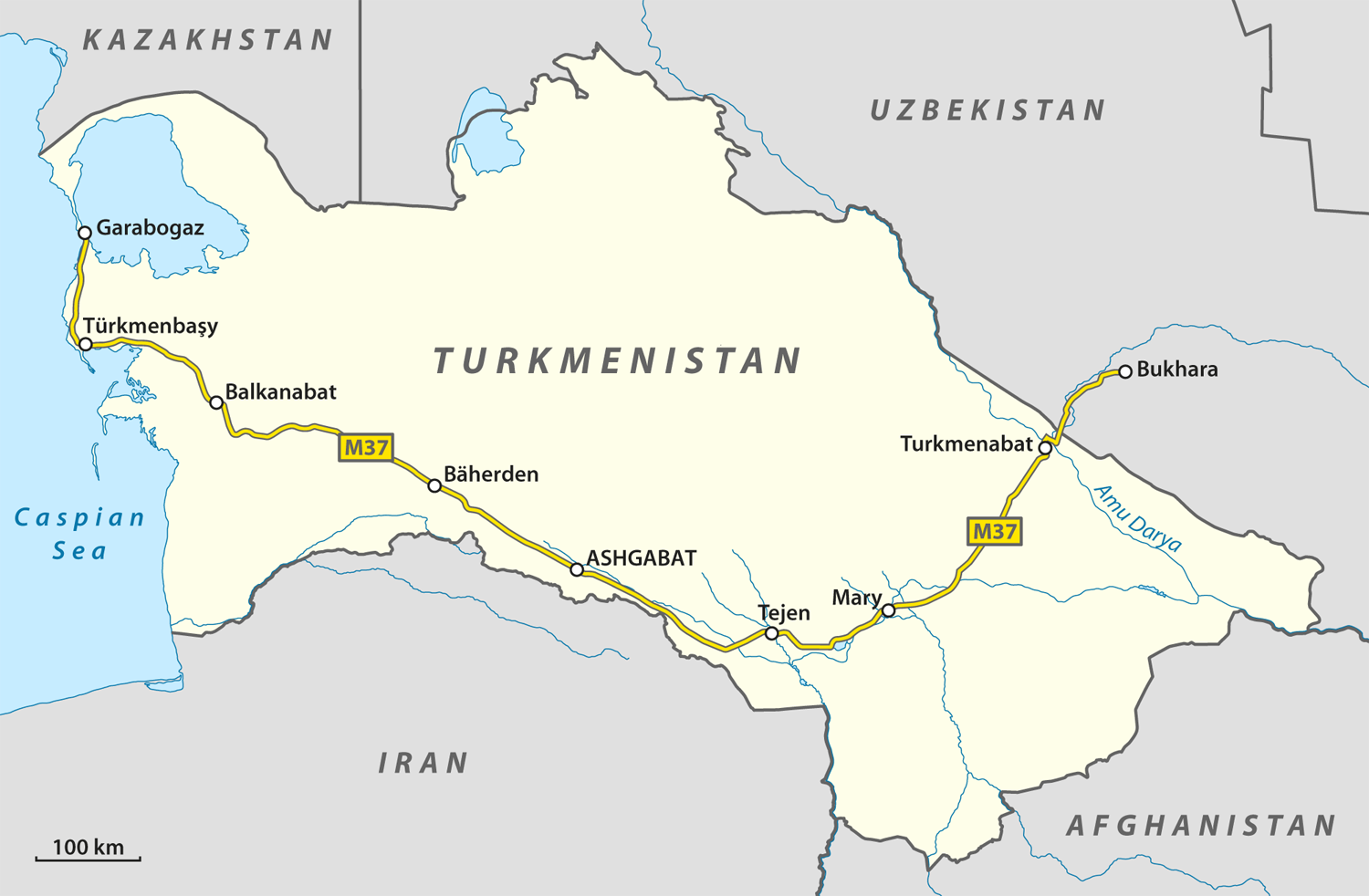
Bereket is located on the M37 Highway, Turkmenistan section.

The city has a small public transportation network. Several small buses run scheduled routes connecting the eastern and western parts of the city (some 5–6 km.)

Bereket is an important railway junction and station for commercial and freight transportation on the Turkmenistan national railway system.

== Role in transnational transportation ==
Bereket is a strategically important junction of the Trans-Caspian Railway (Caspian Sea, Turkmenistan, Uzbekistan and eastern Kazakhstan) and North-South Transnational Railway (Russia-Kazakhstan-Turkmenistan-Iran-Persian Gulf). The city has a large locomotive repair depot and a modern passenger railway station.

The Kazakhstan-Turkmenistan-Iran railway link is part of the North–South Transport Corridor and is a 677 km (421 mi) long railway line connecting Kazakhstan and Turkmenistan with Iran and the Persian Gulf. It links Uzen in Kazakhstan with Bereket–Etrek in Turkmenistan and ends at Gorgan in Iran's Golestan province. In Iran, the railway is linked to the national network making its way to the ports of the Persian Gulf. The project is estimated to have cost $620 million, which was jointly funded by the governments of Kazakhstan, Turkmenistan and Iran.

In May 2013, the 311 km (193 mi) Bereket – Uzen section of the North-South Transnational Railway was completed. In February 2014 256 km (159 mi) long section between Bereket and Etrek was completed. Currently railway stations along the new railway are being constructed such as Däneata, Dövletýar, Bugdaýly, Balguýi, Madaw, Akjadepe.

The Kazakhstan-Turkmenistan-Iran railway link was officially inaugurated in October 2014.

The city is located on the M37 Highway (Turkmenistan's section of the European route E60 which connects Brest, France to Irkeshtam, Kyrgyzstan on the border with the People's Republic of China).

== Education, health, culture ==
The city has three public schools, kindergartens, a small hospital, and medical emergency centre.

In 2012 several new buildings were constructed within the State Development Program including the mayor's office (häkimlik), two schools, a hotel, cultural center, a hospital and a knitting factory.

Until 2000, the city had a library, two open-air and one winter cinema. All are currently closed.

== Climate ==
Bereket has a cool desert climate (Köppen BWk), with generally chilly winters and very hot summers. Rainfall is generally light and erratic, and occurs mainly in the winter and autumn months. In summer, day temperatures may reach between 42 and 44 °C (107.6 and 111.2 °F), and during nights fall to between 15 and 18 °C (59.0 and 64.4 °F). The air flow is windy, chilly in winters and dusty in summers.

Climate data for Bereket (1991–2020)
Month	Jan	Feb	Mar	Apr	May	Jun	Jul	Aug	Sep	Oct	Nov	Dec	Year
Record high °C (°F)	26.0 (78.8)	28.3 (82.9)	35.4 (95.7)	41.2 (106.2)	43.2 (109.8)	47.4 (117.3)	48.0 (118.4)	48.0 (118.4)	42.8 (109.0)	37.9 (100.2)	32.0 (89.6)	25.0 (77.0)	48.0 (118.4)
Mean daily maximum °C (°F)	7.9 (46.2)	9.8 (49.6)	16.9 (62.4)	24.1 (75.4)	31.1 (88.0)	36.7 (98.1)	38.8 (101.8)	38.0 (100.4)	32.2 (90.0)	24.1 (75.4)	14.5 (58.1)	8.7 (47.7)	23.6 (74.5)
Daily mean °C (°F)	3.0 (37.4)	4.4 (39.9)	10.5 (50.9)	17.1 (62.8)	24.1 (75.4)	29.6 (85.3)	32.2 (90.0)	31.1 (88.0)	25.1 (77.2)	16.9 (62.4)	8.9 (48.0)	4.0 (39.2)	17.4 (63.3)
Mean daily minimum °C (°F)	−0.8 (30.6)	0.2 (32.4)	5.3 (41.5)	11.2 (52.2)	17.3 (63.1)	22.7 (72.9)	25.6 (78.1)	24.0 (75.2)	18.4 (65.1)	10.8 (51.4)	4.4 (39.9)	0.5 (32.9)	11.6 (52.9)
Record low °C (°F)	−21.1 (−6.0)	−23.7 (−10.7)	−4.5 (23.9)	0.2 (32.4)	3.6 (38.5)	10.8 (51.4)	15.9 (60.6)	14.6 (58.3)	7.3 (45.1)	−0.5 (31.1)	−13.5 (7.7)	−14.8 (5.4)	−23.7 (−10.7)
Average precipitation mm (inches)	16.9 (0.67)	27.2 (1.07)	35.6 (1.40)	25.2 (0.99)	16.8 (0.66)	4.8 (0.19)	5.6 (0.22)	3.6 (0.14)	3.7 (0.15)	13.0 (0.51)	22.8 (0.90)	18.5 (0.73)	193.9 (7.63)
Average precipitation days (≥ 1.0 mm)	11.2	16.7	14.8	12.4	7.1	3.0	3.6	2.2	2.1	6.7	12.6	12.1	104.5
Source: NOAA

Climate data for Gazandzhyk weather station (WMO identifier: 38647), 31m amsl, 2005−2015 normals
Month	Jan	Feb	Mar	Apr	May	Jun	Jul	Aug	Sep	Oct	Nov	Dec	Year
Average relative humidity (%) (daily average)	73	73	58	52	40	30	30	26	30	46	65	75	50
Average dew point °C (°F)	−3 (27)	−1 (30)	2 (36)	6 (43)	9 (48)	10 (50)	11 (52)	9 (48)	5 (41)	4 (39)	2 (36)	−1 (30)	4 (40)
Source: Time and Date

== Sightseeing ==
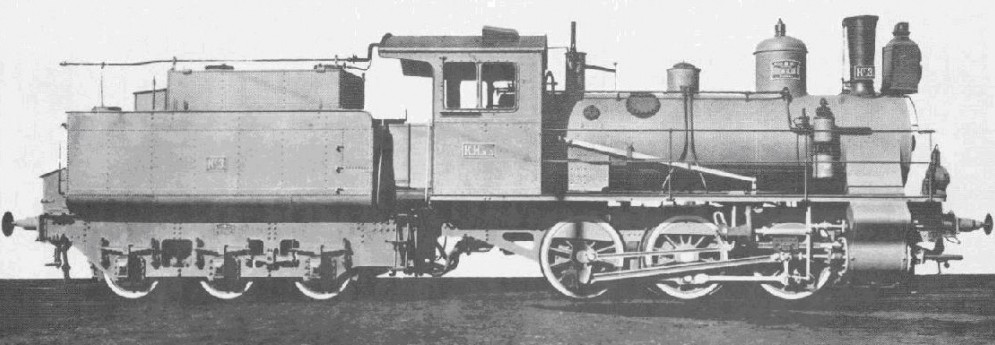
Bereket Railway Depot owns a Russian made class T locomotive ТЭ-189 (built between 1857 and 1915).

In its storage area, the Bereket Depot museum, has a relic Russian made class T locomotive ТЭ-189 (built between 1857 and 1915).

FD class steam locomotives ФД20-2526, ФД20–2494 (ФД20–1441) (built between 1931 and 1942), and Russian class E locomotives Эр796-88, Эм734–66 (Эм733–96), Эу705–41, Эм725–30, Э-13 (built between 1912 and 1957).

There are also several ТЭ1 class locomotives, whose prototype was the famous US made ALCO RSD-1 locomotive.

== Bereket Railway Station ==
Bereket Railway Station (Turkmen: Bereket demirýol menzili) is the main railway station in the city. It was built in 1885. The station is operated by the Türkmendemirýollary.

== See also ==
- Bereket District
- Balkan Province
- List of cities in Turkmenistan
- List of cities, towns and villages in Turkmenistan
