= List of earthquakes in 2007 =

Earthquakes in 2007
Approximate epicenters of notable earthquakes in 2007
- 4.0–5.9 magnitude
- 6.0–6.9 magnitude
- 7.0–7.9 magnitude
- 8.0+ magnitude
- Strongest: 8.4 M_{w} Indonesia
- Deadliest: 8.0 M_{w} (Peru) Peru; 595 deaths
- Total fatalities: 795

Number by magnitude
- 9.0+: 0

Earthquakes in 2007 resulted in many fatalities. The 2007 Peru earthquake was the deadliest with 595 fatalities. The September 2007 Sumatra earthquake was the largest in 2007 with an 8.4 on the moment magnitude scale. The 2007 Solomon Islands earthquake caused a significant tsunami that killed 52 people. There were four 8.0+ earthquakes in 2007 which is the most ever recorded for a single year. Other significant earthquakes in 2007 struck Chile and Japan.

== Compared to other years ==
Number of earthquakes worldwide for 1999–2009 []
Magnitude	1999	2000	2001	2002	2003	2004	2005	2006	2007	2008	2009
8.0–9.9	0	1	1	0	1	2	1	2	4	1	1
7.0–7.9	18	15	14	13	14	14	10	9	14	12	16
6.0–6.9	117	145	122	126	139	141	139	142	178	167	143
5.0–5.9	1,057	1,334	1,212	1,170	1,212	1,511	1,694	1,726	2,090	1,786	1,912
4.0–4.9	7,004	7,968	7,969	8,479	8,455	10,880	13,893	12,843	12,081	12,294	6,817
Total	8,296	9,462	9,319	9,788	9,823	12,551	15,738	14,723	14,367	14,261	8,891

== Overall ==
=== By death toll ===
Rank	Death toll	Magnitude	Location	MMI	Depth (km)	Date
1	595	8.0	Peru, Pisco	IX (Violent)	39.0	August 15
2	68	6.4	Indonesia, Sumatra	VIII (Severe)	10.0	March 6
3	52	8.1	Solomon Islands	VIII (Severe)	10.0	April 2
4	23	8.4	Indonesia, Sumatra	VI (Strong)	10.0	September 12
5	12	5.2	Tajikistan	VI (Strong)	10.0	July 21
6	11	6.6	Japan, Niigata	IX (Violent)	10.0	July 16
7	10	6.2	Chile, Aysén	VII (Very strong)	25.0	April 21

- Note: At least 10 dead

=== By magnitude ===
Rank	Magnitude	Death toll	Location	MMI	Depth (km)	Date
1	8.4	23	Indonesia, Bengkulu offshore	VI (Strong)	10.0	September 12
2	8.1	52	Solomon Islands offshore	VIII (Severe)	10.0	April 1
2	8.1	0	Russia, Kuril Islands offshore	VI (Strong)	5.6	January 13
4	8.0	595	Peru, Ica offshore	IX (Violent)	39.0	August 15
5	7.9	0	Indonesia, Mentawai Islands	VII (Very strong)	35.0	September 12
6	7.8	0	New Zealand, Kermadec Islands	VII (Very strong)	152.0	December 9
7	7.7	2	Chile, Tarapacá	VIII (Severe)	40.0	November 14
8	7.5	0	Indonesia, Jakarta offshore	V (Moderate)	280.0	August 8
8	7.5	0	Japan, Volcano Islands offshore	VI (Strong)	20.0	September 28
8	7.5	4	Indonesia, offshore Molucca Sea	IX (Violent)	20.0	January 21
11	7.4	0	New Zealand, Auckland Islands offshore	V (Moderate)	15.0	September 30
11	7.4	1	France, Martinique offshore	VII (Very strong)	10.0	November 29
13	7.2	0	Vanuatu, Santo offshore	VII (Very strong)	20.0	August 1
13	7.2	0	Solomon Islands, Santa Cruz Islands offshore	VI (Strong)	20.0	September 2
13	7.2	0	(Northern Mariana Islands) Mariana Islands offshore	III (Weak)	30.0	October 31
13	7.2	0	United States, Andreanof Islands offshore	VII (Very strong)	34.0	December 19
17	7.1	0	Vanuatu, Tanna offshore	VI (Strong)	30.0	March 25
18	7.0	0	Indonesia, Mentawai Islands offshore	VII (Very strong)	10.0	September 13

- Note: At least 7.0 Magnitude

== By month ==
=== January ===
January
- Strongest: 8.1 M_{w} Russia
- Deadliest: 7.5 M_{w} (Indonesia) Indonesia; 4 deaths
- Total fatalities: 4

Number by magnitude
- 8.0–8.9: 1
- 7.0–7.9: 1
- 6.0–6.9: 11

Date	Country and location	M_{w}	Depth (km)	MMI	Notes	Casualties	
Date	Country and location	M_{w}	Depth (km)	MMI	Notes	Dead	Injured
8	India, Andaman and Nicobar Islands offshore, 395 km (245 mi) S of Port Blair.	6.1	11.0	-	-	-	-
8	Kyrgyzstan, Batken, 23 km (14 mi) WSW of Vorukh, Tajikistan.	6.0	16.0	VII	About 130 houses destroyed and a mining complex damaged in Isfana. At least 57 buildings damaged in Vorukh.	-	-
8	Fiji.	6.3	406.8	-	-	-	-
9	China, Gansu, 57 km (35 mi) NNW of Baiyin.	4.5	20.0	IV	At least 2,000 buildings damaged in the epicenter area.	-	-
11	China, Jilin, 130 km (81 mi) S of Mawu.	4.7	23.1	IV	Several buildings collapsed in the epicentral area.	-	-
11	Indonesia, Maluku offshore, 100 km (62 mi) W of Ambon.	6.0	13.0	VI	-	-	-
13	Russia, Sakhalin offshore, 506 km (314 mi) SSW of Severo-Kuril’sk.	8.1	10.0	VI	Further information: 2007 Kuril Islands Earthquake	-	-
13	Russia, Sakhalin offshore, 418 km (260 mi) S of Severo-Kuril’sk.	6.0	10.0	-	Aftershock of the 2007 Kuril Islands Earthquake.	-	-
17	Indonesia, Papua, 119 km (74 mi) SW of Abepura.	6.0	100.8	V	-	-	-
17	Carlsberg Ridge.	6.2	8.0	-	-	-	-
20	South Georgia and the South Sandwich Islands, South Sandwich Islands region.	6.2	10.0	-	-	-	-
21	Indonesia, North Maluku offshore, 126 km (78 mi) WNW of Ternate.	7.5	22.0	VI	Minor damage in Manado.	4	4
21	Indonesia, North Maluku offshore, 119 km (74 mi) WNW of Ternate.	6.2	23.0	-	Aftershock of the previous earthquake.	-	-
21	Turkey, Ağrı, 10 km (6.2 mi) W of Hamur.	5.2	3.1	VI	Two people injured. Some damage to old buildings was reported in Ağrı.	-	2
25	Taiwan, Taitung offshore, 136 km (85 mi) ENE of Hengchun.	6.0	36.2	IV	-	-	-
30	Australia, west of Macquarie Island.	6.9	11.0	-	-	-	-
30	Northern Mariana Islands offshore, Maug Islands region.	6.6	20.0	-	-	-	-
31	New Zealand, Kermadec Islands offshore.	6.5	34.0	-	-	-	-

=== February ===
February
- Strongest: 6.7 M_{w} Indonesia

Number by magnitude
- 8.0–8.9: 0
- 7.0–7.9: 0
- 6.0–6.9: 5

Date	Country and location	M_{w}	Depth (km)	MMI	Notes	Casualties	
Date	Country and location	M_{w}	Depth (km)	MMI	Notes	Dead	Injured

- A magnitude 6.2 earthquake struck Lucea, Jamaica on February 4 at a depth of 10.0 km (6.2 mi).
- A magnitude 6.2 earthquake struck the Iberian Peninsula, Portugal on February 12 at a depth of 20.0 km (12.4 mi).
- A magnitude 4.9 earthquake struck Davao, Philippines on February 16 at a depth of 78.9 km (49.0 mi). Minor damage was caused to an apartment in Davao City.
- A magnitude 6.0 earthquake struck Hokkaido, Japan on February 17 at a depth of 31.0 km (19.3 mi).
- A magnitude 6.7 earthquake struck Sofifi, Indonesia on February 20 at a depth of 12.0 km (7.5 mi).
- A magnitude 5.7 earthquake struck Elazığ, Turkey on February 22 at a depth of 6.0 km (3.7 mi). Some buildings were damaged in Elazığ, and Pütürge.
- A magnitude 6.3 earthquake struck Pimentel, Peru on February 24 at a depth of 23.0 km (14.3 mi).

=== March ===
March
- Strongest: 7.2 M_{w} Vanuatu
- Deadliest: 6.4 M_{w} (Indonesia) Indonesia; 68 deaths
- Total fatalities: 69

Number by magnitude
- 8.0–8.9: 0
- 7.0–7.9: 1
- 6.0–6.9: 9

- Two events with magnitudes 6.4 and 6.3 struck Sumatra, Indonesia on March 6 at a depth of 11.0 km (6.8 mi), 68 people were killed and 460 People were Injured.
- A magnitude 5.2 earthquake struck Caqueta, Colombia on March 6 at a depth of 43.1 km (26.8 mi). Nine people were injured, eight buildings were destroyed and 63 damaged in Caqueta.
- A magnitude 6.1 earthquake struck the Izu Islands, Japan on March 8 at a depth of 139.6 km (86.7 mi).
- (South Georgia and the South Sandwich Islands) A magnitude 6.2 earthquake struck the South Sandwich Islands on March 8 at a depth of 10.0 km (6.2 mi).
- A magnitude 6.0 earthquake struck Sergeyevka, Primorsky Krai, Russia on March 9 at a depth of 441.2 km (274.1 mi).
- (Mexico) A magnitude 6.0 earthquake struck The Gulf of California on March 13 at a depth of 26.1 km (16.2 mi).
- A magnitude 6.2 earthquake struck Buenaventura, Colombia on March 18 at a depth of 7.0 km (4.3 mi).
- A magnitude 7.2 earthquake struck Isangel, Vanuatu on March 25 at a depth of 34.0 km (21.1 mi). A tsunami up to 16 cm Was Observed.
- A magnitude 6.9 earthquake struck Noto, Japan on March 25 at a depth of 8.0 km (5.0 mi). One person was killed, 359 people were injured, and 13,556 buildings damaged or destroyed, as well as a tsunami up to 22 cm high.
- A magnitude 6.9 earthquake struck Vanuatu on March 25 at a depth of 35.0 km (21.7 mi).
- A magnitude 5.7 earthquake struck Ionian Islands, Greece on March 6 at a depth of 15.0 km (9.3 mi). Some buildings were damaged and rockslides occurred in Argostolion.

=== April ===
April
- Strongest: 8.1 M_{w} Solomon Islands
- Deadliest: 8.1 M_{w} (Solomon Islands) Solomon Islands; 52 deaths
- Total fatalities: 62

Number by magnitude
- 8.0–8.9: 1
- 7.0–7.9: 0
- 6.0–6.9: 13

- A magnitude 8.1 earthquake struck the Solomon Islands on April 1, at a depth of 10.0 km (6.2 mi), A 12 m high tsunami high killed 112 people.
- A magnitude 6.9 earthquake struck Panguna, Papua New Guinea on April 1 at a depth of 10.0 km (6.2 mi).
- A magnitude 6.1 earthquake struck Coihaique, Chile on April 2 at a depth of 4.9 km (3.0 mi).
- A magnitude 6.2 earthquake struck Jurm, Afghanistan on April 3 at a depth of 222.1 km (138.0 mi).
- A magnitude 6.2 earthquake struck Tadine, New Caledonia on April 4 at a depth of 13.0 km (8.1 mi).
- A magnitude 6.3 earthquake struck Povoação, Portugal on April 5 at a depth of 14.0 km (8.7 mi).
- A magnitude 6.1 earthquake struck Sinabang, Indonesia on April 7 at a depth of 30.0 km (18.6 mi).
- (Antarctica) A magnitude 6.0 earthquake struck the Balleny Islands on April 12 at a depth of 10.0 km (6.2 mi).
- A magnitude 6.0 earthquake struck El Paraíso, Mexico on April 13 at a depth of 34.0 km (21.1 mi), Two houses were damaged in Atoyac, and power outages occurred in Mexico City.
- (Australia) A magnitude 6.4 earthquake struck Macquarie Island on April 16, at a depth of 10.0 km (6.2 mi).
- A magnitude 6.4 earthquake struck Hirara, Japan on April 20 at a depth of 9.0 km (5.6 mi).
- A magnitude 5.1 earthquake struck Mie Prefecture, Japan on April 15 at a depth of 15.7 km (9.8 mi). 12 people were injured and 63 buildings were damaged in the Mie-Nara-Shiga area.
- A magnitude 6.1 earthquake struck Kavieng, Papua New Guinea on April 21 at a depth of 407.4 km (253.1 mi).
- A magnitude 6.2 earthquake struck Aisén Fjord, Chile on April 21 at a depth of 36.7 km (22.8 mi), 10 people were killed from a 7.6 metre high tsunami triggered by an underwater landslide.
- (United Kingdom) A magnitude 4.3 earthquake struck Kent, England on April 28 at a depth of 4.3 km (2.7 mi), 2 people were injured.
- A magnitude 6.2 earthquake struck Adak, Alaska on April 29 at a depth of 117.0 km (72.7 mi).

=== May ===
May
- Strongest: 6.5 M_{w} Fiji

Number by magnitude
- 8.0–8.9: 0
- 7.0–7.9: 0
- 6.0–6.9: 6

- A magnitude 6.1 earthquake struck Tibet, China on May 5 at a depth of 9.0 km (5.6 mi). Some buildings were damaged in Tibet.
- A magnitude 6.5 earthquake struck Levuka, Fiji on May 6 at a depth of 676.4 km (420.3 mi).
- A magnitude 6.1 earthquake struck Aisen, Chile on May 7 at a depth of 10.0 km (6.2 mi).
- A magnitude 4.4 earthquake struck Alder, Montana on May 8 at a depth of 13.5 km (8.4 mi). Some buildings were slightly damaged in Sheridan.
- A magnitude 6.3 earthquake struck Huay Xai, Laos on May 16 at a depth of 9.0 km (5.6 mi). Several buildings were damaged as far away as Thailand.
- A magnitude 6.0 earthquake struck The Kermadec Islands, New Zealand on May 17 at a depth of 40.7 km (25.3 mi).
- A magnitude 6.4 earthquake struck Kamchatka, Russia on May 30 at a depth of 116.0 km (72.1 mi).

=== June ===
June
- Strongest: 6.7 M_{w} Guatemala
- Deadliest: 6.1 M_{w} (China) China; 3 deaths
- Total fatalities: 3

Number by magnitude
- 8.0–8.9: 0
- 7.0–7.9: 0
- 6.0–6.9: 5

- A magnitude 6.1 earthquake struck Jinghong, China on June 2 at a depth of 5.0 km (3.1 mi), 3 people were killed and 329 were injured.
- A magnitude 6.2 earthquake struck Lorengau, Papua New Guinea on June 7 at a depth of 4.7 km (2.9 mi).
- A magnitude 6.7 earthquake struck Iztapa, Guatemala on June 13 at a depth of 16.0 km (9.9 mi). Some buildings were damaged in Guatemala City.
- A magnitude 5.5 earthquake struck Qom, Iran on June 18 at a depth of 5.0 km (3.1 mi). Some buildings were damaged slightly in Qom.
- A magnitude 6.5 earthquake struck the Mid-Atlantic Ridge on June 24 at a depth of 10.0 km (6.2 mi).
- A magnitude 6.6 earthquake struck Panguna, Papua New Guinea on June 28 at a depth of 18.0 km (11.2 mi).

=== July ===
July
- Strongest: 6.9 M_{w} Indonesia
- Deadliest: 5.2 M_{w} (Tajikistan) Tajikistan; 15 deaths
- Total fatalities: 26

Number by magnitude
- 8.0–8.9: 0
- 7.0–7.9: 0
- 6.0–6.9: 7

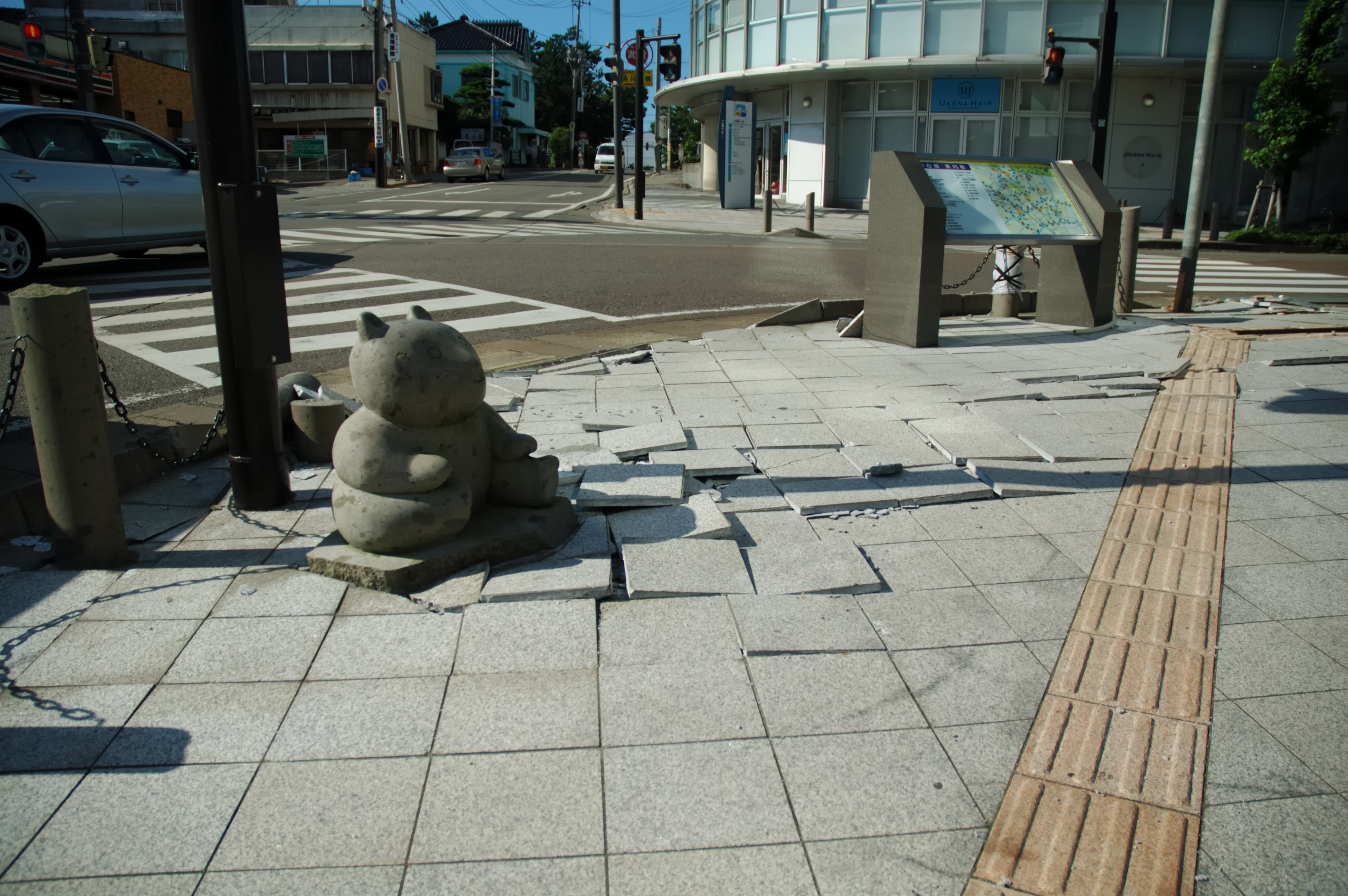
Damaged pavement tiles in Higashi-honcho, Kashiwazaki, Japan by the earthquake.

- A magnitude 6.1 earthquake struck Pucallpa, Peru on July 13 at a depth of 152.1 km (94.5 mi).
- A magnitude 4.5 earthquake struck Loja, Ecuador on July 12 at a depth of 49.9 km (31.0 mi). Some damage to houses was caused in Zaruma.
- (United States) A magnitude 6.1 earthquake struck Nikolski, Alaska on July 15 at a depth of 15.0 km (9.3 mi).
- A magnitude 6.6 earthquake struck Chūetsu, Japan on July 16 at a depth of 10.0 km (6.2 mi). Eleven people were killed, more than 1,000 were injured and a minor tsunami was triggered.
- A magnitude 6.8 earthquake struck Mikuni, Japan on July 15 at a depth of 350.4 km (217.7 mi).
- A magnitude 5.6 earthquake struck Xinjiang, China on July 20 at a depth of 10.0 km (6.2 mi). At least 2,120 houses and four bridges were damaged or destroyed.
- A magnitude 6.1 earthquake struck Tarauacá, Brazil on July 21 at a depth of 644.9 km (400.7 mi).
- A magnitude 5.2 earthquake struck Rasht, Tajikistan on July 21 at a depth of 10.0 km (6.2 mi). 15 people were killed, three by falling debris, 12 by a landslide.
- A magnitude 6.4 Earthquake struck near the Argentina-Bolivia border on July 21 at a depth of 289.5 km (179.9 mi).
- A magnitude 5.1 earthquake struck Uttarkhand, India on July 22 at a depth of 19 km (12 mi). Three people were injured and several buildings were damaged. Rockslides also occurred.
- A magnitude 6.9 earthquake struck Tobelo, Indonesia on July 26 at a depth of 25.0 km (15.5 mi). Around 5 people were injured.

=== August ===
August
- Strongest: 8.0 M_{w} Peru
- Deadliest: 8.0 M_{w} (Peru) Peru; 595 deaths
- Total fatalities: 621

Number by magnitude
- 8.0–8.9: 1
- 7.0–7.9: 2
- 6.0–6.9: 4

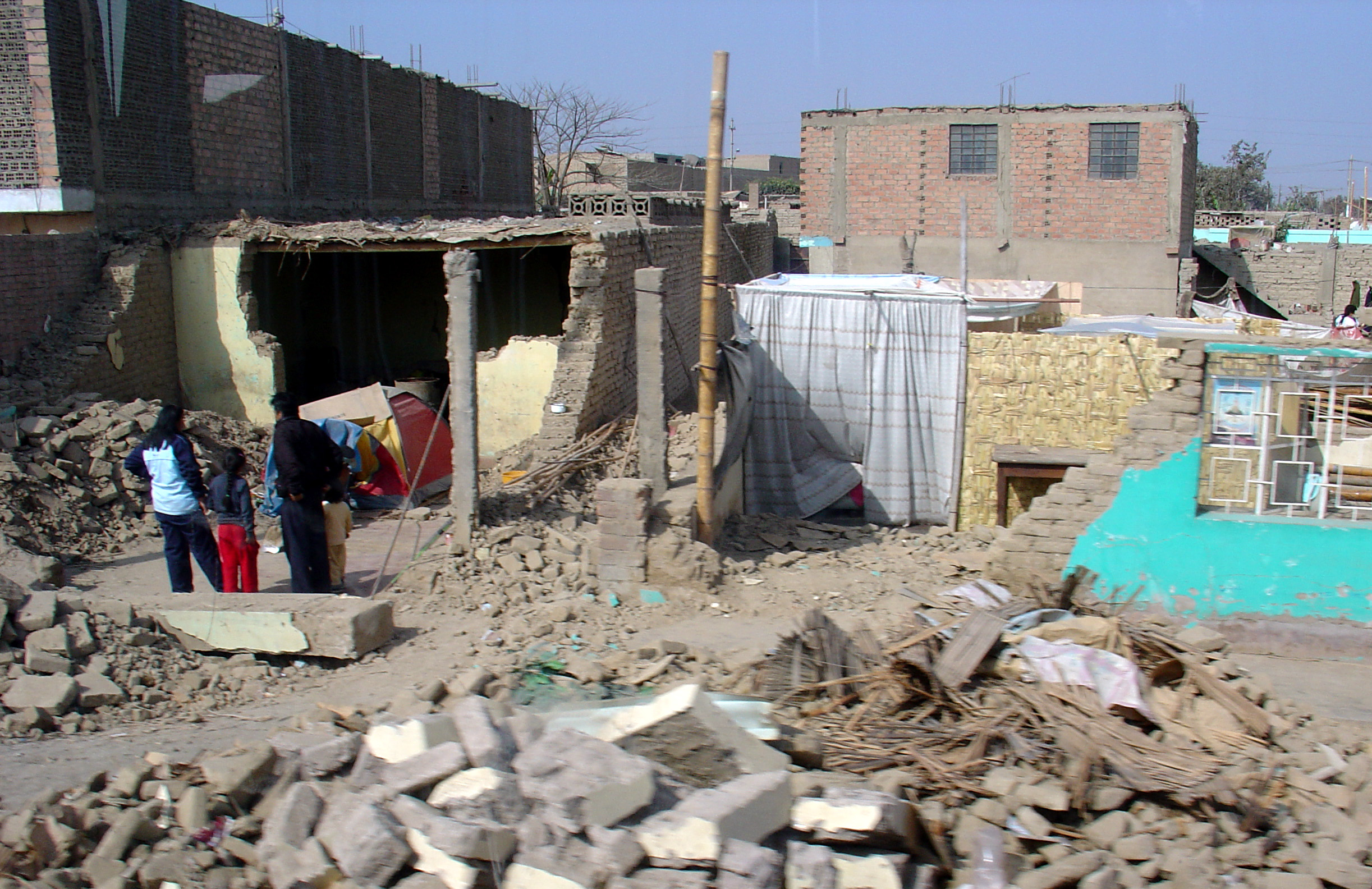
A pile of rubble after the earthquake in Peru.

Date	Country and location	M_{w}	Depth (km)	MMI	Notes	Casualties	
Date	Country and location	M_{w}	Depth (km)	MMI	Notes	Dead	Injured
1	Vanuatu, Penama offshore, 56 km (35 mi) E of Luganville.	7.2	120.0	VII	Some roads, buildings and a bridge were damaged in Luganville. A policeman suffered injuries while evacuating.	-	1
2	Russia, Sakhalin offshore, 20 km (12 mi) WSW of Yablochnyy.	6.2	5.0	VIII	Further Information: 2007 Nevelsk Earthquake	4	12
2	United States, Alaska offshore, 239 km (149 mi) WSW of Adak.	6.7	21.0	-	-	-	-
4	Central East Pacific Rise.	6.1	10.0	-	-	-	-
4	Russia, Sakhalin offshore, 6 km (3.7 mi) WSW of Nevelsk.	4.9	9.1	V	Aftershock of the 2007 Nevelsk Earthquake. At least 2 people injured.	-	2
5	Vanuatu, Tafea offshore, 73 km (45 mi) NW of Isangel.	6.0	40.0	IV	-	-	-
7	Japan, Okinawa offshore, 136 km (85 mi) WNW of Nago.	6.0	18.1	III	-	-	-
8	Indonesia, West Java offshore, 42 km (26 mi) NNW of Pamanukan.	6.1	291.2	IV	Foreshock of the 7.5 event.	-	-
8	Indonesia, West Java offshore, 35 km (22 mi) NNE of Rengasdengklok.	7.5	280.0	V	Some damage was caused in Sukabumi, such as cracks on walls. In the same regency, the walls of two schools collapsed.	-	-
12	Solomon Islands,Temotu offshore, 88 km (55 mi) SE of Lata.	6.0	42.0	-	-	-	-
13	Australia, west of Macquarie Island.	6.1	10.0	-	-	-	-
15	United States, Alaska offshore, 184 km (114 mi) SSW of Adak.	6.5	9.0	II	-	-	-
15	Peru, Lima offshore, 41 km (25 mi) SW of San Vicente de Cañete.	8.0	39.0	IX	Further information: 2007 Pisco Earthquake	595	2,291
16	Peru, Ica offshore, 46 km (29 mi) WSW of Santiago.	6.4	23.4	VII	Aftershock of the 2007 Pisco Earthquake.		
16	Solomon Islands, Guadalcanal offshore, 31 km (19 mi) WSW of Malango.	6.5	15.0	VI	-	-	-
16	Peru, Ica offshore, 46 km (29 mi) S of Paracas.	6.0	35.0	VI	Aftershock of the 2007 Pisco Earthquake.	-	-
17	Indonesia, Maluku offshore, 219 km (136 mi) SSE of Amahai.	6.4	10.0	-	-	-	-
18	Peru, Ica offshore, 7 km (4.3 mi) NNW of Paracas.	6.0	30.0	VI	Aftershock of the 2007 Pisco Earthquake.	-	-
20	Philippines, Davao offshore, 135 km (84 mi) E of Pondaguitan.	6.4	8.0	IV	-	-	-
20	Central Mid-Atlantic Ridge.	6.5	6.0	-	-	-	-
25	Iran, Kerman, 113 km (70 mi) NNE of Bandar Abbas.	5.0	10.0	VI	4 people injured in Haji Abad and Orzuiyeh.	-	4
26	Tonga, Vava'u offshore, 137 km (85 mi) NNW of Neiafu.	6.1	127.4	III	-	-	-

=== September ===
September
- Strongest: 8.4 M_{w} Indonesia
- Deadliest: 8.4 M_{w}, (Indonesia) Indonesia; 25 deaths
- Total fatalities: 25

Number by magnitude
- 8.0–8.9: 1
- 7.0–7.9: 5
- 6.0–6.9: 4

Date	Country and location	M_{w}	Depth (km)	MMI	Notes	Casualties	
Date	Country and location	M_{w}	Depth (km)	MMI	Notes	Dead	Injured
1	Mexico, Baja California Sur offshore, 100 km (62 mi) SW of Topolobampo.	6.1	9.0	IV	-	-	-
2	Solomon Islands,Temotu offshore, 97 km (60 mi) SSE of Lata.	7.2	35.0	V	-	-	-
2	Solomon Islands, Temotu offshore, 115 km (71 mi) SSE of Lata.	6.3	36.7	-	-	-	-
3	Russia, Sakhalin offshore, 183 km (114 mi) ENE of Kurilsk.	6.2	94.0	III	-	-	-
6	Taiwan, Yilan offshore, 66 km (41 mi) SE of Yilan.	6.2	53.0	V	At least one building was damaged in Lotung.	-	-
10	Colombia, Cauca offshore, 39 km (24 mi) WNW of Timbiquí.	6.8	15.0	VI	Five people injured in Nariño. Thirty-four houses damaged.	-	5
12	Indonesia, Bengkulu offshore, 122 km (76 mi) SW of Bengkulu.	8.4	34.0	VI	Further Information: 2007 Bengkulu Earthquakes	25	161
12	Indonesia, Bengkulu offshore, 87 km (54 mi) SW of Sungai Penuh.	7.9	35.0	VII	Further Information: 2007 Bengkulu Earthquakes	25	161
13	Indonesia, West Sumatra offshore, 112 km (70 mi) SW of Padang.	6.5	28.9	V	Aftershock of the 2007 Bengkulu Earthquakes.	-	-
13	Indonesia, West Sumatra, 153 km (95 mi) SSW of Padang.	7.0	22.0	VII	Aftershock of the 2007 Bengkulu Earthquakes.	-	-
13	Indonesia, North Sulawesi offshore, 202 km (126 mi) SSE of Sarangani, Philippines.	6.3	26.0	V	-	-	-
13	Indonesia, Bengkulu offshore, 107 km (66 mi) NW of Bengkulu.	6.0	53.0	V	Aftershock of the 2007 Bengkulu Earthquakes.	-	-
13	Pacific-Antarctic Ridge.	6.0	10.0	-	-	-	-
14	Indonesia, Bengkulu offshore, 125 km (78 mi) WSW of Bengkulu.	6.4	23.0	V	Aftershock of the 2007 Bengkulu Earthquakes.	-	-
19	Indonesia, Bengkulu offshore, 94 km (58 mi) SW of Sungai Penuh.	6.0	35.0	V	Aftershock of the 2007 Bengkulu Earthquakes.	-	-
20	Indonesia, West Sumatra, 118 km (73 mi) SSW of Padang.	6.7	30.0	V	Aftershock of the 2007 Bengkulu Earthquakes.	-	-
25	New Zealand, Kermadec Islands region.	6.2	416.7	-	-	-	-
26	Papua New Guinea, New Ireland offshore, 154 km (96 mi) ESE of Kokopo.	6.8	40.0	V	-	-	-
26	Indonesia, West Sumatra, 133 km (83 mi) SW of Padang.	6.1	26.0	V	-	-	-
27	Vanuatu, Tafea offshore, 153 km (95 mi) ENE of Tadine, New Caledonia.	6.1	9.0	-	-	-	-
28	Vanuatu, Tafea offshore, 158 km (98 mi) ENE of Tadine, New Caledonia.	6.3	12.0	-	-	-	-
28	Vanuatu, Tafea offshore, 161 km (100 mi) ENE of Tadine, New Caledonia.	6.5	10.0	-	-	-	-
28	Japan, Volcano Islands region.	7.5	260.0	V	-	-	-
29	Indonesia, Aceh offshore, 106 km (66 mi) WNW of Sinabang.	6.0	35.0	V	-	-	-
30	Federated States of Micronesia, Yap offshore, 331 km (206 mi) SSW of Inarajan Village, Guam.	6.9	14.0	IV	-	-	-
30	New Zealand, Auckland Islands region.	7.4	10.0	III	-	-	-
30	New Zealand, Auckland Islands region.	6.6	18.0	IV	-	-	-

=== October ===
October
- Strongest: 7.2 M_{w} Northern Mariana Islands

Number by magnitude
- 8.0–8.9: 0
- 7.0–7.9: 1
- 6.0–6.9: 3

Date	Country and location	M_{w}	Depth (km)	MMI	Notes	Casualties	
Date	Country and location	M_{w}	Depth (km)	MMI	Notes	Dead	Injured
2	United States, Alaska offshore, 72 km (45 mi) SSE of King Cove.	6.3	32.0	VI	-	-	-
4	Indonesia, Aceh offshore, 386 km (240 mi) W of Sinabang.	6.2	35.0	IV	-	-	-
5	South of the Fiji Islands.	6.5	509.4	-	-	-	-
6	Northern Mariana Islands, Northern Islands offshore, 419 km (260 mi) NNE of Saipan.	6.1	20.0	-	-	-	-
9	Papua New Guinea, New Ireland, 86 km (53 mi) SE of Kokopo.	6.0	39.0	VI			
13	New Caledonia, Loyalty Islands offshore, 140 km (87 mi) ENE of Tadine.	6.1	37.0	-	-	-	-
15	New Zealand, Southland, 72 km (45 mi) NNW of Te Anau.	6.8	18.0	VII	Slight damage in Fiordland.	-	-
15	New Zealand, Southland, 72 km (45 mi) NNW of Te Anau.	6.1	19.0	IV	Aftershock of the previous earthquake.	-	-
16	South of the Fiji Islands.	6.6	509.3	II	-	-	-
21	Papua New Guinea, Bougainville offshore, 79 km (49 mi) W of Panguna.	6.0	46.3	V	-	-	-
24	Indonesia, Bengkulu offshore, 138 km (86 mi) W of Bengkulu	6.8	21.0	V	-	-	-
25	Russia, Sakhalin offshore, 536 km (333 mi) SSW of Severo-Kurilsk.	6.1	20.0	II	-	-	-
31	United States, California, 6 km (3.7 mi) NNE of East Foothills.	5.6	9.7	VI	Further Information: 2007 Alum Rock earthquake	-	-
31	Northern Mariana Islands, Northern Islands offshore, 412 km (256 mi) NNE of Saipan.	7.2	207.0	IV	-	-	-
31	United States, Alaska offshore, 131 km (81 mi) WSW of Adak.	6.0	28.0	-	-	-	

=== November ===
November
- Strongest: 7.7 M_{w} Chile
- Deadliest: 7.4 M_{w} (Martinique) Martinique; 6 deaths
- Total fatalities: 14

Number by magnitude
- 8.0–8.9: 0
- 7.0–7.9: 2
- 6.0–6.9: 4

Date	Country and location	M_{w}	Depth (km)	MMI	Notes	Casualties	
Date	Country and location	M_{w}	Depth (km)	MMI	Notes	Dead	Injured
2	Pacific-Antartic Ridge.	6.1	10.0	-	-	-	-
6	India, Gujarat, 17 km (11 mi) S of Visavadar.	5.1	10.0	VI	One person died, five were injured and several buildings were damaged or collapsed in Talala.	1	5
7	Philippines, Central Visayas offshore, 8 km (5.0 mi) ESE of Bacong.	5.3	71.6	IV	One person died in Mabini.	1	-
7	Bangladesh, Chittagong, 18 km (11 mi) ESE of Bandarban.	5.5	28.7	VI	One person was killed in neighboring Myanmar. Ten people were injured and minor damage was caused.	1	10
10	(Australia) North of Macquarie Island.	6.6	10.0	-	-	-	-
14	Chile, Antofagasta, 36 km (22 mi) ESE of Tocopilla.	7.7	40.0	VIII	Further Information: 2007 Tocopilla Earthquake	2	45 - 95
15	Chile, Antofagasta offshore, 86 km (53 mi) ESE of Antofagasta.	6.3	27.0	VI	Aftershocks of the 2007 Tocopilla Earthquake.	-	-
15	Chile, Antofagasta, 82 km (51 mi) ESE of Antofagasta.	6.8	26.0	VII	Aftershocks of the 2007 Tocopilla Earthquake.	-	-
16	Ecuador, Morona-Santiago, 30 km (19 mi) E of Macas.	6.8	122.9	VI	Slight damage was caused in Guayaquil.	-	-
18	Argentina, Jujuy, 65 km (40 mi) W of Abra Pampa.	6.0	246.4	-	-	-	-
19	Fiji region.	6.3	558.3	-	-	-	-
19	Vanuatu region.	6.0	10.0	-	-	-	-
20	Iran, Khuzhestan, 54 km (34 mi) NE of Ramhormoz.	4.8	7.0	V	Thirty people were injured and slight damage was caused.	-	13
20	Papua New Guinea, Bougainville offshore, 68 km (42 mi) SSE of Panguna.	6.0	52.6	V	-	-	-
20	Chile, Antofagasta offshore, 81 km (50 mi) N of Antofagasta.	6.1	15.0	VI	Aftershock of the 2007 Tocopilla Earthquake.	-	-
22	Papua New Guinea, Morobe offshore, 107 km (66 mi) N of Lae.	6.8	53.0	VI	A water tower was damaged and power was knocked out in Lae.	-	-
25	Indonesia, West Nussa Tenggara offshore, 28 km (17 mi) NNW of Dompu.	6.5	20.0	VII	3 people were killed and hundreds were injured.	3	200+
25	Indonesia, West Suamatra offshore, 110 km (68 mi) W of Sungai Penuh.	6.0	35.0	IV	-	-	-
25	Indonesia, West Nussa Tenggara offshore, 34 km (21 mi) N of Dompu.	6.5	18.0	VII	-	-	-
27	Solomon Islands, Makira-Ulawa offshore, 60 km (37 mi) SSE of Kirakira,	6.6	16.0	VI	-	-	-
29	West Chile Rise.	6.3	10.0	-	-	-	-
29	Martinique, Le Prêcheur offshore, 18 km (11 mi) WNW of Basse-Pointe.	7.4	156.0	VII	Further Information: 2007 Martinique Earthquake	1	100+

=== December ===
December
- Strongest: 7.8 M_{w} New Zealand
- Deadliest: 6.6 M_{w} (New Zealand) New Zealand; 1 death 4.9 M_{w} (Brazil) Brazil; 1 death
- Total fatalities: 2

Number by magnitude
- 8.0–8.9: 0
- 7.0–7.9: 2
- 6.0–6.9: 2

Date	Country and location	M_{w}	Depth (km)	MMI	Notes	Casualties	
Date	Country and location	M_{w}	Depth (km)	MMI	Notes	Dead	Injured
9	Brazil, Minas Gerais, 16 km (9.9 mi) WNW of Itacarambi.	4.9	10.0	VI	One person killed and other six injured. 76 buildings were damaged.	1	6
12	South of the Fiji Islands.	7.8	152.5	VII	-	-	-
13	Chile, Antofagasta, 55 km (34 mi) N of Antofagasta.	6.0	15.0	VII	Aftershocks of the 2007 Tocopilla Earthquake.	-	-
13	Chile, Antofagasta, 52 km (32 mi) NNW of Antofagasta.	6.2	16.0	VII	Aftershocks of the 2007 Tocopilla Earthquake.	-	-
13	Samoa, Tuamasaga offshore, 147 km (91 mi) SSW of Lotofaga.	6.2	17.0	IV	-	-	-
15	Chile, Valparaíso offshore, 38 km (24 mi) N of Valparaíso.	5.9	25.0	VI	Four people injured in Viña del Mar. Some buildings damaged in Concón and Valparaíso.	-	4
15	Indonesia, Maluku, 121 km (75 mi) NNE of Lospalos, Timor Leste.	6.0	175.9	IV	-	-	-
15	Indonesia, Maluku offshore, 214 km (133 mi) WSW of Tual.	6.4	57.0 km	V	-	-	-
16	Chile, Antofagasta, 80 km (50 mi) NNE of Antofagasta.	6.7	45.0	VII	Power and communications were disrupted throughout the epicentral area from Antofagasta to Iquique.	-	-
19	United States, Alaska offshore, 207 km (129 mi) WSW of Adak.	7.2	34.0	II	-	-	-
20	New Zealand, Gisborne, 46 km (29 mi) SSE of Gisborne.	6.6	20.0	VII	Further infortmation: 2007 Gisborne earthquake	1	11
20	Turkey, Ankara, 24 km (15 mi) SW of Karakeçili.	5.7	10.0	VII	A minaret and other buildings collapsed at Yeniyapan and a mosque and animal shelters were damaged at Abazlar. Mud brick houses and masonry structures were damaged at Sırapınar. Shelters collapsed at Suyugüzel and killed about 100 animals. Slight damage occurred in Ankara.		
21	United States, Alaska offshore, 171 km (106 mi) WSW of Adak.	6.3	25.0	-	-	-	-
22	Indonesia, Papua, 175 km (109 mi) W of Abepura.	6.2	20.0	VII	-	-	-
22	Indonesia, Aceh offshore, 64 km (40 mi) E of Sinabang.	6.1	23.0	VI	-	-	-
25	Japan, Miyagi offshore, 64 km (40 mi) E of Ishinomaki.	6.1	48.4	IV	-	-	-
26	United States, Alaska offshore, 60 km (37 mi) SE of Nikolski.	6.4	25.0	-	-	-	-
26	Turkey, Ankara, 24 km (15 mi) SW of Karakeçili.	5.6	8.3	VII	2,214 buildings were damaged in Ankara.	-	-

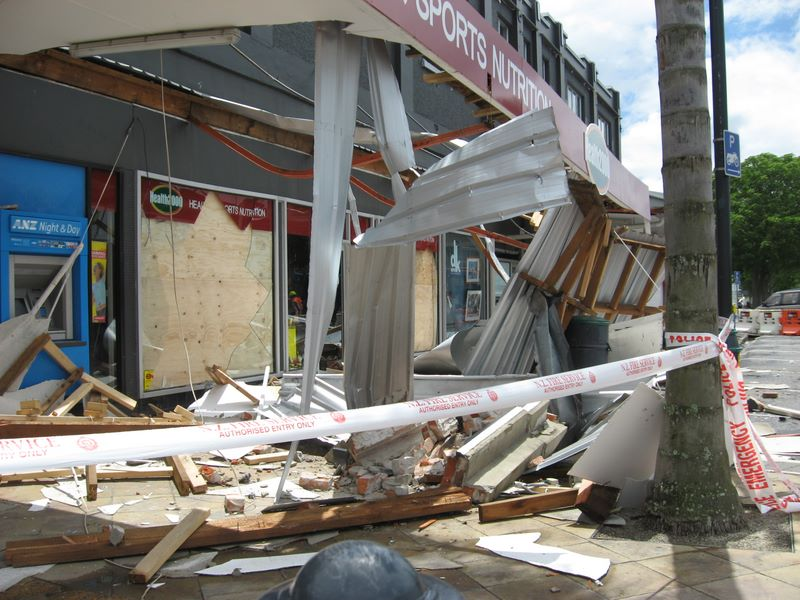
Damage in New Zealand from the earthquake.

== See also ==
- List of 21st-century earthquakes
