= Gornozavodsk =

Gornozavodsk (Russian: Горнозаво́дск) is the name of several inhabited localities in Russia.

Urban localities

- Gornozavodsk, Perm Krai, a town in Gornozavodsky District of Perm Krai

Rural localities

- Gornozavodsk, Sakhalin Oblast, a selo in Nevelsky District of Sakhalin Oblast; until 2004—a town
