= 2007 Chile earthquake =

2007 Chile earthquake may refer to:

- 2007 Tocopilla earthquake, a 7.7-magnitude earthquake occurred in November 2007
- 2007 Aysen Fjord earthquake, a 6.2-magnitude earthquake occurred in January 2007

== See also ==
- List of earthquakes in Chile
