= 2007 Nevelsk earthquake =

Earthquake and tsunami near Kholmsk, Russia

- Location within Far Eastern Federal District
- UTC time: 2007-08-02 02:37:42
- ISC event: 13199707
- USGS-ANSS: ComCat
- Local date: 2 August 2007
- Local time: 13:37 MAGT
- Magnitude: M_{w} 6.2
- Depth: 10 km (6.2 mi)
- Epicenter: 46.869°N 142.016°E
- Max. intensity: MSK-64 VIII (Damaging)
- Tsunami: 3.2 m (10 ft)
- Casualties: 4 dead, 12 injured, 8,000 homeless

The 2007 Nevelsk earthquake affected the island of Sakhalin in Russia and generated a tsunami along its coast. The M_{w} 6.2 shock occurred at a depth of 10 km (6.2 mi), and had an epicenter located 20 km (12 mi) off the coast of Kholmsk at 13:37 local time (MAGT) on 2 August. It was caused by reverse faulting on a north–south striking and west dipping fault. More than 1,800 aftershocks were recorded by the end of the year. At least four people died and at least 12 were injured. It rendered 250 buildings uninhabitable due to their severity of damage and left 8,000 people homeless. Three tsunami waves struck the island's coast with a maximum height of 3.2 m (10 ft), and small waves were observed in Hokkaido, Japan; no damage occurred.

== Tectonic setting ==
Sakhalin is situated at the boundary of the Eurasian and North American plates where oblique convergence occur. In the southern part of the island, the estimated convergence rate is 7.5 mm (0.30 in) per year. Three major fault systems run through the island; the Rebun–Moneron, Western and Central Sakhalin systems. The West Sakhalin Fault System is seismically active with earthquakes recorded in 1907 (M_{uk} 6.5), 1924 (M_{uk} 6.9) and 2000 (M_{w} 6.8) around central Sakhalin. However, its southern part has not experienced seismicity exceeding magnitude 5.0 prior to 17 August 2006 when a M_{w} 5.6 earthquake struck Gornozavodsk.

== Earthquake ==
Strong ground motion map

The M_{w} 6.2 earthquake occurred within the West Sakhalin Fault System on August 2 at 13:37 local time. It was the largest recorded earthquake in the island's southern area since a M_{s} 7.5 earthquake in 1971. The mainshock and its aftershocks were caused by predominantly reverse faulting with a minor component of strike-slip. Rupture during the mainshock occurred across a 35 km (22 mi) by 15 km (9.3 mi) area along an approximately north–south trending fault, producing displacements of up to 3 m (9.8 ft). The faults activated during the sequence dipped to the west at 38–40 degrees.

=== Aftershocks ===
The largest aftershock, measuring 6.0 on the Russian surface-wave magnitude scale (M_{LH}) occurred at 16:22. That same day, two additional aftershocks exceeded M_{LH} 5.0. By the end of 2007, at least 1,809 aftershocks were recorded, including 1,350 which occurred within eight days of the mainshock. The mainshock illuminated an area trending north-northwest–south-southeast with aftershocks. This area was 25 km (16 mi) along its strike and 12 km (7.5 mi) across. It was located north of another north–south trending aftershock zone that formed after the largest aftershock, spanning 15 km (9.3 mi). An aftershock on 5 August injured two people and destroyed additional buildings.

=== Impact ===
A maximum intensity of VII–VIII on the Medvedev–Sponheuer–Karnik scale was assigned in Nevelsk, where damage to buildings was severe. The earthquake was assigned VI–VII in Gornozavodsk and V–VI in Kholmsk. In Nevelsk, the House of Culture and several school facilities were damaged. The shock knocked out power and water services in the town. A partial collapse of the cultural house killed its director; another person died from a heart attack, and two others died while hospitalised. Twelve people were injured including two who were airlifted to Yuzhno-Sakhalinsk for treatment; another 8,000 people were left homeless. Medical experts from the Sakhalin Disaster Medicine Center also flew into the town to treat the injured. Many homes were cracked, sustained roof damage and their stairwells collapsed. In Gornozavodsk, a boarding school and water services building were damaged, and students were moved into tents. By 3 September, 250 buildings were scheduled to be torn down due to the severity of damage and some buildings collapsed. Sakhalin Governor Alexander Khoroshavin estimated the damage at over ₽11 billion (US$450 million). The demolition work initiated on 6 August.

== Tsunami ==
The earthquake generated three non-destructive tsunami waves along the coast of Sakhalin that were unusually large for its magnitude. Seven minutes after the mainshock, a tide gauge at the Kholmsk harbor recorded the sea level rising and a 0.2 m (7.9 in) wave. In the town, the sea level rose by more than 0.5 m (1 ft 8 in), causing boats to rise and fall gently. The tsunami attained a maximum height of 3.2 m (10 ft) at the mouth of the Asanai River, near the village of Zavety Il’icha in the northern part of Nevelsky District. Prior to these observations, a strong ebb tide occurred at the coast. At the Yasnomorka River mouth, the tsunami was 1.8 m (5 ft 11 in). The large tsunami observation around Nevelsk may have been due to seafloor uplift with measured uplift of 0.5–1.5 m (1 ft 8 in – 4 ft 11 in) along 10 km (6.2 mi) of the shoreline. A 0.2 m (7.9 in) wave was recorded in Rumoi, Hokkaido, Japan 86 minutes after the earthquake, and 30 minutes after that observation, a 0.3 m (1 ft 0 in) wave struck Wakkanai. The Japan Meteorological Agency issued a tsunami warning for three hours following the shock.

== Response ==
Ten hours after the earthquake, all of Nevelsk's 25,000 residents were evacuated to tent cities or evacuation centers. Over 60 rescuers arrived in Nevelsk to raise shelters for residents whose homes were damaged. Two schools also served as refuge centers. A state of emergency was declared in Sakhalin by its administrative department. Under president Vladimir Putin's order, emergency situations minister Sergei Shoigu visited the affected area to assist the homeless. At least 834 emergency personnel and 53 equipment were involved in the emergency effort. According to the town's mayor, Vladimir Pak, the federal and regional governments oversaw the rebuilding process. Vladimir Yakovlev, the regional development minister, estimated the cost of reconstruction work at ₽4.5–5 billion (US$184–204 million).

== See also ==
- List of earthquakes in 2007
- List of earthquakes in Russia
