= Quillagua =

Oasis in Chile

Coordinates: 21°39′36″S 69°32′06″W

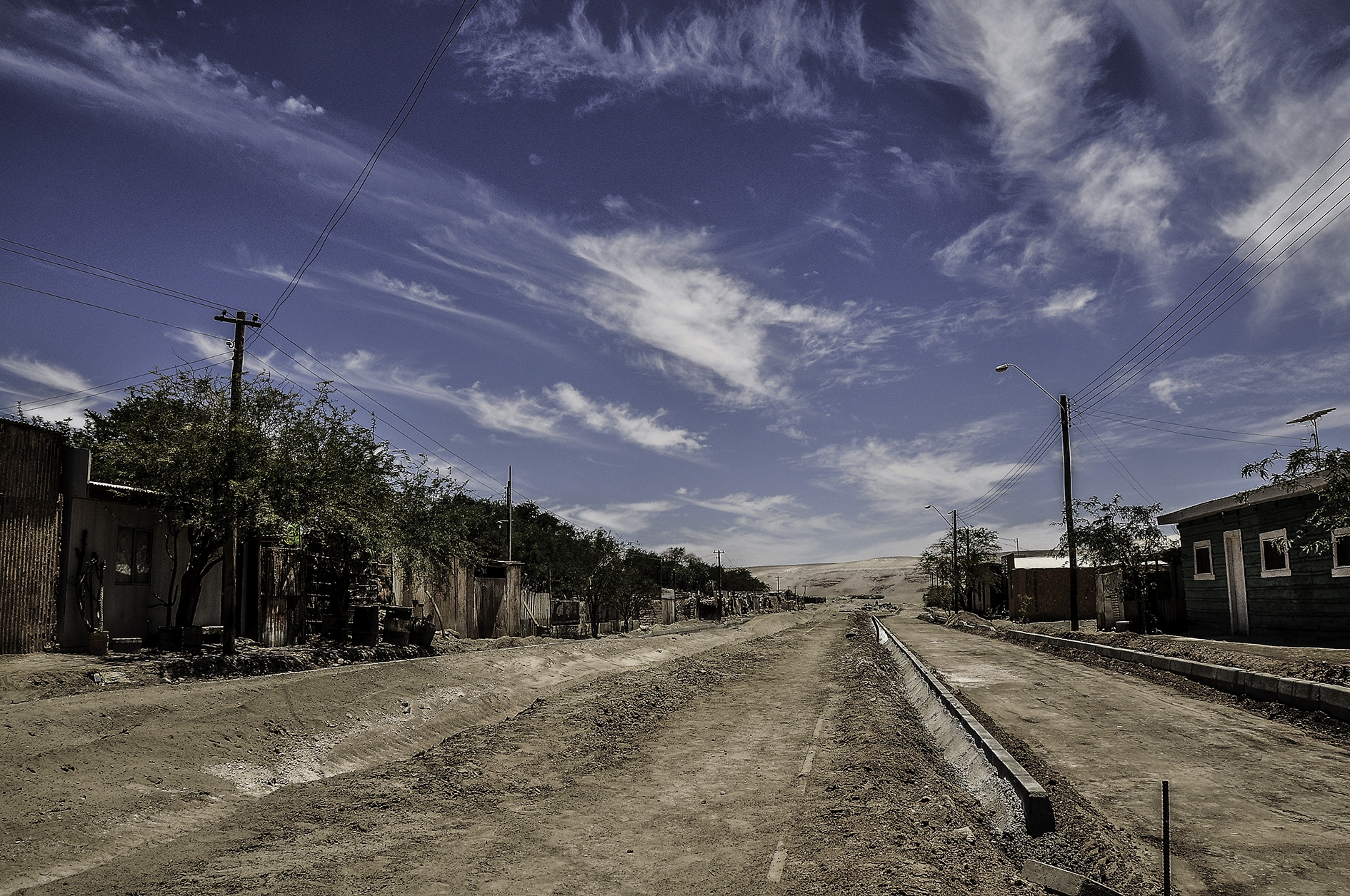

Quillagua is an oasis at about 800 m (2,600 ft) altitude in the Tocopilla Province, in the Antofagasta Region of northern Chile. It is a part of the commune of María Elena. The Loa River is crossed by the Pan-American Highway in this area. According to the Dirección Meteorológica de Chile, Quillagua is drier than Arica and thus it is the driest place on Earth. This is also recognized by Guinness World Records.

Climate data for Quillagua (1971-2000)
Month	Jan	Feb	Mar	Apr	May	Jun	Jul	Aug	Sep	Oct	Nov	Dec	Year
Mean daily maximum °C (°F)	26.9 (80.4)	26.7 (80.1)	25.3 (77.5)	23.4 (74.1)	21.1 (70.0)	19.1 (66.4)	18.8 (65.8)	19.3 (66.7)	21.4 (70.5)	22.5 (72.5)	24.0 (75.2)	26.0 (78.8)	22.9 (73.2)
Daily mean °C (°F)	21.9 (71.4)	21.7 (71.1)	20.3 (68.5)	18.4 (65.1)	16.2 (61.2)	14.3 (57.7)	14.0 (57.2)	14.5 (58.1)	16.5 (61.7)	17.6 (63.7)	19.0 (66.2)	20.5 (68.9)	17.9 (64.2)
Mean daily minimum °C (°F)	16.9 (62.4)	16.8 (62.2)	15.4 (59.7)	13.4 (56.1)	11.3 (52.3)	9.5 (49.1)	9.3 (48.7)	9.8 (49.6)	11.6 (52.9)	12.7 (54.9)	14.0 (57.2)	15.0 (59.0)	13.0 (55.3)
Average rainfall mm (inches)	0.05 (0.00)	0.0 (0.0)	0.0 (0.0)	0.0 (0.0)	0.0 (0.0)	0.0 (0.0)	0.0 (0.0)	0.0 (0.0)	0.0 (0.0)	0.0 (0.0)	0.0 (0.0)	0.0 (0.0)	0.05 (0)
Average relative humidity (%)	42	47	46	41	31	24	25	26	29	32	34	38	35
Source 1: Quillagua climate information
Source 2: Rainfall data

== See also ==
- 2007 Tocopilla earthquake
- Atacama
