= 2007 Martinique earthquake =

Earthquake in Martinique, France

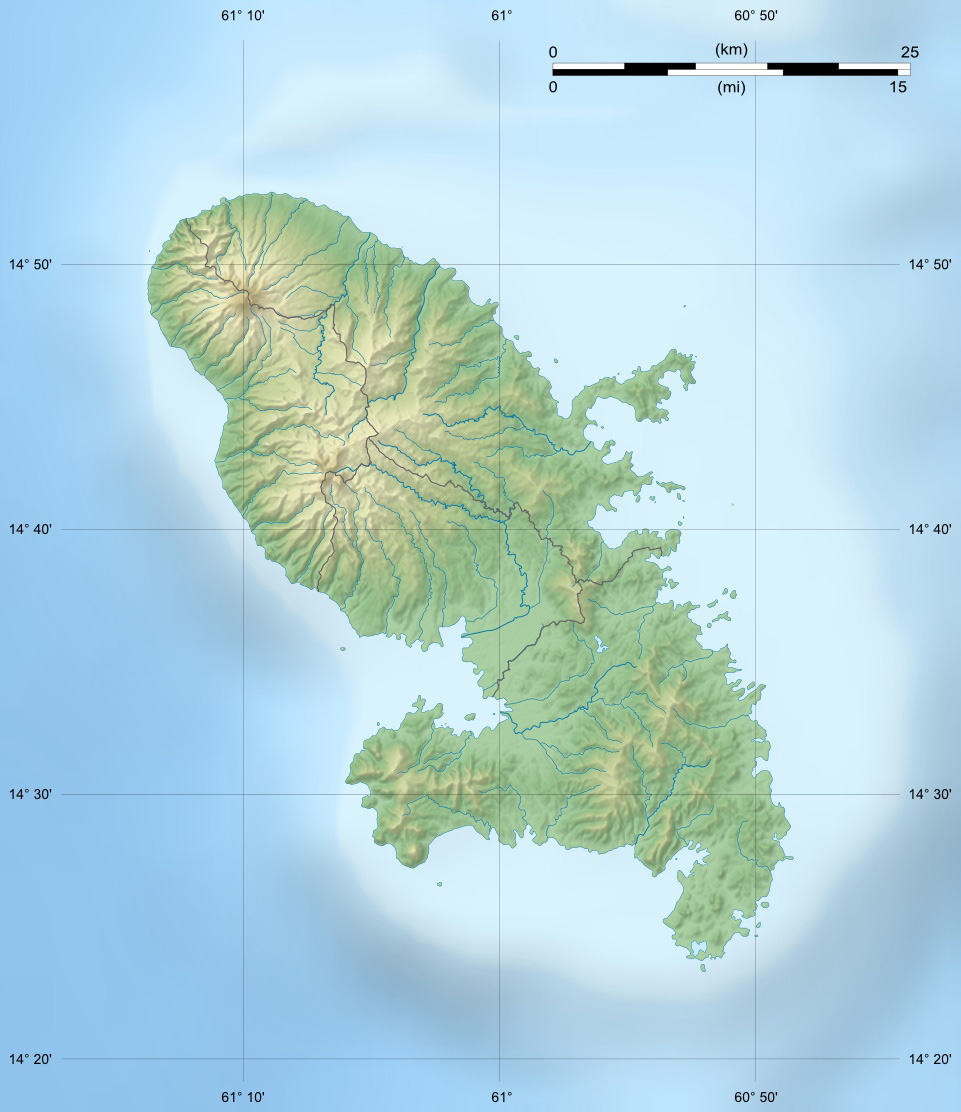
- Location within Martinique Location within Lesser Antilles
- UTC time: 2007-11-29 19:00:19
- ISC event: 13276920
- USGS-ANSS: ComCat
- Local date: November 29, 2007
- Local time: 15:00:19 (local time)
- Magnitude: 7.4 M_{w}
- Depth: 150 km (93 mi)
- Epicenter: 14.98°N 61.26°W
- Areas affected: Martinique, France
- Max. intensity: MMI VII (Very strong)
- Casualties: 1 dead 100+ injured

The 2007 Martinique earthquake took place on November 29, 2007, at 15:00:19 local time in the Windward Islands region, underneath the Martinique Passage. It was a magnitude 7.4 earthquake that occurred 18 km (11 mi) west northwest from Basse-Pointe, Martinique.

This earthquake was felt strongly in Martinique, Dominica, St. Lucia, Guadeloupe, Montserrat, Antigua, St Kitts and Nevis, Anguilla, British Virgin Islands, U.S. Virgin Islands, and Puerto Rico. Power outages were reported in Martinique, Dominica and Guadeloupe. It was also felt in other Eastern Caribbean islands, from Puerto Rico to the north to Trinidad and Tobago to the south. It could also be felt in part of South America such as in Venezuela, Guyana, Suriname, and French Guiana. In Caracas, Venezuela, some people evacuated office buildings. The intensity reached VI to VII on the EMS98 scale in Martinique and Dominica.

In the surrounding region, the South American plate is subducting beneath the Caribbean plate. This earthquake occurred within the South America Plate and was in response to stresses generated by the slow distortion of the plate.

== See also ==
- List of earthquakes in 2007
- List of earthquakes in France
- List of earthquakes in the Caribbean
