= María Elena, Chile =

María Elena
- Town and Commune
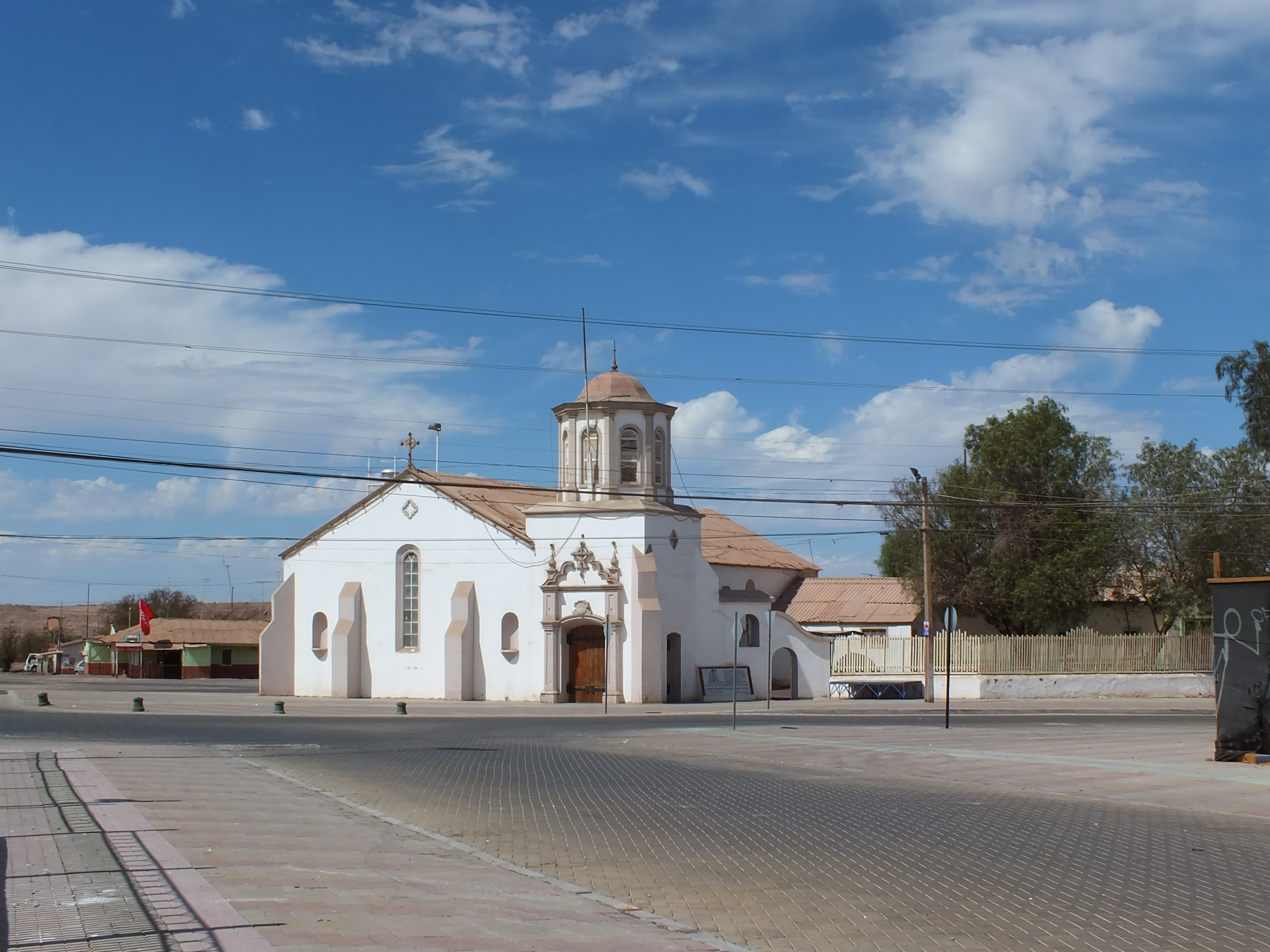

- Coat of arms Map of María Elena in Antofagasta Region Location in Chile
- Coordinates: 22°20′42.40″S 69°39′41.51″W
- Country: Chile
- Region: Antofagasta
- Province: Tocopilla
- Settled: approx. 1920

Government
  - Type: Municipality
  - Alcalde: Jorge Godoy Bolvarán (PS)

Area
  - Total: 12,197.2 km^{2} (4,709.4 sq mi)
- Elevation: 1,155 m (3,789 ft)

Population (2012)
  - Total: 7,530
  - Density: 0.617/km^{2} (1.60/sq mi)
  - Urban: 7,412
  - Rural: 118

Sex
  - Male: 4,298
  - Female: 3,232
- Time zone: UTC−4 (CLT)
  - Summer (DST): UTC−3 (CLST)
- Area code: 56 + 55
- Website: Municipality of María Elena

María Elena is a Chilean town and commune in Tocopilla Province, Antofagasta Region. According to the 2012 census, the commune population was 4,593 and has an area of 12,197.2 km^{2} (4,709 sq mi).

== History ==
Maria Elena is named after Mary Ellen Comdon, the wife of the first saltpeter refinery works (oficina salitre) manager, Elias Cappelen. Originally, the name of the works was "Coya Norte". Situated on land purchased from the Treasury in 1924, the plant was opened in 1926 using a sodium nitrate extraction system patented by the Guggenheim Brothers which had replaced the Shanks system. It was laid out on the basis of the flag of the United Kingdom. Together with the former refinery at Pedro de Valdivia built in 1931, it was the largest saltpeter works with a combined output of over one million tons per year.

In 1965 both were taken over by the state, through the Chemicals and Mining Company (SQM), which was privatized in 1980. This privatization explains why most land and buildings are owned by SQM and not by individuals or the Chilean state.

In 1996, it became the only active mining community in the country after the closure of the saltpeter works at Pedro de Valdivia, following which many workers and their families were relocated to Maria Elena.

On November 14, 2007, the area was devastated by a 7.7 M_{w} earthquake with an epicenter 80 km (50 mi) north of Maria Elena. Almost all the town's old houses collapsed or were made uninhabitable, and the local hospital also almost completely collapsed, though with no loss of life or injuries.

== Demographics ==
According to the 1992 census of the National Statistics Institute María Elena had 7,530 inhabitants; of these, 7,412 (98.4%) lived in urban areas and 118 (1.6%) in rural areas. At that time, there were 4,298 men and 3,232 women. By 2002, the population had fallen 44.9% (124,130 persons) since the 1992 census of 13,660.

The commune of María Elena is composed of six census districts.

| Census district | | | 1992 Census | | | 2002 Census | | |
|---|---|---|---|---|---|---|---|---|
| # | District | Area (km^{2}) | Total | Urban | Rural | Total | Urban | Rural |
| 1 | Quillagua | 4,014.7 | 103 | 0 | 103 | 127 | 0 | 127 |
| 2 | Rica Aventura | 1,480.0 | 0 | 0 | 0 | 0 | 0 | 0 |
| 3 | Toco | 1,937.5 | 11 | 0 | 11 | 4 | 0 | 4 |
| 4 | María Elena | 1,475.0 | 7,413 | 7,412 | 1 | 2,556 | 2,553 | 3 |
| 5 | Francisco Vergara | 805.0 | 1 | 0 | 1 | 1 | 0 | 1 |
| 6 | Pedro de Valdivia | 2,485.0 | 2 | 0 | 2 | 1 | 0 | 1 |
| | Total | 12,197.2 | 7,530 | 7,412 | 118 | 2,689 | 2,553 | 136 |

Source: INE 2007 report, "Territorial division of Chile"

== Administration ==
As a commune, María Elena is a third-level administrative division of Chile administered by a municipal council, headed by an alcalde who is directly elected every four years. The 2008-2012 alcalde is Jorge Godoy Bolvarán (PS), and the council has the following members:

- Carlos Hidalgo Marfull
- Nelson Avendaño Véliz
- Jaqueline Godoy Soto
- Jorge Ramirez Plaza
- Carlos Ardiles Aceituno
- Andrés Concha F.

Within the electoral divisions of Chile, María Elena is represented in the Chamber of Deputies by Marcos Espinosa (PRSD) and Felipe Ward (UDI) as part of the 3rd electoral district, (together with Tocopilla, Calama, Ollagüe and San Pedro de Atacama). The commune is represented in the Senate by Carlos Cantero Ojeda (Ind.) and José Antonio Gómez (PRSD) as part of the 2nd senatorial constituency (Antofagasta Region).

== See also ==
- List of Saltpeter works in Tarapacá and Antofagasta
