= Gornozavodsk, Sakhalin Oblast =

Gornozavodsk Горнозаводск
- Selo
- Interactive map of Gornozavodsk
- Location of Gornozavodsk Gornozavodsk (Sakhalin Oblast)
- Coordinates: 46°34′N 141°51′E
- Country: Russia
- Federal subject: Sakhalin Oblast
- Administrative district: Nevelsky District
- Founded: 1905
- Rural locality status since: 2004

Population (2010 Census)
  - Total: 4,389
  - Estimate (2021): 3,711 (−15.4%)
- Time zone: UTC+11 (MSK+8)
- Postal code: 694760
- Dialing code: +7 42436
- OKTMO ID: 64728000141

Gornozavodsk (Russian: Горнозаводск; (Japanese: 内幌町, Naihoro-chō) is a rural locality (a selo) in Nevelsky District of Sakhalin Oblast, Russia, located in the southwest of the Sakhalin Island. Population: 4,389 (2010 census); 6,051 (2002 census); 9,070 (1989 Soviet census).

== History ==
It was founded in 1905 when the southern part of Sakhalin belonged to Japan. At the end of World War II, the Soviet Army retook the whole of the island of Sakhalin and the Kuril Islands. The settlement was granted town status in 1947. When coal mining was ended in the 1990s, its population dwindled. As a result, Gornozavodsk was demoted to a rural locality in 2004.
