= Nevelsk =

Town in Sakhalin Oblast, Russia

Nevelsk Невельск
- Town
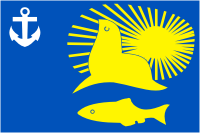
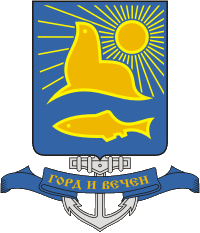
- Flag Coat of arms
- Interactive map of Nevelsk
- Location of Nevelsk Nevelsk (Sakhalin Oblast)
- Coordinates: 46°41′N 141°52′E
- Country: Russia
- Federal subject: Sakhalin Oblast
- Administrative district: Nevelsky District
- Founded: 1789
- Town status since: 1947

Government
  - Mayor: Vladimir Pak
- Elevation: 10 m (33 ft)

Population (2010 Census)
  - Total: 11,682
  - Estimate (2025): 10,457 (−10.5%)

Administrative status
  - Capital of: Nevelsky District

Municipal status
  - Urban okrug: Nevelsky Urban Okrug
  - Capital of: Nevelsky Urban Okrug
- Time zone: UTC+11 (MSK+8)
- Postal codes: 694740–694742, 694745
- Dialing code: +7 42436
- OKTMO ID: 64728000001
- Town Day: Third Sunday of September
- Website: adm-nevelsk.ru

Nevelsk (Russian: Не́вельск; Japanese: 本斗町, Honto-chō) is a port town and the administrative center of Nevelsky District of Sakhalin Oblast, Russia, located on the southwest coast of the Sakhalin Island, 123 kilometers (76 mi) from Yuzhno-Sakhalinsk, the administrative center of the oblast. Population: 11,682 (2010 census); 18,639 (2002 census); 24,236 (1989 Soviet census).

== History ==
The first Russian settlers founded a village on the present site of Nevelsk in 1789. The region was the site of a struggle for control between the Russians and Japanese. After the Treaty of Shimoda officially transferred the southern Kuril Islands to Japan in 1855, the settlement was placed under joint Russian-Japanese administration under the name Honto (derived from the Ainu language).

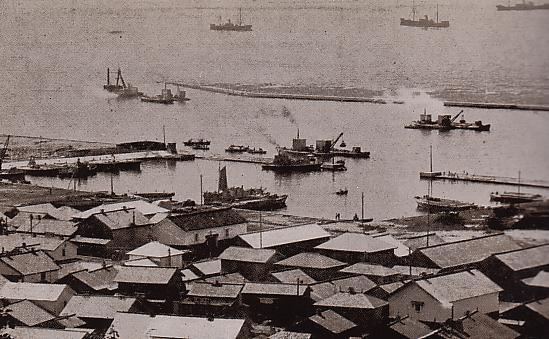
Nevelsk before 1945

Honto reverted to complete Russian administration in 1875, as the Treaty of Saint Petersburg gave control of all the Kuril Islands to Japan, in exchange for complete Russian sovereignty over the island of Sakhalin. It then returned to Japanese rule in 1905, after the Treaty of Portsmouth ceded southern Sakhalin to Japan to end the Russo-Japanese War.

Sakhalin's first ice-free harbor was constructed here between 1916 and 1927, and the settlement developed as a center for the local fishing industry.

The end of World War II saw the Soviet Army retake the full island of Sakhalin and the Kuril Islands. The settlement was granted town status in 1947 under its present name, in honor of Admiral Gennady Nevelskoy.

The town was damaged by an earthquake in 2007 (near the Tatar Strait), leaving about two thousand people homeless.

== Administrative and municipal status ==
Within the framework of administrative divisions, Nevelsk serves as the administrative center of Nevelsky District and is subordinated to it. As a municipal division, the town of Nevelsk and ten rural localities of Nevelsky District are incorporated as Nevelsky Urban Okrug.

== Economy ==
The town's economy relies largely on fishing and associated industries. Due to relatively warm ocean currents, the town is located in the mildest climatic zone on the island of Sakhalin, making possible agriculture in the surrounding region. There have been recent efforts to develop the area as a tourist area for marine animal viewing, diving and yachting.

The HSCS-Hokkaido-Sakhalin Cable System. undersea fiber optic cable runs between Ishikari (Hokkaido, Japan) and Nevelsk.

== Climate ==
Nevelsk has a humid continental climate (Köppen Dfb) with cold winters, warm summers and generally heavy precipitation from the Aleutian Low, whose winds hit the town direct from the Sea of Japan.

Climate data for Nevelsk
Month	Jan	Feb	Mar	Apr	May	Jun	Jul	Aug	Sep	Oct	Nov	Dec	Year
Record high °C (°F)	8.2 (46.8)	7.2 (45.0)	12.9 (55.2)	21.2 (70.2)	24.6 (76.3)	29.0 (84.2)	29.3 (84.7)	29.2 (84.6)	27.8 (82.0)	22.0 (71.6)	16.1 (61.0)	10.4 (50.7)	29.3 (84.7)
Mean daily maximum °C (°F)	−5.5 (22.1)	−4.8 (23.4)	−0.6 (30.9)	5.7 (42.3)	10.8 (51.4)	14.8 (58.6)	18.7 (65.7)	20.6 (69.1)	17.9 (64.2)	11.7 (53.1)	3.6 (38.5)	−2.4 (27.7)	7.5 (45.6)
Daily mean °C (°F)	−8.0 (17.6)	−7.6 (18.3)	−3.4 (25.9)	2.6 (36.7)	7.3 (45.1)	11.5 (52.7)	15.7 (60.3)	17.6 (63.7)	14.7 (58.5)	8.3 (46.9)	0.7 (33.3)	−4.9 (23.2)	4.5 (40.2)
Mean daily minimum °C (°F)	−10.5 (13.1)	−10.2 (13.6)	−6.1 (21.0)	0.0 (32.0)	4.4 (39.9)	8.7 (47.7)	13.2 (55.8)	15.1 (59.2)	11.8 (53.2)	5.3 (41.5)	−2.1 (28.2)	−7.4 (18.7)	1.8 (35.3)
Record low °C (°F)	−22.5 (−8.5)	−22.4 (−8.3)	−21.6 (−6.9)	−11.9 (10.6)	−5.1 (22.8)	−0.5 (31.1)	3.2 (37.8)	6.1 (43.0)	0.0 (32.0)	−7.1 (19.2)	−15.0 (5.0)	−19.7 (−3.5)	−22.5 (−8.5)
Average precipitation mm (inches)	68.0 (2.68)	51.8 (2.04)	38.5 (1.52)	46.2 (1.82)	57.1 (2.25)	56.5 (2.22)	95.5 (3.76)	101.6 (4.00)	97.7 (3.85)	87.0 (3.43)	78.7 (3.10)	78.3 (3.08)	856.8 (33.73)
Average precipitation days	24.6	19.9	16.4	12.1	12.4	12.3	13.2	12.8	13.4	14.2	17.1	22.8	191.2
Average rainy days	1	1	1	8	14	15	15	16	15	15	7	2	110
Average snowy days	25	22	20	10	3	0	0	0	0	3	16	25	124
Source 1: Weatherbase
Source 2: Climatebase.ru
