= Tocopilla =

- City and Commune
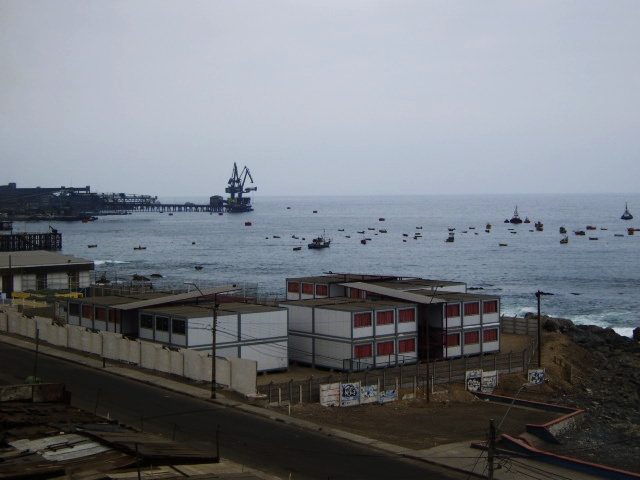
- Port of Tocopilla

- Coat of arms Map of Tocopilla commune in Antofagasta Region Location in Chile
- Coordinates: 22°05′20″S 70°11′45″W
- Country: Chile
- Region: Antofagasta
- Province: Tocopilla
- Founded: 1843

Government
  - Type: Municipal council
  - Mayor: Fernando San Román Bascuñán

Area
  - Total: 4,038.8 km^{2} (1,559.4 sq mi)
- Elevation: 154 m (505 ft)

Population (2012 Census)
  - Total: 24,247
  - Density: 6.0035/km^{2} (15.549/sq mi)
  - Urban: 23,352
  - Rural: 634
- Demonym: Tocopillian

Sex
  - Men: 12,050
  - Women: 11,936
- Time zone: UTC−4 (CLT)
  - Summer (DST): UTC−3 (CLST)
- Area code: +56 552
- Climate: BWh
- Website: Official website (in Spanish)

Tocopilla is a city and commune in the Antofagasta Region, in the north of Chile. It is the capital of the province that bears the same name.

The city is divided into two main parts consisting of the central city and smaller portion known as La Villa Sur (in which the more luxurious houses are located). The two parts are divided by the thermoelectric power plant and a large saltpeter processing and shipping plant, with the coastal highway connecting the two portions. The northern portion of Tocopilla is home of the municipal buildings, the central square and many stores and shops. The steep gradient of the city from beach to vertical hillside is covered in houses and apartments crammed together to save space. A large artificial beach called "Covadonga" and a small artificial beach called "Caleta Boy" are the main attractions during summer months and serve as a focus away from the heat of the Atacama. On the north side of the city, there is a black sandy beach called "El Panteón".

The port of Tocopilla has three individual terminals or ports which together stand for 1.0% of the annual tonnage of Chile's external trade as of 2024.

Every year Tocopilla celebrates its anniversary on 29 September with a big show the day before, which includes a parade down in the main street of the city, food and a fireworks display at midnight.

Tocopilla is the birthplace of artist Alejandro Jodorowsky and footballer Alexis Sánchez.

== Toponymy ==
Tocopilla means "the devil's corner" in the Quechua language.

Jodorowsky explains the etymology further in his autobiography The Dance of Reality: "In the Andean language of Quechua, Toco means "double sacred square" and Pilla means "devil." In this case, the devil is not the incarnation of evil but a being of the subterranean dimension who gazes through a window made of both spirit and matter—that is, the body—in order to observe the world and share his knowledge with it. Among the Mapuche, Pillán means "the soul, the human spirit arrived at its final destination."

== 2007 earthquake ==
On 14 November 2007, a magnitude 7.7 earthquake occurred 40 km (25 mi) east-southeast of Tocopilla, followed by aftershocks of magnitude up to 6.8. As a consequence, 1,200 homes were destroyed in Tocopilla, leaving 4,000 of its 27,000 inhabitants homeless. There were two fatalities, and at least 115 were injured.

== Demographics ==
According to the 2002 census of the National Statistics Institute, Tocopilla had 23,986 inhabitants (12,050 men and 11,936 women). Of these, 23,352 (97.4%) lived in urban areas and 634 (2.6%) in rural areas. The population fell by 4.0% (999 persons) between the 1992 and 2002 censuses.

== Administration ==
As a commune, Tocopilla is a third-level administrative division of Chile administered by a municipal council, headed by an alcalde who is directly elected every four years. The 2013-2016 alcalde is Fernando San Román Bascuñán (Ind./PRO).

Within the electoral divisions of Chile, Tocopilla is represented in the Chamber of Deputies by Marcos Espinosa (PRSD) and Felipe Ward (UDI) as part of the 3rd electoral district, (together with María Elena, Calama, Ollagüe and San Pedro de Atacama). The commune is represented in the Senate by Pedro Araya Guerrero (Ind.) and Alejandro Guillier (Ind.) as part of the 2nd senatorial constituency (Antofagasta Region).

== Sport ==
The city has one association football team called Deportes Tocopilla who currently play in Tercera B.

Former Arsenal F.C. and Manchester United F.C. forward Alexis was also born in Tocopilla and currently competes in MLS for CF Montréal.

== Economy ==
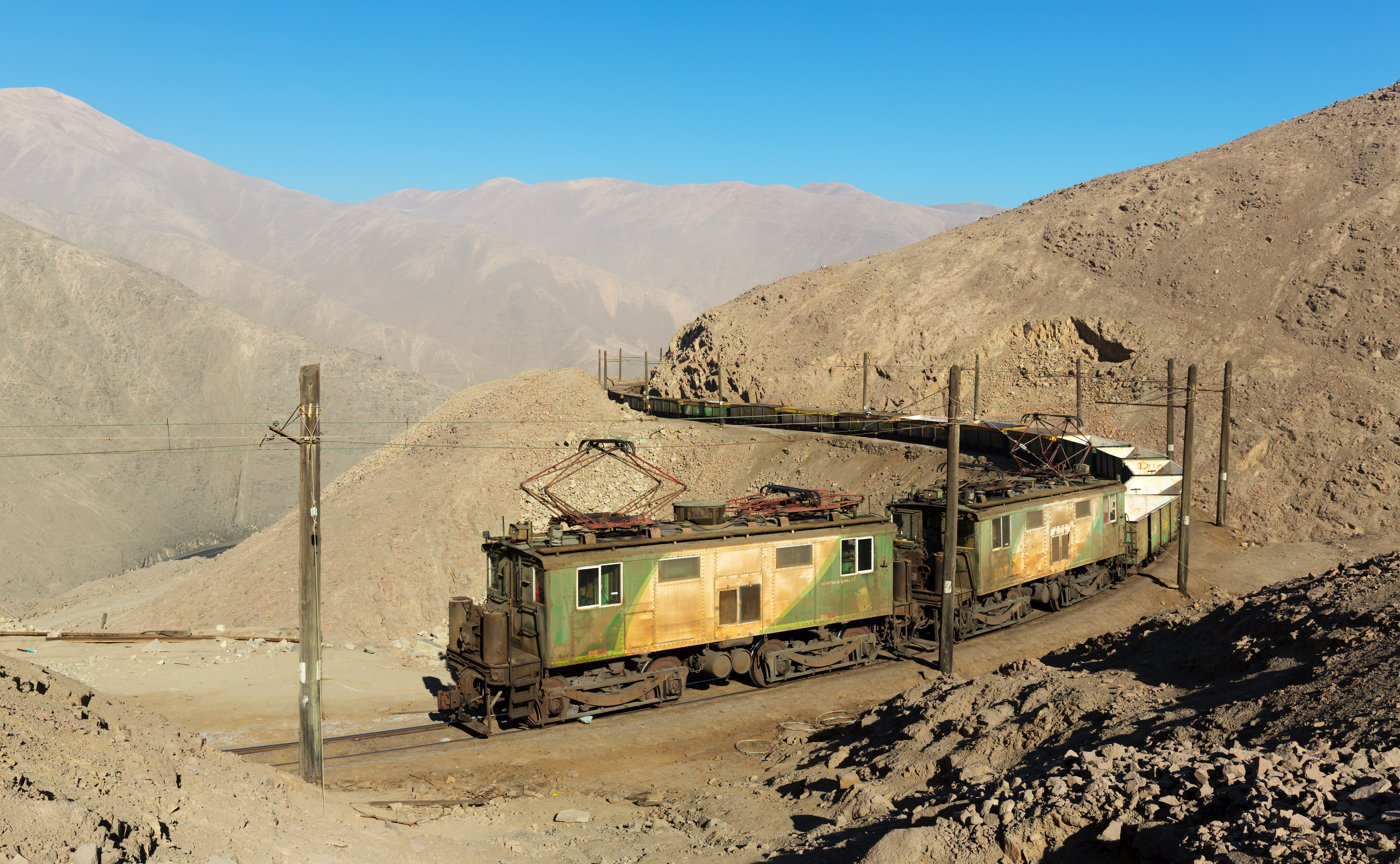
A freight train with empty nitrate hoppers, going from Tocopilla to Barriles

This city generates electricity for the entire region and is therefore known as "the city of energy". When saltpeter exportation in Chile was at its highest point, Tocopilla was especially significant as an export point. Nowadays, even when the saltpeter is not so profitable, Tocopilla is still home of companies focused on its extraction.

Its position along the coast allows it to have an active fishing activity, that along with the mining activity are the main resources. It is a fishing port, with fishmeal and canned fish factories. Through its port the copper from Chuquicamata and saltpeter from El Toco are exported. Tocopilla has metallurgic, chemical and nitrate treatment industries, along with the former 276 MW coal power plant, which closed in 2022. A 660 MWh grid battery was built at the site in 2025, and started operating in 2026.

Due to these activities, Tocopilla is a dormitory city, since many people work outside the city. Two other important sports are volleyball, with relative success at school and federated level.

== In media ==
The Dance of Reality, a 2013 Chilean-French film by Alejandro Jodorowsky, was filmed in Tocopilla.

The city is mentioned in the Hank Snow and Johnny Cash song "I've Been Everywhere."
