= Tocopilla Province =

Tocopilla Province Provincia de Tocopilla
- Province
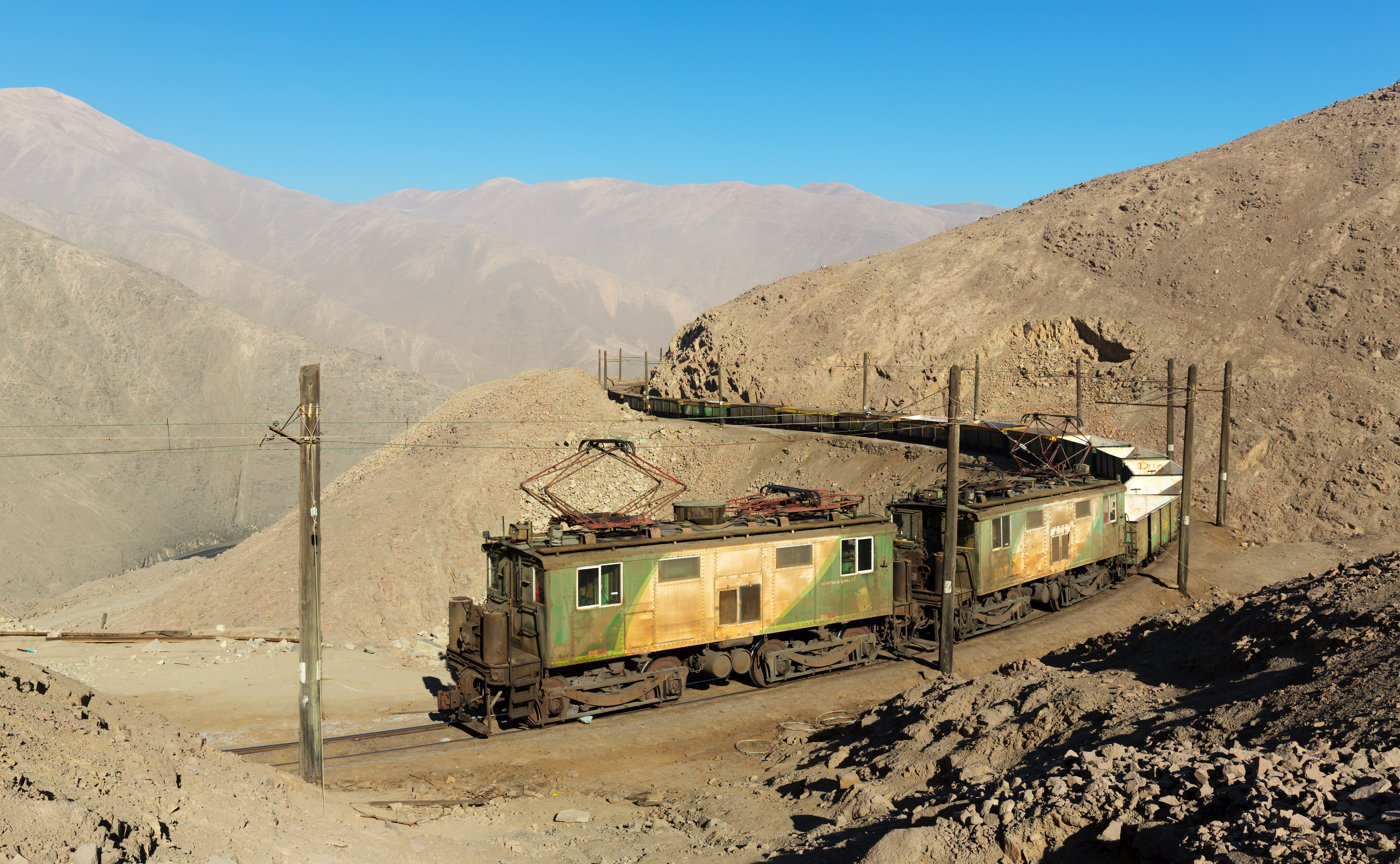
- Locomotive hauling empty nitrate hoppers from Tocopilla to Barriles

- Seal

- Location in the Antofagasta Region

- Location in Chile
- Coordinates: 21°55′S 69°48′W
- Country: Chile
- Region: Antofagasta
- Capital: Tocopilla
- Communes: Tocopilla; María Elena

Government
  - Type: Provincial
  - Presidential Provincial Delegate: Rossana Montero Morales (Ind.)

Area
  - Total: 16,236.0 km^{2} (6,268.8 sq mi)

Population (2012 Census)
  - Total: 28,840
  - Density: 1.776/km^{2} (4.601/sq mi)
  - Urban: 30,764
  - Rural: 752

Sex
  - Men: 16,348
  - Women: 15,168
- Time zone: UTC-4 (CLT)
  - Summer (DST): UTC-3 (CLST)
- Area code: 56 + 55
- Website: Delegation of Tocopilla

Tocopilla Province (Spanish: Provincia de Tocopilla) is one of the three provinces in the northern Chilean region of Antofagasta (II). Its capital is the city of Tocopilla.

== Geography and demography ==
According to the 2012 census by the National Statistics Institute (INE), the province spans an area of 16,236.0 km^{2} (6,269 sq mi) and had a population of 28,840 inhabitants, giving it a population density of 1.9/km^{2} (5/sq mi). Between the 1992 and 2002 censuses, the population fell by 18.4% (7,129 persons).

== Administration ==
As a province, Tocopilla is a second-level administrative division of Chile, which is further divided into two communes (comunas). The province is administered by a presidentially appointed provincial delegate. Rossana Montero Morales was appointed by president Gabriel Boric.

=== Communes ===
- Tocopilla (capital)
- María Elena
