= 2007 Aysén Fjord earthquakes =

Earthquake and tsunami in Chile

- Location within Aysén Location within Chile
- UTC time: 2007-04-21 17:53:44
- ISC event: 11931187
- USGS-ANSS: ComCat
- Local date: April 21, 2007
- Local time: 1:53 p.m.
- Magnitude: 6.2 M_{w}
- Depth: 25 km (16 mi)
- Epicenter: 45.27°S 72.66°W
- Type: Strike-slip
- Areas affected: Chile
- Max. intensity: MMI VII (Very strong)
- Tsunami: 50 m (160 ft)
- Casualties: 10 dead

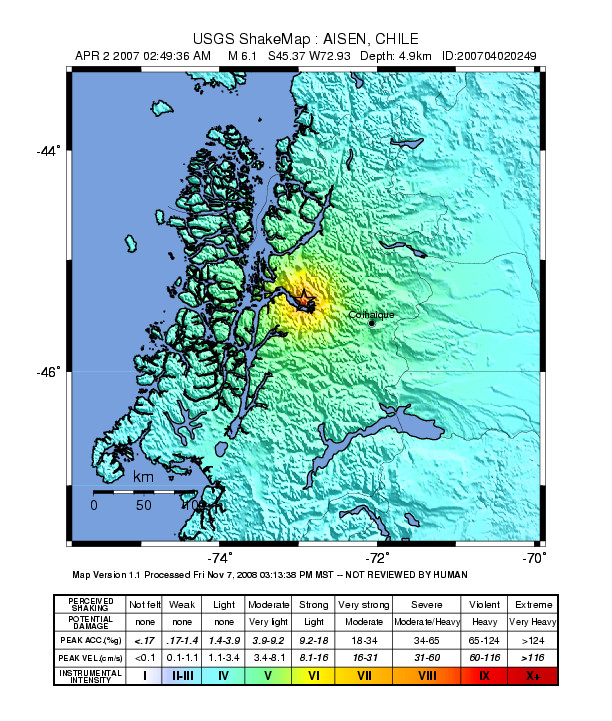
USGS ShakeMap for the mainshock

The 2007 Aysén Fjord earthquakes occurred in Aisén Fjord, Chile from January 22 – April 22. The biggest occurred at 1:53 p.m. (local time) on April 21 and reached a felt intensity of VII (Very strong) on the Mercalli intensity scale. On the moment magnitude scale, the earthquake reached a magnitude of 6.2. Ten people disappeared due to a tsunami caused by a landslide, according to ONEMI (Chile's National emergency office), but three bodies were found on April 22 by the Chilean Navy.

== Earthquakes ==
Starting January 22, Aysén Fjord suffered a series of minor earthquakes. The greatest before April 21 reached VI (Strong) on the Mercalli intensity scale and occurred at 3:44 p.m. on April 14. Local fishermen reported seeing steam rising from the fjord. The earthquake expanded to several zones of the country. At 6:22 a.m. (local time) on April 22, an intense earthquake was felt in Santiago, reaching II (Weak) on the Mercalli intensity scale.

=== Intensity ===
According to ONEMI, the following cities and town in Aysén del General Carlos Ibáñez del Campo Region were affected. The Roman numerals show the intensity on the Mercalli intensity scale.

- Puerto Chacabuco VII
- Puerto Aisén VII
- Coihaique VI
- Balmaceda V
- Cochrane IV

=== Ground effects ===
On the mountains around the fjord, the earthquake caused landslides that in turn created waves as high as fifty meters, which severely damaged some salmon aquaculture installations. The potable water systems of the cities of Puerto Chacabuco and Puerto Aisén were broken, forcing firefighters and the army to supply water. The electricity network of Puerto Chacabuco was also cut off.

== Aftermath ==
Despite protests against the government organized by Aysen's mayor, Chile's president, Michelle Bachelet, visited the affected zone. She was met with black flags, and, during the protest, Aysen's mayor Óscar Catalán was arrested. Catalán had been heavily critical that the region had not received the necessary help to prevent damage and casualties, as the swarm had been active since January.

== See also ==
- Liquiñe-Ofqui Fault
- List of earthquakes in 2007
- List of earthquakes in Chile
- Riñihuazo
