= Basse-Pointe =

- Commune
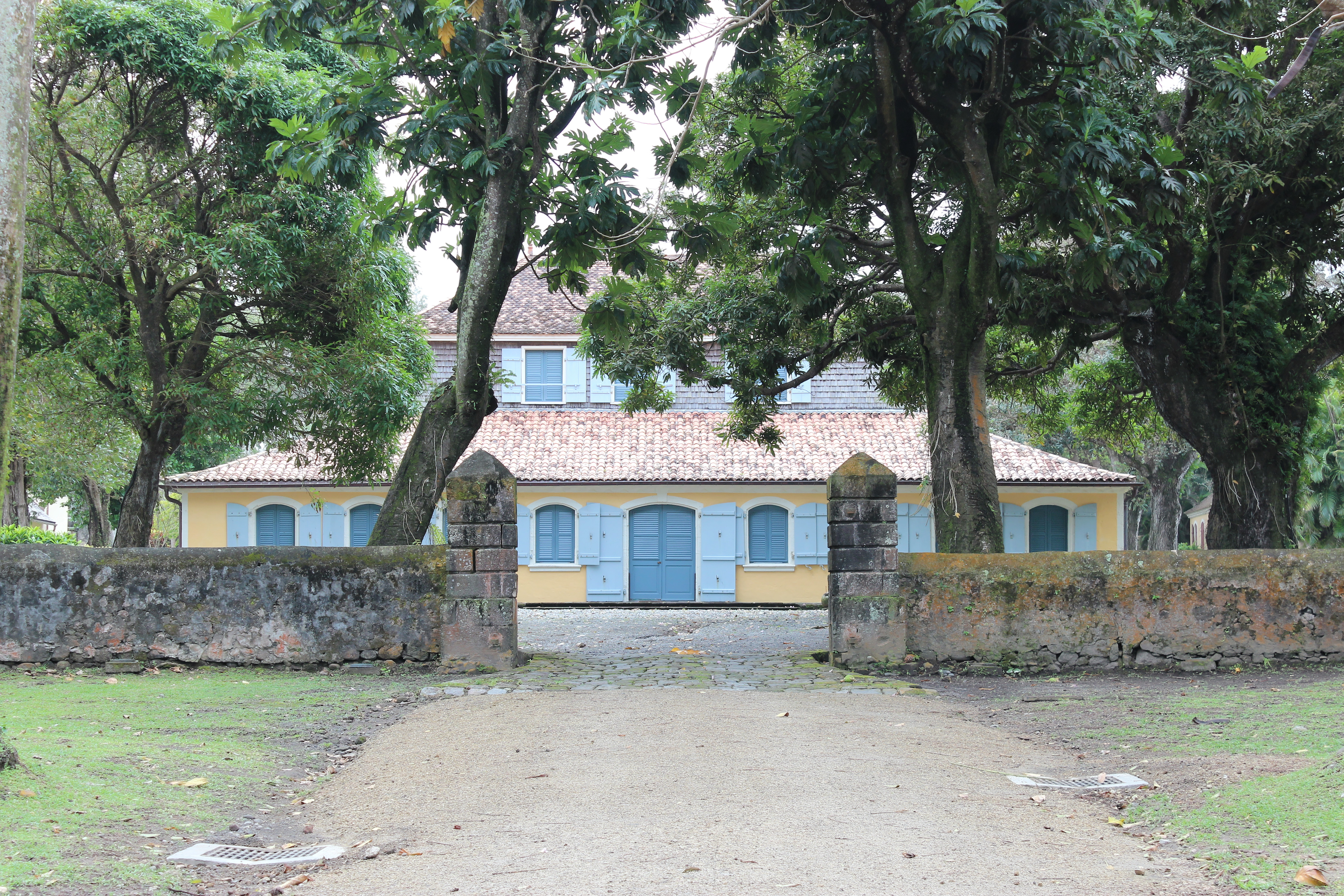
- Housing in Pécoul, classified as historical monuments

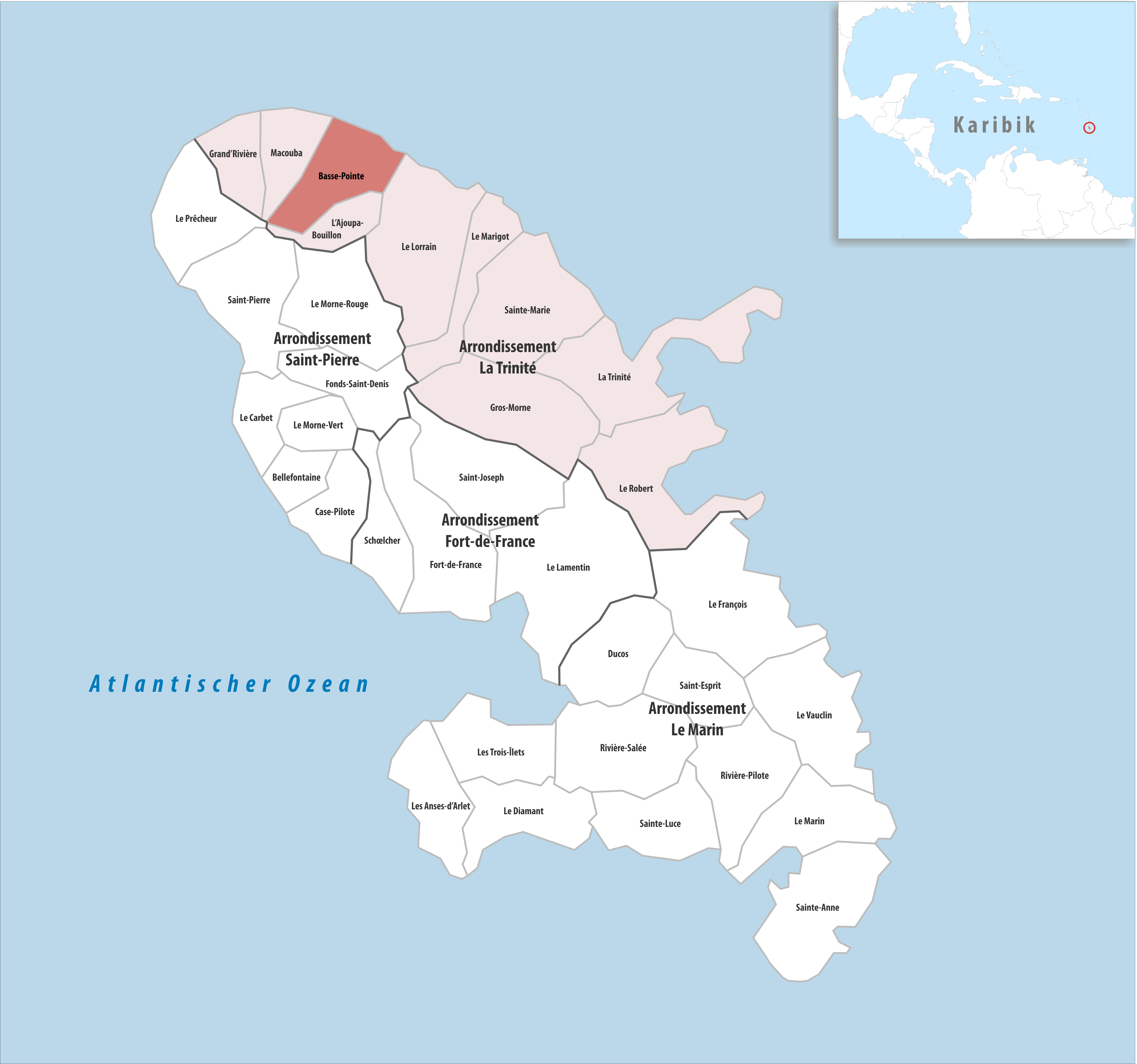
- Location of the commune (in red) within Martinique
- Location of Basse-Pointe
- Location within France
- Coordinates: 14°52′N 61°07′W
- Country: France
- Overseas region and department: Martinique
- Arrondissement: La Trinité
- Intercommunality: CA Pays Nord Martinique

Government
  - Mayor (2020–2026): Marie-Thérèse Casimirius
- Area^{1}: 27.95 km^{2} (10.79 sq mi)
- Highest elevation: 1,279 m (4,196 ft)
- Lowest elevation: 0 m (0 ft)
- Population (2023): 2,852
  - Density: 102.0/km^{2} (264.3/sq mi)
- Demonym: Pointois.e
- Time zone: UTC−04:00 (AST)
- INSEE/Postal code: 97203 /97218
- ^{1} French Land Register data, which excludes lakes, ponds, glaciers > 1 km^{2} (0.386 sq mi or 247 acres) and river estuaries.

Basse-Pointe (French pronunciation: [bɑs pwɛ̃t]; Antillean Creole: Baspwent, [baspwɛ̃t]) is a town and commune in the French overseas department and region, and island of Martinique.

== Geography ==
=== Climate ===
Basse-Pointe has a tropical rainforest climate (Köppen climate classification Af). The average annual temperature in Basse-Pointe is 26.5 °C (79.7 °F). The average annual rainfall is 2,636.0 mm (103.78 in) with November as the wettest month. The temperatures are highest on average in August, at around 27.6 °C (81.7 °F), and lowest in February, at around 25.1 °C (77.2 °F). The highest temperature ever recorded in Basse-Pointe was 36.3 °C (97.3 °F) on 1 October 2019; the coldest temperature ever recorded was 16.3 °C (61.3 °F) on 21 September 1978.

Climate data for Basse-Pointe (1991–2020 averages, extremes 1971−present)
Month	Jan	Feb	Mar	Apr	May	Jun	Jul	Aug	Sep	Oct	Nov	Dec	Year
Record high °C (°F)	32.4 (90.3)	33.2 (91.8)	33.1 (91.6)	35.2 (95.4)	34.0 (93.2)	35.2 (95.4)	34.6 (94.3)	34.1 (93.4)	35.6 (96.1)	36.3 (97.3)	33.1 (91.6)	32.4 (90.3)	36.3 (97.3)
Mean daily maximum °C (°F)	28.7 (83.7)	28.8 (83.8)	29.2 (84.6)	29.8 (85.6)	30.5 (86.9)	30.6 (87.1)	30.8 (87.4)	31.2 (88.2)	31.4 (88.5)	31.1 (88.0)	30.3 (86.5)	29.4 (84.9)	30.1 (86.2)
Daily mean °C (°F)	25.2 (77.4)	25.1 (77.2)	25.4 (77.7)	26.1 (79.0)	26.9 (80.4)	27.4 (81.3)	27.5 (81.5)	27.6 (81.7)	27.4 (81.3)	27.2 (81.0)	26.6 (79.9)	25.8 (78.4)	26.5 (79.7)
Mean daily minimum °C (°F)	21.7 (71.1)	21.4 (70.5)	21.6 (70.9)	22.3 (72.1)	23.3 (73.9)	24.1 (75.4)	24.1 (75.4)	24.0 (75.2)	23.4 (74.1)	23.2 (73.8)	22.9 (73.2)	22.2 (72.0)	22.9 (73.2)
Record low °C (°F)	17.2 (63.0)	16.7 (62.1)	16.8 (62.2)	16.5 (61.7)	18.2 (64.8)	20.9 (69.6)	20.2 (68.4)	20.8 (69.4)	16.3 (61.3)	20.0 (68.0)	18.2 (64.8)	17.0 (62.6)	16.3 (61.3)
Average precipitation mm (inches)	158.2 (6.23)	94.9 (3.74)	111.4 (4.39)	192.9 (7.59)	199.6 (7.86)	195.0 (7.68)	238.5 (9.39)	279.5 (11.00)	269.1 (10.59)	313.2 (12.33)	363.0 (14.29)	220.7 (8.69)	2,636 (103.78)
Average precipitation days (≥ 1.0 mm)	20.8	15.6	14.8	15.8	16.1	18.4	21.5	22.3	20.0	21.8	22.0	20.2	229.3
Source: Météo-France

== Population ==
Historical population
Year	Pop.	±% p.a.
1967	4,562	—
1974	4,359	−0.65%
1982	4,201	−0.46%
1990	4,432	+0.67%
1999	4,183	−0.64%
2007	3,845	−1.05%
2012	3,609	−1.26%
2017	3,026	−3.46%
2023	2,852	−0.98%
Source: INSEE

== See also ==
- Communes of Martinique
