= 2007 Tocopilla earthquake =

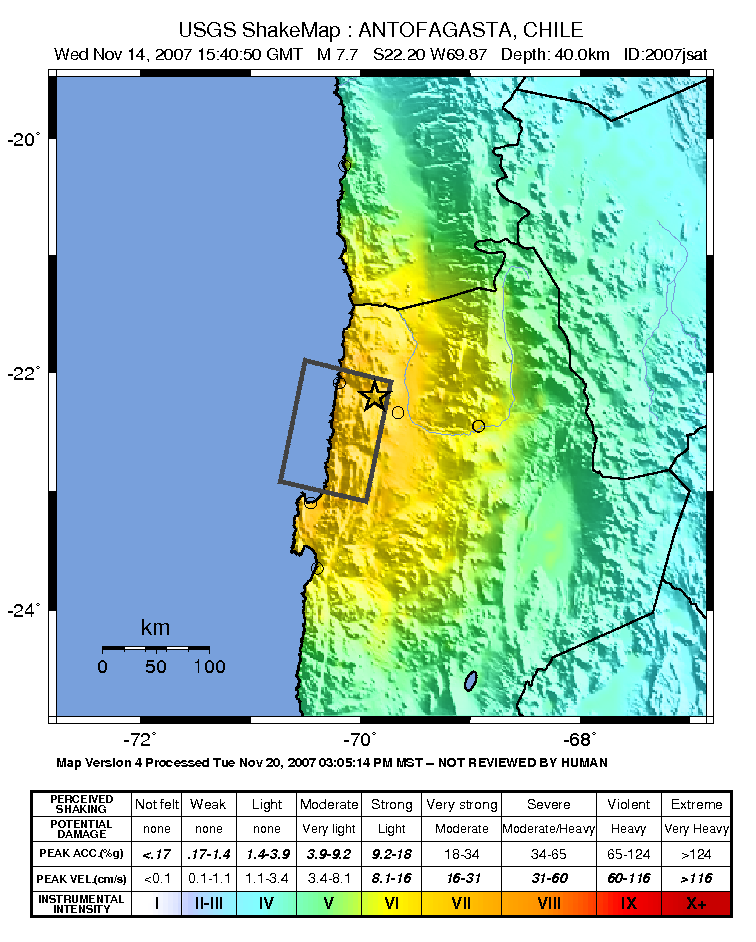

- Location within Chile Location within South America
- UTC time: 2007-11-14 15:40:50
- ISC event: 13266131
- USGS-ANSS: ComCat
- Local date: November 14, 2007
- Local time: 12:40
- Duration: 3:35
- Magnitude: 7.7 M_{w}
- Depth: 40 km (25 mi)
- Epicenter: 22.325°S 69.969°W
- Type: Thrust
- Areas affected: Chile
- Max. intensity: MMI VIII (Severe)
- Tsunami: 25.5 cm (10.0 in)
- Casualties: 2 killed 65 injured

The 2007 Tocopilla earthquake occurred on November 14 at 12:40:50 local time. Its epicenter was located between Quillagua and Tocopilla, affecting the Tarapacá and the Antofagasta regions in northern Chile. The earthquake had a moment magnitude of 7.7 and lasted about 3 minutes and 35 seconds. Seventeen aftershocks of magnitude greater than 5.3, including one of magnitude 7.1 and two others of magnitude 6.3 or higher, were recorded. The Pacific Tsunami Warning Center issued a tsunami warning, stating a tsunami had been generated; after one hour, this warning was cancelled. The earthquake was felt from Santiago, 1,245 km south from the epicenter, to La Paz, about 700 km north-northeast.

== Tectonic summary ==
The USGS reported that the earthquake resulted from the release of stresses generated by the subduction of the oceanic Nazca plate beneath the South American plate. In this region, known as the Peru-Chile subduction zone, the Nazca plate thrusts beneath South America at a rate of approximately 79 mm/year in an east-northeast direction. This earthquake indicates subduction-related thrusting, likely on the interface between these two plates.

This earthquake occurred near (and within) the southern end of the rupture area of the great magnitude 9.1 earthquake of 1877, which produced a destructive tsunami and whose source region has since the late 1970s been recognized as a potentially dangerous seismic gap. In 1995, a magnitude 8.0 earthquake occurred in the same subduction zone approximately 200 km further south of the November 14 event.

== Damage and casualties ==
At least two deaths have been attributed to this earthquake: an 88-year-old woman crushed under a collapsing wall at Tocopilla, and a 54-year-old woman whose exact cause of death remains unknown. There were also reports of widespread power outages in the region, including the cities of Antofagasta, Calama and Arica. The earthquake disrupted copper mining in the region; because Chile is the world's top supplier of copper, the earthquake caused prices of the metal to jump by more than six percent. Tin prices also rose four percent to reach a record high. There were reports of several dozen road workers trapped inside a collapsed highway tunnel. Two hundred homes were destroyed by the shaking and up to 15,000 people were displaced. In Tocopilla alone, 1,000 homes were demolished, representing 30 percent of all standing structures.

== See also ==
- List of earthquakes in 2007
- List of earthquakes in Chile
